= 2025 City of London Corporation election =

Local election in the City of London

- 20 March 2025

100 seats on Common Council 51 seats needed for a majority

	First party	Second party
Party	Independent	Temple & Farringdon Together
Last election	78 seats, 62.7%	10 seats, 5.3%
Seats before	77	10
Seats won	83	10
Seat change	▲5	Steady
	Third party	Fourth party
Party	Labour	Castle Baynard Independents
Last election	5 seats, 26.3%	7 seats, 4.4%
Seats before	6	7
Seats won	7	0
Seat change	▲2	▼7
Council control before election
No overall control
Council control after election
No overall control

The 2025 City of London Corporation election was held on 20 March 2025, prior to most other 2025 United Kingdom local elections, to elect Commoners to the Court of Common Council of the City of London Corporation.

The City of London is the oldest continuously-running municipal democracy in the world.

== Background ==
Elections to the Court of Common Council, the main decision-making body of the City of London Corporation which governs the City of London, take place every four years. At the last election in 2022 (delayed by a year due to the COVID-19 pandemic) 78 seats were won by Independents, 5 by Labour, and the remaining 17 by localist groups.

== Electoral system ==
Aldersgate, Cripplegate, Farringdon Without, Portsoken and Queenhithe are the more resident-populated of the twenty-five City Wards. Residents each have one vote, and businesses are allotted votes scaled in accordance with the number of employees. Businesses can appoint one employee as a voter for every five staff up to ten voters, with an additional voter per fifty staff beyond that.

Common Councillors (aka Commoners) are elected by block voting.

On the day before polling day, in this case the 19 March, wardmote meetings are held in which residents and workers are able to ask candidates questions.

== Common Council composition ==
Since the 2022 election, seven by-elections have been held to replace Commoners who resigned from, died in, or vacated office to become an Alderman of the City of London.

Two such by-elections were held in 2022, with Independents being elected for both Bridge and Bridge Without and Cordwainer.

Four were held in 2023: an independent was elected for Castle Baynard; two were held in Cripplegate, the first an independent hold after the sitting Commoner was elected an Alderman and the second, a Labour gain from Independent, following the resignation of Richard Bostock; and Temple & Farringdon Together returned a Commoner unopposed for Farringdon Without.

The only by-election in 2024 was held on the same day as the general election, when an independent was elected for Farringdon Within.

== Contesting groups and parties ==
=== Groups with prior representation ===
Below displays the current affiliation of Commoners on the City Common Council. Political party affiliations are shown. Some independents may align with slates of candidates for their ward. All parties are running candidates in the upcoming election.

Parties	Leader(s)	Ideology	Website	Seats		Candidates standing
Parties	Leader(s)	Ideology	Website	2022 election	Prior to the election	Candidates standing
Independent	N/A	N/A	N/A	78 / 100	77 / 100	104
Temple & Farringdon Together	Wendy Mead		www.templeandfarringdon.com	10 / 100	10 / 100	10
Castle Baynard Independents	John Griffiths		www.castle-baynard.org.uk	7 / 100	7 / 100	8
Labour Party		Social democracy	www.citylabour.org	5 / 100	6 / 100	13

=== Slates ===
Temple & Farringdon Together and Castle Baynard Independents are registered political parties, and hence are not included in this section.

The following groups are running a slate of candidates in a particular ward:

Slate	Leader(s)	Ward	Website	2022 Councillors	Candidates standing
		Bassishaw		1 / 2	2
#Better; Billingsgate		Billingsgate		1 / 6	2
David & Julie	David O'Reilly	Billingsgate	www.davidjulie4billingsgate.com	0 / 6	2
Bishopsgate Ward Team	Simon Duckworth	Bishopsgate	www.bishopsgate.london/team	4 / 6	6
Ward of Bread Street	Emily Benn	Bread Street	www.breadstreet.org	2 / 2	2
		Bridge		1 / 2	2
Iceni	Martha Grekos	Castle Baynard	www.castlebaynardiceni.org	0 / 8	8
Ward of Cheap Team	Robert Hughes-Penney	Cheap	www.wardofcheap.city	3 / 3	3
Coleman Street Ward	Dawn Wright	Coleman Street	www.colemanstreetward.org	1 / 4	4
Cordwainer Ward Team		Cordwainer		2 / 3	3
Team Dowgate	Henry Pollard	Dowgate	www.teamdowgate.org	2 / 2	2
Farringdon Within Ward candidates		Farringdon Within	www.farringdonwithin.com	1 / 8	2
Langbourn Team		Langbourn	www.langbourn.london	2 / 3	2
Team		Portsoken		3 / 4	4
Tower Ward Team		Tower	www.jamestumbridge.com	4 / 4	4
Vote Hodgson	Jaspreet Hodgson	Vintry	www.hodgson.city	1 / 2	2
Team Walbrook	James Thomson	Walbrook	www.jamesthomson.london	2 / 2	2

== Results summary ==
Prior to the election being held, 45 of the 100 councillors were elected uncontested across 14 wards, with some wards seeing candidates pull out.

2025 City of London Corporation election
Party	Seats					Votes		
Party	Count	Gains	Losses	Net	Of total (%)	Of total (%)	Count	Change
Independent	83	7	2	▲5	83.0			
Labour	7	2	0	▲2	7.0			
Temple & Farringdon Together	10	0	0	Steady	10.0			
Castle Baynard Independents	0	0	7	▼7	0.0			
Total	100							

== Results by ward ==
Asterisks denote incumbents. The results are compared to the 2022 elections.

=== Aldersgate ===
Aldersgate (6 seats)
Party	Candidate	Votes	%	±%
Labour	Helen Fentimen*	399		
Labour	Stephen Goodman*	375		
Labour	Sandra Jenner	369		
Independent	Deborah Oliver*	346		
Independent	Anett Rideg*	292		
Independent	Naresh Sonpar*	291		
Independent	Iain Meek	163		
Turnout			38%	
Labour hold				
Labour hold				
Labour gain from Independent				
Independent hold				
Independent hold				
Independent hold				

=== Aldgate ===
Aldgate (5 seats)
Party	Candidate	Votes	%	±%
Independent	Lesley Cole	–		
Independent	Timothy McNally*	–		
Independent	Andrien Meyers*	–		
Independent	David Sales*	–		
Independent	Mandeep Thandi*	–		
Turnout			N/A	
Independent gain from Independent				
Independent hold				
Independent hold				
Independent hold				
Independent hold				

=== Bassishaw ===
Bassishaw (2 seats)
Party	Candidate	Votes	%	±%
Independent	Madush Gupta*	167		
Independent	Cecile Boulton	126		
Independent	Randall Anderson	116		
Independent	Ian Bishop-Laggett*	40		
Independent	Ayub Azad	17		
Turnout			33%	
Independent hold				
Independent gain from Independent				

=== Billingsgate ===
Billingsgate (2 seats)
Party	Candidate	Votes	%	±%
Independent	Nighat Qureishi*	137		
Independent	Melissa Collett	115		
Independent	David O'Reilly	52		
Independent	Julie Tucker	51		
Independent	Luis Tilleria*	25		
No description	Jade Hagen	4		
Turnout			42%	
Independent hold				
Independent gain from Independent				

=== Bishopsgate ===
Bishopsgate (6 seats)
Party	Candidate	Votes	%	±%
Independent	Simon Burrows	–		
Independent	Karina Dostalova	–		
Independent	Simon Duckworth*	–		
Independent	Shravan Joshi*	–		
Independent	Benjamin Murphy*	–		
Independent	Tom Sleigh*	–		
Turnout			N/A	
Independent gain from Independent				
Independent gain from Independent				
Independent hold				
Independent hold				
Independent hold				
Independent hold				

=== Bread Street ===
Bread Street (2 seats)
Party	Candidate	Votes	%	±%
Independent	Emily Benn*	–		
Independent	Giles Shilson*	–		
Turnout			N/A	
Independent hold				
Independent hold				

=== Bridge ===
Bridge and Bridge Without (2 seats)
Party	Candidate	Votes	%	±%
Independent	Keith Bottomley*	–		
Independent	Hugh Selka*	–		
Turnout			N/A	
Independent hold				
Independent gain from Independent				

=== Broad Street ===
Broad Street (3 seats)
Party	Candidate	Votes	%	±%
Independent	Elizabeth Corrin	–		
Independent	Christopher Hayward*	–		
Independent	Antony Manchester*	–		
Turnout			N/A	
Independent gain from Independent				
Independent hold				
Independent hold				

=== Candlewick ===
Candlewick (2 seats)
Party	Candidate	Votes	%	±%
Independent	James St John Davis*	–		
Independent	Christopher Boden*	–		
Turnout			N/A	
Independent hold				
Independent hold				

=== Castle Baynard ===
Castle Baynard (8 seats)
Party	Candidate	Votes	%	±%
Independent	Bethany Coombs	292		
Independent	Tana Adkin	290		
Independent	Helen Ladele	289		
Independent	Susan Farrington	271		
Independent	Vasiliki Manta	271		
Independent	Leyla Ostovar	266		
Independent	Stephanie Steeden	257		
Independent	Josephine Hayes	255		
CB Independents	Graham Packham*	222		
CB Independents	George Godfrey	207		
CB Independents	Mary Durcan*	205		
CB Independents	John Griffiths*	203		
CB Independents	Debra Witt	199		
CB Independents	Henrika Priest*	198		
CB Independents	Paul Singh	196		
CB Independents	Michael Hudson*	185		
Independent	Alpa Raja*	91		
Independent	Ronnie Barker	80		
Independent	Chris MacNeil	32		
Turnout			31%	
Independent gain from Independent				
Independent gain from CB Independents				
Independent gain from CB Independents				
Independent gain from CB Independents				
Independent gain from CB Independents				
Independent gain from CB Independents				
Independent gain from CB Independents				
Independent gain from CB Independents				

=== Cheap ===
Cheap (3 seats)
Party	Candidate	Votes	%	±%
Independent	Nick Bensted-Smith*	–		
Independent	Tijs Broeke*	–		
Independent	Alastair Moss*	–		
Turnout			N/A	
Independent hold				
Independent hold				
Independent hold				

=== Coleman Street ===
Coleman Street (4 seats)
Party	Candidate	Votes	%	±%
Independent	Shahnan Bakth	–		
Independent	Philip Kelvin	–		
Independent	Sushil Saluja	–		
Independent	Dawn Wright*	–		
Turnout			N/A	
Independent gain from Independent				
Independent gain from Independent				
Independent gain from Independent				
Independent hold				

=== Cordwainer ===
Cordwainer (3 seats)
Party	Candidate	Votes	%	±%
Independent	Jamel Banda*	–		
Independent	Amy Horscroft*	–		
Independent	Michael Snyder*	–		
Turnout			N/A	
Independent hold				
Independent gain from Independent				
Independent hold				

=== Cornhill ===
Cornhill (3 seats)
Party	Candidate	Votes	%	±%
Independent	Joanna Abeyie*	–		
Independent	Peter Dunphy*	–		
Independent	Tessa Marchington	–		
Turnout			N/A	
Independent hold				
Independent hold				
Independent gain from Independent				

=== Cripplegate ===
Cripplegate (8 seats)
Party	Candidate	Votes	%	±%
Labour	Anne Corbett*	503		
Labour	Jacqui Webster*	502		
Labour	Mercy Haggerty	447		
Independent	Dawn Frampton*	443		
Labour	Sarah Gillinson	443		
Independent	Ceri Wilkins*	390		
Independent	Gaby Robertshaw	384		
Independent	Adam Hogg	368		
Independent	Christos Christou	277		
Independent	Ivo de Wit	168		
Turnout			35%	
Labour hold				
Labour hold				
Labour hold				
Independent gain from Independent				
Labour gain from Independent				
Independent hold				
Independent gain from Independent				
Independent gain from Independent				

=== Dowgate ===
Dowgate (2 seats)
Party	Candidate	Votes	%	±%
Independent	Henry Pollard*	–		
Independent	Mark Wheatley*	–		
Turnout			N/A	
Independent hold				
Independent hold				

=== Farringdon Within ===
Farringdon Within (8 seats)
Party	Candidate	Votes	%	±%
Independent	John Edwards*	259		
Independent	Ann Holmes*	242		
Independent	Brendan Barns*	232		
Independent	John Foley*	206		
Independent	Matthew Bell*	201		
Independent	David Williams*	201		
Independent	Florence Keelson-Anfu*	146		
Independent	Fraser Peck	133		
Independent	Jani Levanen	123		
Independent	Nzube Ufodike	88		
Labour	Gordon Nardell	80		
Labour	Bilal Mahmood	79		
Independent	Gerard O'Sullivan	76		
Turnout			32%	
Independent hold				
Independent hold				
Independent hold				
Independent hold				
Independent hold				
Independent gain from Independent				
Independent hold				
Independent gain from Independent				

=== Farringdon Without ===
Farringdon Without (10 seats)
Party	Candidate	Votes	%	±%
T&F Together	Paul Martinelli*	260		
T&F Together	Greg Lawrence*	253		
T&F Together	Wendy Mead*	253		
T&F Together	George Abrahams*	249		
T&F Together	Oliver Sells*	232		
T&F Together	William Upton*	229		
T&F Together	Edward Lord*	227		
T&F Together	Suzanne Ornsby*	222		
T&F Together	Ruby Sayed*	222		
T&F Together	Stuart Thompson	212		
Independent	Desiree Artesi	145		
Turnout			11%	
T&F Together hold				
T&F Together hold				
T&F Together hold				
T&F Together hold				
T&F Together hold				
T&F Together hold				
T&F Together hold				
T&F Together hold				
T&F Together hold				
T&F Together hold				

=== Langbourn ===
Langbourn (3 seats)
Party	Candidate	Votes	%	±%
Independent	Timothy Butcher*	135		
Independent	Matthew Waters	102		
Independent	Philip Woodhouse*	90		
Independent	Judith Pleasance*	84		
Independent	Amy Green	68		
Turnout			41%	
Independent hold				
Independent gain from Independent				
Independent hold				

=== Lime Street ===
Lime Street (4 seats)
Party	Candidate	Votes	%	±%
Independent	Dominic Christian*	–		
Independent	Henry Colthurst*	–		
Independent	Anthony Fitzpatrick*	–		
Independent	Irem Yerdelen*	–		
Turnout			N/A	
Independent hold				
Independent hold				
Independent hold				
Independent hold				

=== Portsoken ===
Portsoken (4 seats)
Party	Candidate	Votes	%	±%
Independent	John Fletcher*	219		
Independent	Samapti Bagchi	207		
Independent	Jason Paul Pritchard*	183		
Independent	Munsur Ali*	171		
Independent	Alina Koztepe	115		
Independent	Hanif Ali	113		
Labour	Joe Verlander	52		
Labour	Dil-Veer Kang	36		
Turnout			49%	
Independent hold				
Independent gain from Independent				
Independent hold				
Independent hold				

=== Queenhithe ===
Queenhithe (2 seats)
Party	Candidate	Votes	%	±%
Independent	Caroline Haines*	–		
Independent	Sophia Mooney	–		
Turnout			N/A	
Independent hold				
Independent hold				

=== Tower ===
Tower (4 seats)
Party	Candidate	Votes	%	±%
Independent	Aaron D'Souza*	–		
Independent	Marianne Fredericks*	–		
Independent	Jason Groves*	–		
Independent	James Tumbridge*	–		
Turnout			N/A	
Independent hold				
Independent hold				
Independent hold				
Independent hold				

=== Vintry ===
Vintry (2 seats)
Party	Candidate	Votes	%	±%
Independent	Jaspreet Hodgson*	131		
Independent	Stephen Hodgson	111		
Labour	Jonathan McLeod	30		
Labour	Mark Glover	26		
Turnout			49%	
Independent hold				
Independent gain from Independent				

=== Walbrook ===
Walbrook (2 seats)
Party	Candidate	Votes	%	±%
Independent	Alethea Silk*	150		
Independent	James Thomson*	145		
Independent	Gillian Kaile	41		
Turnout			39%	
Independent hold				
Independent hold				

== By-elections ==
Coleman Street by-election: 4 June 2026
Party	Candidate	Votes	%	±%
Independent	John Griffiths	59	33.9	
Independent	Ronnie Barker	44	25.3	
Independent	Randall Anderson	21	12.1	
Independent	Suyi Opebiyi	17	9.8	
Independent	Alpa Raja	15	8.6	
No description	Richard Fenner	8	4.6	
Independent	Philip Baldwin	7	4.0	
Independent	Andrew Tyler	3	1.7	
Turnout		174	27.6	
Independent hold		Swing		

The by-election was triggered by the election of Sushil Saluja as Alderman of the City of London for Coleman Street on 4 February 2026.

== See also ==
- Chief Commoner
- City of London
