= 2022 City of London Corporation election =

2022 local election in the City of London

- 24 March 2022

100 seats to the Court of Common Council 51 seats needed for a majority
- Turnout: 32.4%

	First party	Second party
Party	Independent	Temple & Farringdon Together
Last election	85 seats, 72.5%	10 seats, 10.5%
Seats won	78	10
Seat change	▼7	Steady
Popular vote	3,392	289
Percentage	62.7%	5.3%
Swing	▼9.8%	▼5.2%
	Third party	Fourth party
Party	Castle Baynard Independents	Labour
Last election	Did not stand	5 seats, 17.1%
Seats won	7	5
Seat change	▲7	Steady
Popular vote	237	1,425
Percentage	4.4%	26.3%
Swing	New party	▲9.2%
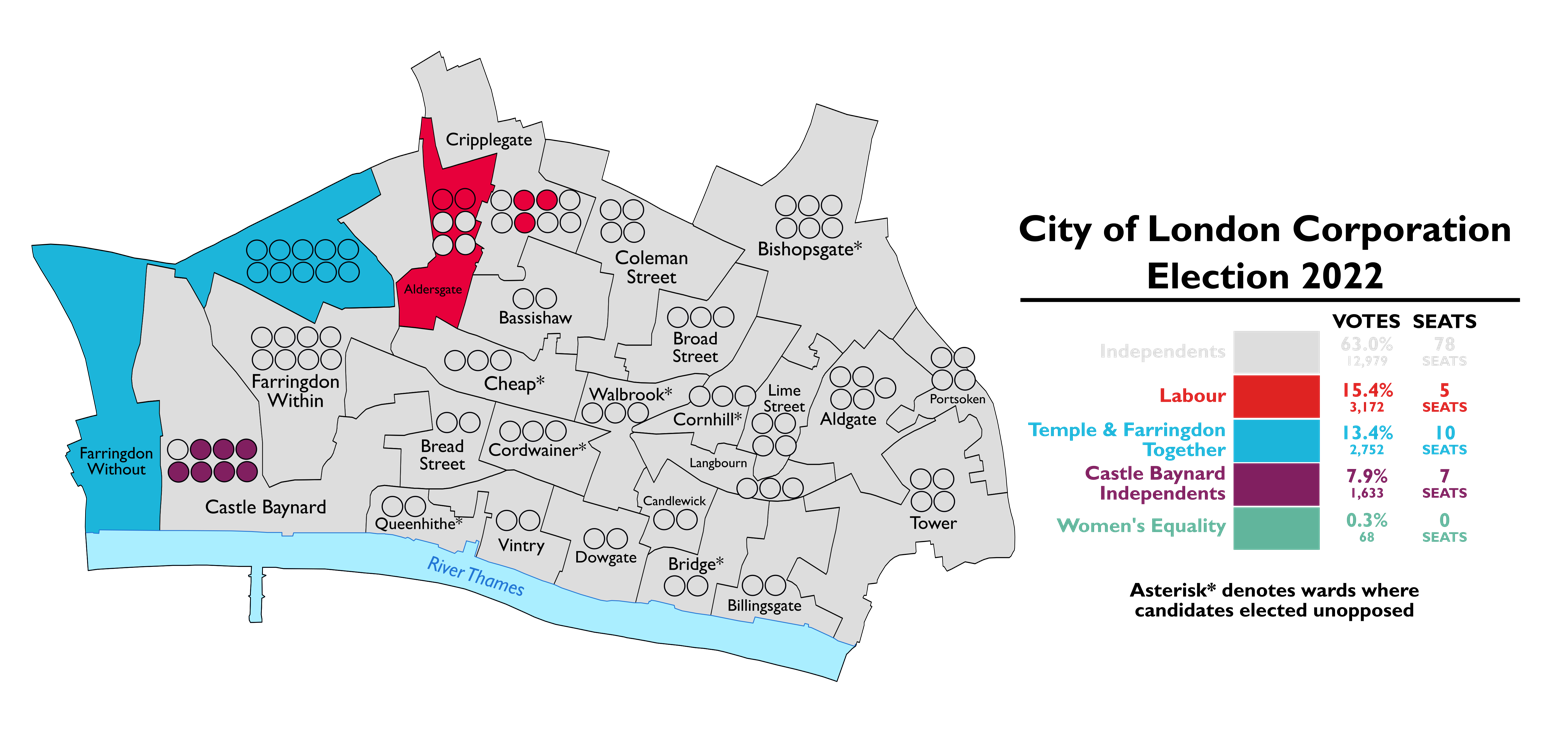
- Map of results.
Council control before election
No overall control
Council control after election
No overall control

The 2022 City of London Corporation election took place on 24 March 2022 to elect members of the Court of Common Council in the City of London Corporation, England. The election was postponed for a year due to the COVID-19 pandemic.

== Background ==
Elections to the Court of Common Council, the main decision-making body of the City of London Corporation which governs the City of London, take place every four years. In the previous election in 2017, 85 seats were won by independent candidates, 10 by Temple and Farringdon Together and the remaining five by the Labour Party.

The election was originally scheduled for 18 March 2021, but was delayed for a year due to the COVID-19 pandemic.

It had been proposed that, due to the pandemic, the elections be combined with the 2021 United Kingdom local elections in the rest of England on 6 May. The City's Policy and Resources Committee recommended against this, and suggested July 2021 as an alternative date should the elections need to be postponed.

== Electoral system ==
Most residents of the twenty-five wards of the City of London live in the Aldersgate, Cripplegate, Portsoken and Queenhithe. Residents have one vote each, and businesses have a number of votes that scales with the number of employees. Businesses can appoint one employee as a voter for every five staff up to ten voters, with an additional voter per fifty staff beyond that.

Councillors are elected by multi-member first-past-the-post.

== Campaign ==
The Russian state-owned VTB Bank, which had been sanctioned by the UK government over the 2022 Russian invasion of Ukraine, nonetheless received a share of votes.

== Overall results ==
The election resulted in Temple and Farringdon Together and the Labour Party winning the same number of seats as they had done in the previous election, with Temple and Farringdon Together on ten seats and Labour on five. The new Castle Baynard Independents won seven seats, with the remaining seats being won by independent candidates. The Women's Equality Party stood candidates but none were successful. One of the victorious independent candidates was Emily Benn, whose grandfather was the Labour MP Tony Benn.

Six wards were uncontested. Turnout in the elections averaged 34.2% across contested wards.

2022 City of London Corporation election
Party	Seats					Votes		
Party	Count	Gains	Losses	Net	Of total (%)	Of total (%)	Count	Change
Independent	78	2	9	▼7	78.0	62.7	3,392	▼9.8
Labour	5	2	2	Steady	5.0	26.3	1,425	▲9.2
Temple & Farringdon Together	10	0	0	Steady	10.0	5.3	289	▼5.2
Castle Baynard Independents	7	7	0	▲7	7.0	4.4	237	▲4.4
Women's Equality	0	0	0	Steady	0.0	1.3	68	▲1.3
Total	100							

== Ward results ==
Statements of persons nominated were published on 1 March. Incumbent councillors are marked with an asterisk (*).

=== Aldersgate ===
Aldersgate (6 seats)
Party	Candidate	Votes	%	±%
Labour	Helen Fentiman*	499	18.4	N/A
Labour	Stephen Goodman	443	16.4	N/A
Independent	Annet Rideg	373	13.8	N/A
Independent	Naresh Sonpar	351	13.0	N/A
Independent	Deborah Oliver	350	12.9	N/A
Independent	Randall Anderson*	317	11.7	N/A
Independent	Jeremy Mayhew*	260	9.6	N/A
Independent	Adam Richardson	113	4.2	N/A
Turnout		2,706		N/A
Labour hold				
Labour gain from Independent				
Independent hold				
Independent hold				
Independent hold				
Independent hold				

=== Aldgate ===
Andrien Meyers, Tim McNally, David Sales, Mandeep Thandi and Shailendra Umradia stood together under the name "Aldgate Team".

Aldgate (5 seats)
Party	Candidate	Votes	%	±%
Independent	Andrien Meyers*	203	17.9	N/A
Independent	Timothy McNally	195	17.2	N/A
Independent	David Sales	194	17.1	N/A
Independent	Mandeep Thandi	192	17.0	N/A
Independent	Shailendra Umradia	178	15.7	N/A
Independent	Camilia Kaerts	88	7.8	N/A
Independent	Hugh Morris*	82	7.2	N/A
Turnout		1,132		N/A
Independent hold				
Independent gain from Independent				
Independent gain from Independent				
Independent gain from Independent				
Independent gain from Independent				

=== Bassishaw ===
Bassishaw (2 seats)
Party	Candidate	Votes	%	±%
Independent	Madush Gupta	133	43.3	
Independent	Ian Bishop-Laggett	114	37.1	N/A
Independent	Rajiv Vyas	60	19.5	N/A
Turnout		307		N/A
Independent gain from Independent				
Independent gain from Independent				

=== Billingsgate ===
Nighat Qureishi and Luis Tilleria stood together under the slogan "Build a Better Billingsgate".

Billingsgate (2 seats)
Party	Candidate	Votes	%	±%
Independent	Luis Tilleria	77	28.2	N/A
Independent	Nighat Qureishi	75	27.5	N/A
Independent	John Allen-Petrie*	62	22.7	N/A
Independent	Jamie Ingham Clark*	59	21.6	▼19.6
Turnout		273		–
Independent gain from Independent				
Independent gain from Independent				

=== Bishopsgate ===
Bishopsgate (6 seats)
Party	Candidate	Votes	%	±%
Independent	Simon Duckworth*	–	–	–
Independent	Wendy Hyde*	–	–	–
Independent	Shavran Joshi	–	–	–
Independent	Andrew Mayer*	–	–	–
Independent	Benjamin Murphy	–	–	–
Independent	Tom Sleigh*	–	–	–
Turnout		–	–	–
Independent hold				
Independent hold				
Independent gain from Independent				
Independent hold				
Independent gain from Independent				
Independent hold				

=== Bread Street ===
Emily Benn stood jointly with Giles Shilson.

Bread Street (2 seats)
Party	Candidate	Votes	%	±%
Independent	Emily Benn	105	37.5	N/A
Independent	Giles Shilson*	84	30.0	▼10.1
Independent	Stephen Hodgson	60	21.4	N/A
Women's Equality	Harini Iyengar	31	11.1	N/A
Turnout		280		—
Independent gain from Independent				
Independent hold				

=== Bridge ===
Bridge and Bridge Without (2 seats)
Party	Candidate	Votes	%	±%
Independent	Keith Bottomley*	—	–	—
Independent	Timothy Levene*	—	—	—
Turnout		–	–	–
Independent hold				
Independent hold				

=== Broad Street ===
Shahnan Bakth, Christopher Hayward and Antony Manchester stood jointly.

Broad Street (3 seats)
Party	Candidate	Votes	%	±%
Independent	Christopher Hayward*	148	29.4	N/A
Independent	Shahnan Bakth	127	25.2	N/A
Independent	Antony Manchester	113	22.4	N/A
Independent	Elizabeth Corrin	65	12.9	N/A
Independent	John Scott*	51	10.1	N/A
Turnout		504		N/A
Independent hold				
Independent gain from Independent				
Independent gain from Independent				

=== Candlewick ===
The incumbent councillors James de Sausmarez and Kevin Everett stood jointly; the other candidates, Christopher Boden and James Bromiley-Davis likewise stood as a pair.

Candlewick (2 seats)
Party	Candidate	Votes	%	±%
Independent	James Bromiley-Davis	75	29.2	N/A
Independent	Christopher Boden	67	26.1	N/A
Independent	James de Sausmarez*	58	22.6	▼26.1
Independent	Kevin Everett*	57	22.2	▼22.6
Turnout		257		N/A
Independent gain from Independent				
Independent gain from Independent				

=== Castle Baynard ===
Candidates for the Castle Baynard Independents Party are marked CB Independents. Change in vote share for CB Independents candidates reflect their previous vote share when running as independents.

Castle Baynard (8 seats)
Party	Candidate	Votes	%	±%
Independent	Martha Grekos	271	14.2	N/A
CB Independents	Henrika Priest*	237	12.4	▲1.1
CB Independents	Joan Mary Durcan	224	11.8	N/A
CB Independents	Alpa Raja	218	11.4	▲5.4
CB Independents	Graham Packham*	215	11.3	▲0.6
CB Independents	Catherine McGuinness*	211	11.1	▲0.4
CB Independents	John Griffiths	206	10.8	N/A
CB Independents	Glen Witney	205	10.8	N/A
CB Independents	Michael Hudson*	117	6.1	▼3.7
Turnout		1,904		N/A
Independent gain from Independent		Swing	–	
CB Independents gain from Independent		Swing	–	
CB Independents gain from Independent		Swing	–	
CB Independents gain from Independent		Swing	–	
CB Independents gain from Independent		Swing	–	
CB Independents gain from Independent		Swing	–	
CB Independents gain from Independent		Swing	–	
CB Independents gain from Independent		Swing	–	

=== Cheap ===
Cheap (3 seats)
Party	Candidate	Votes	%	±%
Independent	Nick Bensted-Smith*	—	–	—
Independent	Tijs Broeke*	—	—	—
Independent	Alastair Moss*	—	—	—
Turnout		–	–	–
Independent hold				
Independent hold				
Independent hold				

=== Coleman Street ===
Coleman Street (4 seats)
Party	Candidate	Votes	%	±%
Independent	Sophie Fernandes*	142	25.3	▼0.7
Independent	Dawn Wright*	125	22.3	N/A
Independent	Andrew McMurtrie*	113	20.1	▼1.9
Independent	Michael Cassidy*	98	17.5	▼3.8
Independent	Saif Masood	83	14.8	N/A
Turnout		561		—
Independent hold				
Independent hold				

=== Cordwainer ===
The three candidates, elected unopposed, stood jointly.

Cordwainer (3 seats)
Party	Candidate	Votes	%	±%
Independent	Jamel Banda	—	–	—
Independent	Alex Barr*	—	—	—
Independent	Michael Snyder*	—	—	—
Turnout		–	–	–
Independent gain from Independent				
Independent hold				
Independent hold				

=== Cornhill ===
Cornhill (3 seats)
Party	Candidate	Votes	%	±%
Independent	Joanna Abeyie	—	–	—
Independent	Peter Dunphy*	—	—	—
Independent	Ian Seaton*	—	—	—
Turnout		–	–	–
Independent gain from Independent				
Independent hold				
Independent hold				

=== Cripplegate ===
Simon Walsh and Ceri Wilkins stood together jointly.

Cripplegate (8 seats)
Party	Candidate	Votes	%	±%
Independent	Susan Pearson*	686	14.1	▲0.5
Labour	Natasha Lloyd-Owen	617	12.6	▲2.6
Labour	Anne Corbett	616	12.6	▲2.8
Independent	Mark Bostock*	587	12.0	▲4.1
Independent	Elizabeth King	581	11.9	N/A
Labour	Frances Leach	549	11.2	N/A
Independent	Paul Singh	393	8.1	N/A
Independent	Ceri Wilkins	378	7.7	N/A
Independent	Shazaah Masood	252	5.2	N/A
Independent	Simon Walsh	222	4.5	N/A
Turnout		4,881		—
Independent hold				
Labour hold				
Labour hold				
Independent hold				
Independent gain from Independent				
Labour gain from Independent				
Independent gain from Independent				
Independent gain from Independent				

=== Dowgate ===
The incumbent councillors Henry Pollard and Mark Wheatley stood jointly.

Dowgate (2 seats)
Party	Candidate	Votes	%	±%
Independent	Deputy Henry Pollard*	83	38.8	▼1.8
Independent	Mark Wheatley*	79	36.9	▼0.1
No description	Flora Hamilton	52	24.3	N/A
Turnout		214		—
Independent hold				
Independent hold				

=== Farringdon Within ===
Farringdon Within (8 seats)
Party	Candidate	Votes	%	±%
Independent	John Edwards*	245	13.8	▲7.9
Independent	Ann Holmes*	240	13.5	▲4.1
Independent	Brendan Barns	204	11.5	N/A
Independent	Matthew Bell*	159	8.9	▲1.0
Independent	John Foley	153	8.6	N/A
Independent	Eamonn Mullally	148	8.3	N/A
Independent	Florence Keelson-Anfu	106	6.0	N/A
Independent	Graeme Doshi-Smith*	100	5.6	▼1.0
Labour	Harry Stratton	87	4.9	N/A
No description	Arne Mielken	84	4.7	N/A
Labour	Gordon Nardell	83	4.7	N/A
Independent	Gillian Kaile	60	3.4	N/A
Independent	John Gill	45	2.5	N/A
Independent	Joseph Cawley	34	1.9	N/A
Independent	Gerard O'Sullivan	29	1.6	N/A
Turnout		1,777		—
Independent hold				
Independent hold				
Independent gain from Independent				
Independent hold				
Independent gain from Independent				
Independent gain from Independent				
Independent gain from Independent				
Independent hold				

=== Farringdon Without ===
The ten incumbents stood for the Temple and Farringdon Together party, the label they had been elected as in the 2017 election.

Farringdon Without (10 seats)
Party	Candidate	Votes	%	±%
T&F Together	Wendy Mead*	289	10.1	▲2.9
T&F Together	Greg Lawrence*	286	10.0	▲3.1
T&F Together	Oliver Sells*	283	9.9	▲3.3
T&F Together	Ruby Sayed*	282	9.9	▲2.7
T&F Together	Paul Martinelli*	281	9.8	▲2.9
T&F Together	Edward Lord*	278	9.7	▲2.9
T&F Together	Caroline Kordai Addy*	275	9.6	▲2.2
T&F Together	William Upton*	267	9.3	N/A
T&F Together	George Abrahams*	262	9.2	▲2.4
T&F Together	John Absalom*	249	8.7	▲2.0
Labour	Ellen Goodwin	108	3.8	N/A
Turnout		2,860		—
T&F Together hold		Swing	–	
T&F Together hold		Swing	–	
T&F Together hold		Swing	–	
T&F Together hold		Swing	–	
T&F Together hold		Swing	–	
T&F Together hold		Swing	–	
T&F Together hold		Swing	–	
T&F Together hold		Swing	–	
T&F Together hold		Swing	–	
T&F Together hold		Swing	–	

=== Langbourn ===
Alexander Craggs, Judith Pleasance and Philip Woodhouse stood together jointly.

Langbourn (3 seats)
Party	Candidate	Votes	%	±%
Independent	Judith Pleasance*	55	22.3	▼1.0
Independent	Timothy Butcher	50	20.2	▲4.0
Independent	Philip Woodhouse*	49	19.8	▼7.2
Independent	Alexander Craggs	36	14.6	▼0.7
Independent	John Chapman*	34	13.8	▼4.4
Independent	Timothy Wright	23	9.3	N/A
Turnout		247		—
Independent hold				
Independent gain from Independent				
Independent hold				

=== Lime Street ===
Lime Street (4 seats)
Party	Candidate	Votes	%	±%
Independent	Dominic Christian*	134	27.7	▼0.6
Independent	Irem Yerdelen	108	22.3	
Independent	Henry Colthurst*	106	21.9	▲0.8
Independent	Anthony Fitzpatrick	95	19.6	N/A
Independent	Sam Batstone	41	8.5	N/A
Turnout		484		—
Independent hold				
Independent gain from Independent				
Independent hold				
Independent gain from Independent				

=== Portsoken ===
The election that took place in Portsoken Ward recorded the highest turnout in the entire 2022 Common Council Elections with 57.6% of the electorate casting their vote. The average turnout across the City of London was 36.5%. Two incumbent councillors, Munsur Ali and Jason Paul Pritchard, who were elected as Labour candidates in 2017, stood jointly. John Fletcher and Henry Jones stood jointly. Changes in voteshare are by party for the Labour candidates and by candidate for independent candidates who previously stood as independents.

Portsoken (4 seats)
Party	Candidate	Votes	%	±%
Independent	John Fletcher*	255	21.8	▲4.6
No description	Munsur Ali*	254	21.7	N/A
No description	Jason Paul Pritchard*	239	20.5	N/A
Independent	Henry Jones*	213	18.2	▲1.9
Labour	Lana Joyce	114	9.8	▼10.2
Labour	Dominic Hauschild	56	4.8	▼14.1
Women's Equality	Alison Smith	37	3.2	N/A
Turnout		1,168	57.6	▲6.9
Independent hold				
No description gain from Labour		Swing	–	
No description gain from Labour		Swing	–	
Independent hold				

=== Queenhithe ===
Queenhithe (2 seats)
Party	Candidate	Votes	%	±%
Independent	Caroline Haines*	—	–	—
Independent	Brian Mooney*	—	—	—
Turnout		–	–	–
Independent hold				
Independent hold				

=== Tower ===
Roger Chadwick, Marianne Fredericks, James Tumbridge and Jason Groves stood jointly as the "Tower Ward Team".

Tower (4 seats)
Party	Candidate	Votes	%	±%
Independent	Marianne Fredericks*	219	24.2	N/A
Independent	James Tumbridge*	184	20.4	N/A
Independent	Aaron D'Souza	183	20.2	N/A
Independent	Jason Groves	176	19.5	N/A
Independent	Roger Chadwick*	142	15.7	N/A
Turnout		904		N/A
Independent hold				
Independent hold				
Independent gain from Independent				
Independent gain from Independent				

=== Vintry ===
Rehana Ameer and Richard Burge stood jointly.

Vintry (2 seats)
Party	Candidate	Votes	%	±%
Independent	Rehana Ameer*	62	42.8	▲9.8
Independent	Jaspreet Hodgson	45	31.0	N/A
Independent	Richard Burge	38	26.2	N/A
Turnout		145		—
Independent hold				
Independent gain from Independent				

=== Walbrook ===
The incumbent councillors, Peter Bennett and James Thomson, stood jointly.

Walbrook (2 seats)
Party	Candidate	Votes	%	±%
Independent	James Thomson*	126	—	—
Independent	Alethea Silk	113	—	—
Independent	Peter Bennett*	105	–	—
Turnout		–	–	–
Independent hold				
Independent gain from Independent				

== By-elections ==
Only elections for vacancies among the Common Councilmen are listed here. Elections for aldermen, who are elected separately, are not included.

=== Cordwainer ===
Cordwainer by-election, 15 September 2022
Party	Candidate	Votes	%	±%
Independent	Amy Alice Horscroft	54	73.0	N/A
Independent	Karina Dostalova	15	20.3	N/A
Independent	Angelika Sybille Wagner	5	6.8	N/A
Majority		39	52.7	N/A
Turnout		74	26.0	N/A
Independent hold				

The by-election followed the election of Common Councilman Alex Barr as the ward's alderman.

=== Bridge and Bridge Without ===
Bridge and Bridge Without by-election, 3 November 2022
Party	Candidate	Votes	%	±%
Independent	Hugh Maximilian Hilliard Selka	75	45.2	N/A
Independent	Melissa Rachel Collett	63	38.0	N/A
Independent	Saif Ahamed Masood	16	9.6	N/A
Labour	Gordon Lawrence Nardell	9	5.4	N/A
Independent	Scott Marcus Longman	3	1.8	N/A
Majority		12	7.2	N/A
Turnout		166	36.2	N/A
Independent hold				

The by-election followed the election of Common Councilman Tim Levene as the ward's alderman.

=== Castle Baynard ===
Castle Baynard by-election, 23 March 2023
Party	Candidate	Votes	%	±%
Independent	Michael Hudson	93	48.2	N/A
Independent	Edward David John Goodchild	47	24.4	N/A
Independent	Scott Marcus Longman	32	16.6	N/A
Independent	Kevin Malcolm Everett	21	10.9	N/A
Majority		46	23.8	N/A
Turnout		193	11.9	N/A
Independent hold				

The by-election followed the resignation of Common Councilwoman Martha Grekos.

=== Cripplegate ===
Cripplegate by-election, 23 March 2023
Party	Candidate	Votes	%	±%
Independent	Dawn Margaret Frampton	369	58.7	N/A
Independent	Lionel Meyringer	214	34.0	N/A
Independent	Angus Spencer Athol Mylne	46	7.3	N/A
Majority		155	24.6	N/A
Turnout		629	29.2	N/A
Independent hold				

The by-election followed the election of Common Councilwoman Susan Pearson as the ward's alderwoman.

Cripplegate by-election, 2 November 2023
Party	Candidate	Votes	%	±%
Labour	Jacqui Webster	279	40.8	N/A
Independent	Adam Michael Hogg	182	26.6	N/A
Independent	Jan-Marc Petroschka	177	25.9	N/A
Independent	Arne Mielken	46	6.7	N/A
Majority		97	14.2	N/A
Turnout		684	31.0	N/A
Labour gain from Independent				

The by-election followed the resignation of Common Councilman Mark Bostock on grounds of ill health. He died later that month.

=== Farringdon Without ===
Farringdon Without by-election, 29 November 2023
Party	Candidate	Votes	%	±%
Temple and Farringdon Together	Suzanne Ornsby	Unopposed		N/A
Turnout				N/A
Temple and Farringdon Together hold				

The by-election followed the resignation of Common Councilwoman Caroline Addy. Ornsby was the only candidate and was declared elected unopposed at the wardmote on 29 November, so the poll scheduled for 30 November did not take place.

=== Farringdon Within ===
Farringdon Within by-election, 4 July 2024
Party	Candidate	Votes	%	±%
Independent	David John Williams	109	37.8	N/A
Independent	Edward David John Goodchild	102	35.4	N/A
Independent	Jani Tapio Levanen	47	16.3	N/A
Independent	Gerard Killian O'Sullivan	30	10.4	N/A
Majority		7	2.4	N/A
Turnout		288	23.7	N/A
Independent hold				

The by-election followed the resignation of Common Councilman Graeme Doshi-Smith.
