= List of works by Christopher Wren =

Sir Christopher Wren was one of the most highly acclaimed English architects in history, as well as an anatomist, astronomer, geometer, and mathematician-physicist. He was accorded responsibility for rebuilding 52 churches in the City of London after the Great Fire in 1666, including what is regarded as his masterpiece, St Paul's Cathedral, on Ludgate Hill, completed in 1710.

According to Kerry Downes, "there is considerable evidence that Wren," by the end of the 17th century, "delegated particular projects to [Nicholas] Hawksmoor." The nature and extent of Wren's involvement in the designs his office produced towards the end of his career is debated by scholars.

== Built works ==
=== Extant works ===
Image	Name	Location	Date	Listing	Comment	Coordinates
	Pembroke College Chapel	Pembroke College, Cambridge	1663–65	Grade I (1950) 1125509	Chancel arch and extra bay added by George Gilbert Scott in 1880	52°12′06″N 0°07′07″E
	Sheldonian Theatre	University of Oxford, Oxford	1664–69	Grade I (1954) 1047350		51°45′16″N 1°15′18″W
	Emmanuel College Chapel	Emmanuel College, Cambridge	1666	Grade I (1950) 1332193		52°12′14″N 0°07′28″E
	North Building, Garden Quadrangle	Trinity College, Oxford	1665–1668	Grade I (1954) 1046624	Attributed to Wren, an additional floor was later added	51°45′21″N 1°15′27″W
	Temple Bar Gate	Fleet Street, St James's, City of Westminster (Note: Removed 1878; now in Paternoster Square, City of London: 51°30′51″N 0°05′58″W)	1669	Grade I (2010) 1393844		51°30′49″N 0°06′43″W
	St Michael, Cornhill	Cornhill, Cornhill, City of London	1669–72	Grade I (1950) 1286688	Survived in original form; portions of the tower designed by Hawksmoor	51°30′47.50″N 0°5′7.68″W
	Alterations to Longleat	Wiltshire	1670	Grade I (1968) 1364361		51°11′11″N 2°16′31″W
	St Mary-at-Hill	Lovat Lane, Billingsgate, City of London	1670–76	Grade I (1950) 1064600	Substantially altered in 1787–88 and 1826–27	51.510069°N 0.08374°W
	St Edmund, King and Martyr	Lombard Street, Langbourn, City of London	1670–79	Grade I (1950) 1064631	Survived in original form	51°30′44.62″N 0°5′10.68″W
	St Mary-le-Bow	Cheapside, Cordwainer, City of London	1670–83	Grade I (1950) 1064696	Substantially rebuilt after the Blitz	51°30′50″N 0°05′37″W
	St Bride's Church	Fleet Street, Castle Baynard, City of London	1670–84	Grade I (1950) 1064657	Substantially rebuilt after the Blitz	51°30′50″N 0°6′21″W
	St Lawrence Jewry	Gresham Street, Cheap, City of London	1670–86	Grade I (1950) 1064673	Substantially rebuilt after the Blitz	51.5152°N 0.0925°W
	St Vedast Foster Lane	Foster Lane, Cheap, City of London	1670–97	Grade I (1950) 1064666	Substantially rebuilt after the Blitz	51°30′53.56″N 0°5′46.08″W
	The Monument	Bridge, City of London	1671–77	Grade I (1950) 1193901		51°30′53.56″N 0°5′46.08″W
	St Nicholas Cole Abbey	Queen Victoria Street, Bread Street Ward, City of London	1671–81	Grade I (1950) 1079146	Substantially rebuilt after the Blitz	51°30′43″N 0°5′48″W
	St Magnus-the-Martyr	Lower Thames Street, Bridge, City of London	1671–87	Grade I (1950) 1064601	Altered after London Bridge was widened in 1762	51°30′33.41″N 0°5′10.81″W
	St Stephen Walbrook	Walbrook, Walbrook, City of London	1672–79	Grade I (1950) 1285320	Survived in original form	51°30′45.46″N 0°5′23.71″W
	Wren Library	Lincoln Cathedral, Lincoln	1674–76	Grade I (1953) 1388680		53°14′05″N 0°32′09″W
	Pedestal, Statue of Charles I	Charing Cross, City of Westminster	1675–76	Grade I (1970) 1357291	Plinth ultimately executed by sculptor Joshua Marshall.	
	Flamsteed House, Royal Observatory, Greenwich	Greenwich, Royal Borough of Greenwich	1675–76	Grade I (1973) 1358976		51°28′41″N 0°00′07″W
	St Paul's Cathedral	St Paul's Churchyard, Castle Baynard, City of London	1675–1711	Grade I (1950) 1079157	Survived in original form	51°30′49″N 0°05′53″W
	St James Garlickhythe	Garlick Hill, Vintry, City of London	1676–83	Grade I (1950) 1064669	Spire by Hawksmoor; survived in original form	51°30′39.99″N 0°5′37.54″W
	St James's Church, Piccadilly	Piccadilly, St James's, City of Westminster	1676–84	Grade I (1958) 1226621	Destroyed in 1940; restored in 1947–54 after the Blitz	51°30′31″N 0°8′12″W
Wren Library, Trinity College (cropped)	Wren Library	Nevile's Court, Trinity College, Cambridge	1676–95	Grade I (1950) 1106371		52°12′26″N 0°06′54″E
	King's Bench Walk	Temple, London	1677–78	Grade I (1950) 1193156		51°30′47″N 0°06′33″W
	St Benet's, Paul's Wharf	Queen Victoria Street, Queenhithe, City of London	1677–83	Grade I (1950) 1180700	Survived in original form	51°30′42.01″N 0°5′57.38″W
	St Martin, Ludgate	Ludgate Hill, Farringdon Within, City of London	1677–84	Grade I (1950) 1359194	Survived in original form	51°30′50.55″N 0°6′6.99″W
	St Peter upon Cornhill	Cornhill, Cornhill, City of London	1677–84	Grade I (1950) 1192245	Survived in original form	51°30′47.7″N 0°5′4.5″W
EH1286384 Church of St Anne and St Agnes 01	St Anne and St Agnes	Gresham Street, Aldersgate, City of London	1676–87	Grade I (1950) 1286384	Substantially rebuilt after the Blitz; rededicated in 1966	51°30′59″N 0°5′47″W
	St Mary Aldermary	Queen Victoria Street, Cordwainer, City of London	1679–82	Grade I (1950) 1079145	Survived in original form; Victorian alterations to the interior made 1876–7	51°30′46″N 0°05′36″W
	St Clement Danes	The Strand, City of Westminster	1680–82	Grade I (1958) 1237099	Destroyed in 1941; reconsecrated in 1958 after the Blitz.	51.513107°N 0.113898°W
	Tom Tower, Christ Church, Oxford	Christ Church, Oxford	1681–82	Grade I (1984) 1198760		51°45′00″N 1°15′24″W
	St Mary Abchurch	Abchurch Lane, Candlewick, City of London	1681–86	Grade I (1950) 1359119	Survived in original form; dome painted in 1708	51°30′42.02″N 0°5′18.05″W
	Royal Hospital Chelsea	Royal Borough of Kensington and Chelsea	1681–1692	Grade I (1969) 1226301		51°29′15″N 0°09′30″W
	Interior of Temple Church	Fleet Street, Farringdon Without, City of London	1682–83	Grade I (1950) 1064646	During the restoration after the Blitz Wren's wooden altar was discovered in a museum and was restored to its original position	51°30′47.52″N 0°06′37.44″W
	St Clement's, Eastcheap	Clement's Lane, Candlewick, City of London	1683–87	Grade I (1950) 1064699	Survived in original form	51°30′40.77″N 0°5′12.81″W
	St Margaret Pattens	Eastcheap, Billingsgate, City of London	1684–87	Grade I (1950) 1286593	Survived in original form	51°30′38.75″N 0°4′58.74″W
	St Michael Paternoster Royal	College Hill, Dowgate, City of London	1686–94	Grade I (1950) 1286707	Spire by Hawksmoor. Substantially rebuilt after the Blitz; restored in 1966–8	51°30′40.22″N 0°5′31.76″W
	St Andrew-by-the-Wardrobe	Queen Victoria Street, Castle Baynard, City of London	1685–95	Grade I (1950) 1079148	Substantially rebuilt after the Blitz; rededicated in 1961	51°30′44.44″N 0°6′4.89″W
	St Margaret Lothbury	Lothbury, Coleman Street Ward and Broad Street Ward, City of London	1686–90	Grade I (1950) 1064634	Survived in original form	51°30′52.91″N 0°5′19.92″W
	St Andrew, Holborn	Holborn Viaduct, Farringdon Without, City of London	1686–87	Grade I (1950) 1064643	Substantially rebuilt after the Blitz; re-opened in 1961	51°31′2.10″N 0°6′24.14″W
	Kensington Palace	Royal Borough of Kensington and Chelsea, London	1689	Grade I (1969) 1223861	Wren expanded the existing Nottingham House, built in 1605	51°30′18″N 0°11′15″W
	Windsor Guildhall	Windsor, Berkshire	1689	Grade I (1950) 1117752	Wren completed the structure, which had begun under the direction of Sir Thomas Fitz	51°28′56″N 0°36′26″W
	Sir John Moore Church of England Primary School	Appleby Magna, Leicestershire	1693–97	Grade I (1952) 1177850		52°40′45″N 1°32′15″W
	Hampton Court Palace	London Borough of Richmond upon Thames	1689	Grade I (1952) 1193127		51°24′11″N 0°20′13″W
	King William Court, Greenwich Hospital	Greenwich, Royal Borough of Greenwich	1698–1703	Grade I (1973) 1211426	West front added by John Vanbrugh in 1728.	51°28′57″N 0°00′21″W
	Queen Mary Court, Greenwich Hospital	Greenwich, Royal Borough of Greenwich	1699–1728	Grade I (1973) 1211384	Completed by John Vanbrugh 1728.	51°28′59″N 0°00′16″W
	Queen Anne Court, Greenwich Hospital	Greenwich, Royal Borough of Greenwich	1699–1750	Grade I (1973) 1290044		51°29′02″N 0°00′18″W
	Extension to the State Apartments	St James's Palace, St James's, City of Westminster	1702	Grade I (1970) 1264851		51°30′15″N 0°08′16″W
	Marlborough House	St James's, City of Westminster	1711	Grade I (1970) 1331701	Additional storeys later added	51°30′18″N 0°08′10″W
	Chapter House	St Paul's Churchyard, Castle Baynard, City of London	1712–1714	Grade II* (1950) 1358896	Severely damaged in the Blitz; reconstructed in 1957	51°30′52″N 0°05′57″W

=== Partially extant works ===
Image	Name	Location	Date	Listing	Comment	Coordinates
	St Olave Old Jewry	Ironmonger Lane, Walbrook, City of London	1670–79	Grade I (1950)	Body of the church was demolished in 1887. Tower is part of an office building.	51°30′52.15″N 0°5′28.70″W
	Christ Church Greyfriars	Newgate Street, Farringdon Within, City of London	1677–91	Grade I (1950)	Destroyed in the Blitz. The ruins are a public garden; the tower is a private residence for Jimmy	51°30′56.94″N 0°5′56.93″W
2017 St Augustine Watling Street	St Augustine Watling Street	Watling Street, Bread Street Ward, City of London	1680–87	Grade I (1950)	Destroyed in the Blitz. Tower part of St Paul's Cathedral Choir School	51°30′48.52″N 00°05′49.00″W
	St Alban's, Wood Street	Wood Street, Bassishaw, City of London	1682–87	Grade II (1950)	Destroyed in the Blitz. The tower is a private dwelling	51°30′59.69″N 0°5′38.95″W
	St Mary Somerset	Upper Thames Street, Queenhithe, City of London	1686–94	Grade I (1950)	Body of the church demolished in 1871. Tower surrounded by small garden	51°30′40.92″N 0°5′48.80″W
	St Dunstan-in-the-East	St Dunstan's Hill, Billingsgate, City of London	1698	Grade I (1950)	Rebuilt in 1817–21, but destroyed in the Blitz. Ruins are a public garden	51°30′34.82″N 0°4′57.80″W

=== Demolished or destroyed works ===
Image	Name	Location	Date	Comment	Coordinates
	Screen, St John's College Chapel	St John's College, Oxford	c. 1670–73	Dismantled in 1843 and fragments moved to Painswick House	51°45′23″N 1°15′31″W
	St Christopher le Stocks	Threadneedle Street, Broad Street Ward, City of London	1670–71	Demolished in 1782 to provide space for the extension of the Bank of England	51.5141°N 0.0886°W
	St Mary Aldermanbury	Aldermanbury, Bassishaw, City of London	1670–74	Ruined in 1940, and the stones transported to Fulton, Missouri in 1964. Rebuilt as a memorial to Sir Winston Churchill	51°30′59.34″N 0°5′35.06″W
	St Michael Wood Street	Wood Street, Cripplegate, City of London	1670–75	Demolished in 1897 due to the Union of Benefices Act 1860	51°30′56″N 0°5′41.5″W
	St Benet Fink	Threadneedle Street, Broad Street Ward, City of London	1670–75	Demolished between 1841 and 1846 to improve the site of the Royal Exchange	51°30′50″N 0°5′10″W
	St Dionis Backchurch	Fenchurch Street, Langbourn, City of London	1670–77	Demolished in 1878 due to the Union of Benefices Act 1860	51°30′43″N 0°5′2″W
	St Mildred, Poultry	Poultry, Cheap, City of London	1670–77	Demolished in 1872 due to the Union of Benefices Act 1860	51°30′49″N 0°5′24″W
	St George Botolph Lane	Botolph Lane, Billingsgate, City of London	1671–76	Demolished in 1904 after being judged structurally unsafe and closed 1901	51°30′38″N 0°5′7″W
	Addition to Richmond House	Whitehall, City of Westminster	c. 1672	Burned in 1791	
	Extension and grotto	Privy Garden, Palace of Whitehall, City of Westminster	1673–75	Burned in 1698	
	Lodgings for the Duke of York	St James's Palace, St James's, City of Westminster	c. 1673	Demolished c. 1703	
	St Michael Bassishaw	Basinghall Street, Bassishaw, City of London	1675–79	Demolished in 1900 after being judged structurally unsafe in 1892	51°31′0.1″N 0°5′30″W
	St Bartholomew-by-the-Exchange	Bartholomew Lane, Broad Street Ward, City of London	1675–83	Demolished in 1840 to provide space for the widening of Threadneedle Street	51.51376°N 0.0873°W
	Renovation of the Chapel Royal	Palace of Whitehall, City of Westminster	1676	Burned in 1698	
	St Stephen Coleman Street	Coleman Street, Coleman Street Ward, City of London	1677	Destroyed in the Blitz and demolished in 1940	51.5155°N 0.0904°W
	St Mildred, Bread Street	Bread Street, Bread Street Ward, City of London	1677–83	Destroyed in the Blitz and demolished in 1941	51.5123°N 0.0952°W
	St Anne's Church, Soho	Dean Street, Soho, City of Westminster	1677–85	The body of the church by Wren and William Talman was destroyed in the Blitz and later totally demolished; the preserved tower was built by S.P. Cockerell in 1801–03	51.5124°N 0.1323°W
	St Michael Queenhithe	Upper Thames Street, Queenhithe, City of London	1676–86	Demolished in 1876 due to the Union of Benefices Act 1860	51°30′40″N 0°5′42″W
	All-Hallows-the-Great	Upper Thames Street, Dowgate, City of London	1677–84	Demolished in 1894 due to the Union of Benefices Act 1860	51.5100°N 0.0902°W
	St Swithin, London Stone	Cannon Street, Walbrook, City of London	1678	Destroyed in the Blitz and demolished in 1962	51°30′42″N 0°5′22″W
	St Antholin, Budge Row	Watling Street, Cordwainer, City of London	1678–84	Demolished in 1875 due to the Union of Benefices Act 1860	51°30′45″N 0°05′31″W
	St Benet Gracechurch	Gracechurch Street, Bridge, City of London	1681–87	Demolished in 1868 due to the Union of Benefices Act 1860	51°30′42″N 0°5′6″W
	All Hallows Bread Street	Bread Street, Bread Street Ward, City of London	1681–98	Demolished in 1878 due to the Union of Benefices Act 1860	51.5131°N 0.0951°W
	King's House, Winchester	Hampshire	1682–1685	Work on the structure was never completed; the building was ultimately converted into barracks and gutted by fire in 1894	51°03′43″N 1°19′16″W
	St Matthew Friday Street	Friday Street, Bread Street Ward, City of London	1682–85	Demolished in 1885 due to the Union of Benefices Act 1860	51°30′49″N 0°5′44″W
	Privy Garden Range	Palace of Whitehall, City of Westminster	1685	Burned in 1698	
	Roman Catholic Chapel	Palace of Whitehall, City of Westminster	1685–86	Burned in 1698	
	All Hallows Lombard Street	Lombard Street, Langbourn, City of London	1686–94	Demolished in 1939, with the tower and interior fittings moved to All Hallows Twickenham	51°30′39.09″N 0°5′5.84″W
	St Mary Magdalen Old Fish Street	Old Change, Castle Baynard, City of London	1683–87	Demolished in 1893 due to the Union of Benefices Act 1860	51°30′45″N 0°5′51″W
	St Michael, Crooked Lane	Miles's Lane, Candlewick, City of London	1687	Demolished in 1831: wider approaches were needed for the rebuilt London Bridge	51.51070°N 0.087280°W
	College of Physicians, Warwick Lane		1688–89	Destroyed 1866	51°30′56″N 0°06′04″W
	Library for Thomas Tenison		1688	Demolished for the building of the National Gallery	
	Queen's Privy Lodgings	Palace of Whitehall, City of Westminster	1688	Burned in 1698	
	River Terrace Garden	Palace of Whitehall, City of Westminster	1691		
	Writing School, Christ's Hospital	Newgate Street, Farringdon Within, City of London	1692–95	Draughtsmanship and style consistent with Hawksmoor, who may have been involved; demolished in 1902	
	Remodelling of the House of Commons	St Stephen's Chapel, Old Palace of Westminster, City of Westminster	1692	Burned in 1834	
	Gallery for the House of Lords	Old Palace of Westminster, City of Westminster	1704	Dismantled in 1711	

== Unbuilt works ==
Image	Name	Location	Designed	Notes
	Early scheme for rebuilding Whitehall Palace		1660s	
	Remodelling of Old St Paul's Cathedral	St Paul's Churchyard, Castle Baynard, City of London	1666	Old St Paul's Cathedral was severely damaged by the Great Fire of London and Wren's proposed additions were never realized. Wren ultimately designed its replacement.
	London Plan	London	1666	Wren's masterplan for the rebuilding of London after the Great Fire
	Commencement (Senate) House	University of Cambridge, Cambridge	c. 1675	
	Arundel House	St James's, City of Westminster	c. 1676	Building executed to designs likely supplied by Edward Pearce.
	Rebuilding of Royal Mews	Charing Cross, City of Westminster	c. 1676	
	Mausoleum for Charles I	Windsor Castle, Windsor, Berkshire	1678	Not financed
	Proposal for renovation of Ingestre Hall	Ingestre, Staffordshire	c. 1684-85	
	Church	Lincoln's Inn Fields, Holborn and Covent Garden	c. 1695–96	
	Post-fire scheme for rebuilding the Palace of Whitehall	Palace of Whitehall, City of Westminster	1698	
	Renovation of Upper Ward	Windsor Castle, Windsor, Berkshire	1698	
	College Bridge	St John's College, Cambridge	c. 1698	Though ultimately executed to a design by Grumbold, the bridge is today known as the Wren Bridge
	Cottonian Library	Old Palace of Westminster, City of Westminster	1703	
	St Mary le Strand	Strand, City of Westminster	1713	Ultimately executed to the design of James Gibbs
	Hyde Park Barracks	Hyde Park	1713	

== Purported works ==
A number of structure have, without supporting documentary evidence, been attributed to Christopher Wren. Speaking of this tendency, biographer Adrian Tinniswood has written that "If Wren was connected with a building, however remotely, it was slotted into the rapidly expanding canon."

Image	Name	Location	Date	Listing	Legitimacy	Coordinates
	Second Theatre Royal, Drury Lane	Covent Garden, London	1674		Attribution challenged by some contemporary scholars; it is unknown how closely the attributed design was followed.	
	Church of St Mary the Virgin	Ingestre, Stafford, Staffordshire	1676			52.81974°N 2.03602°W
	Royal Hospital Kilmainham	Kilmainham, Dublin, Ireland	1679–87		Now attributed to William Robinson.	53.34290°N 6.30003°W
	Tring Park Mansion	Tring, Hertfordshire	1682–84	Grade II* (1981)	Though "probably [designed] by Wren," the structure was substantially altered in the late 19th century.	51°47′30″N 0°39′27″W
	Boone's Chapel	Blackheath, London	1683	Grade I (1954)		51°27′31″N 0°00′10″E
	Fawley Court	Fawley, Buckinghamshire	1684	Grade I (1952)		51°33′06″N 0°53′52″W
	Upper School, Eton College	Berkshire	1689–91		Destroyed and since rebuilt	
	Morden College	Blackheath, London	1695	Grade I (1951)		51°28′10″N 0°01′09″E
	Wren Building	College of William & Mary, Williamsburg, Virginia, United States	1700	National Historic Landmark	Claimed to be a Wren building as early as 1724. Wren's connection is doubtful.	37°16′15″N 76°42′32″W
	Winslow Hall	Winslow, Buckinghamshire	1700	Grade I (1959)	The structure's architect has been debated but it "is likely to have been" Wren.	51°56′29″N 0°52′48″W
	Orangery, Kensington Palace	Royal Borough of Kensington and Chelsea, London	1704–1706	Grade I (1969) 1223783	"designed ostensibly by Wren, but more likely the work of Hawksmoor and (perhaps) Vanbrugh"	51°30′24″N 0°11′16″W
	All Saints' Church, Isleworth	Isleworth, London Borough of Hounslow	1705–06	Grade II* (1951)	According to tradition, Wren's plans were significantly altered due to financial constraints.	51°28′18″N 0°19′11″W

== Bibliography ==
- Betjeman, John (1992) [1967], Sovereign City of London Churches, Andover: Pitkin, ISBN 978-0-85372-565-7
- Godwin, George (1839), Churches of London, Vols.1–2, C. Tilt
- Huelin, G. (1996), Vanished Churches of the City of London, London: Guildhall Library Publications, ISBN 978-0-900422-42-3
- Reynolds, H. (1922), The Churches of the City of London, London: The Bodley Head Limited
