= Stuart Fraser (politician) =

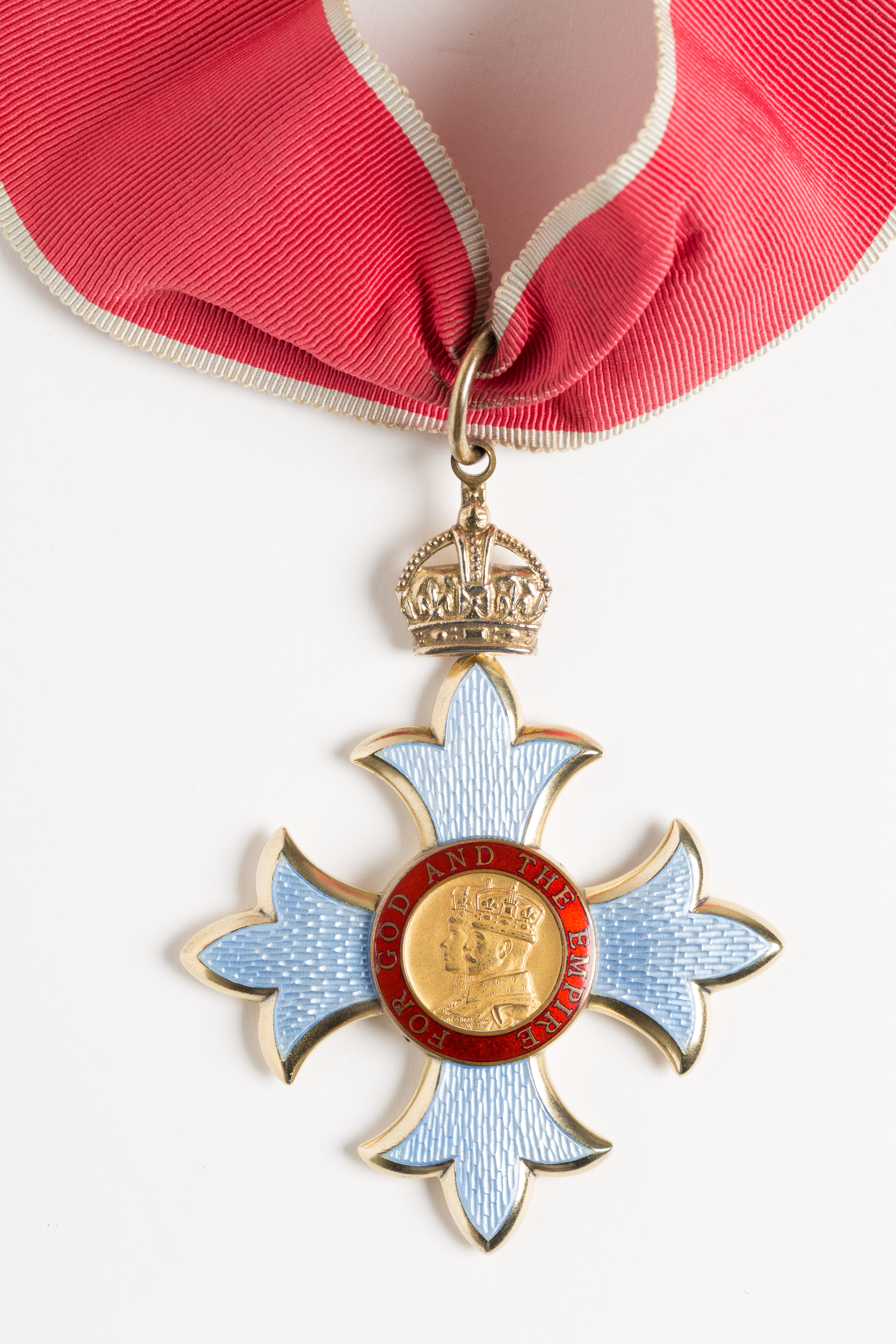
CBE neck decoration

Stuart John Fraser CBE (born 13 April 1946), is a British stockbroker and City of London Councilman. He served as its Chairman of the Policy and Resources Committee from 2008 until 2012.

== Life ==
A director of Brewin Dolphin, Fraser was first elected to the Court of Common Council representing Coleman Street Ward in 1992.

Upon being appointed Chairman of the City of London Policy and Resources Committee, Fraser said that he viewed the 2008 financial crisis a "phoney crisis" and that he "would still like the City of London to dominate the world." In 2010 he claimed to be probably the most effective lobbyist in the UK.

Appointed CBE in 2012, Fraser served as Master of the Worshipful Company of Fletchers for 2016/17.

Political offices
Preceded by Sir Michael Snyder	Chairman of the Policy and Resources Committee; City of London Corporation; May 2008 – May 2012	Succeeded by Sir Mark Boleat
