= Queen Street, London =

Street in the City of London

Queen Street
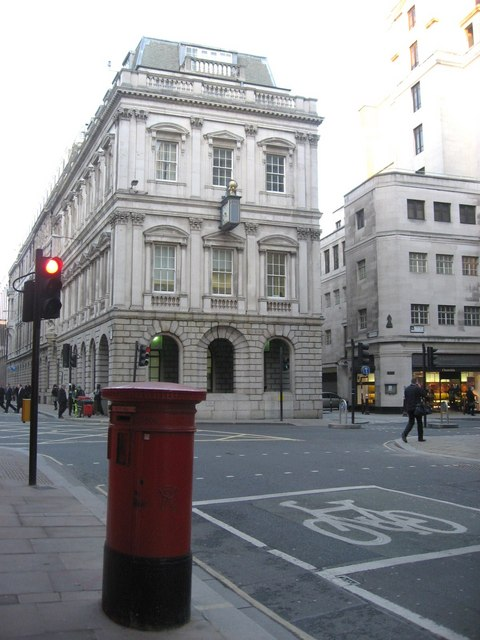
- At the end of Queen Street looking north toward King Street (the building in the centre is 1 King Street)
- Interactive map of Queen Street
- Length: 0.2 mi (0.32 km)
- Location: London, United Kingdom
- Postal code: EC4
- Coordinates: 51.513°N 0.0925°W
- South end: Upper Thames Street
- North end: Cheapside/King Street

Queen Street is a street in the City of London which runs between Upper Thames Street at its southern end to Cheapside in the north. The thoroughfares of Queen Street and King Street (Note: Not to be confused with King Street in Covent Garden, in the City of Westminster) (a northward continuation of Queen Street beyond Cheapside) were newly laid out, cutting across more ancient routes in the City, following the Great Fire of London in 1666; they were the only notable new streets following the fire's destruction of much of the City.

At the lower (southern) end of Queen Street is Southwark Bridge. The London Chamber of Commerce & Industry is located at No. 33. At the upper (northern) end the street crosses Cheapside and becomes King Street, which leads to Gresham Street and the Guildhall. This creates a direct route from the River Thames at Southwark Bridge up to the Guildhall. Queen Street meets the newer Queen Victoria Street as well as Cannon Street. Minor roads off the street include Skinners Lane (the home of the Worshipful Company of Skinners) and Cloak Lane.

Two short sections of the street are pedestrianised, which together with a pedestrian-priority crossing of Cannon Street, forms a "Central Plaza" area. This was part of an award-winning public realm improvement scheme undertaken in 2006. This pedestrianised part of Queen Street has been used as a location for a number of art events organised by the City of London Festival and the London Architectural Biennale.

Queen Street and King Street form part of an important route on the London Cycle Network which continues south over Southwark Bridge and north towards Moorgate.

Queen Street runs through the wards of Vintry and Cordwainer, and is in the postal code area EC4. King Street is in the ward of Cheap and in postcode area EC2.

King Street formed part of the marathon course of the 2012 Olympic and Paralympic Games. The women's Olympic marathon took place on 5 August and the men's on 12 August. The four Paralympic marathons were held on 9 September.
