= Cordwainer (ward) =

Ward of the City of London

Coordinates: 51.51285°N 0.09324°W

- Ward
- Location within Greater London
- Cordwainer ward boundaries since 2013
- OS grid reference: TQ323811
- Sui generis: City of London
- Administrative area: Greater London
- Region: London
- Country: England
- Sovereign state: United Kingdom
- Post town: LONDON
- Postcode district: EC2
- Dialling code: 020
- Police: City of London
- Fire: London
- Ambulance: London
- UK Parliament: Cities of London and Westminster
- London Assembly: City and East

Cordwainer is a small, almost rectangular-shaped ward in the City of London, England. It is named after the cordwainers, the professional shoemakers who historically lived and worked in this particular area of London; there is a Livery Company for the trade, the Worshipful Company of Cordwainers. The ward is sometimes referred to as the "Cordwainers' ward".

It is bounded to the north by Poultry and Cheapside (the boundary with Cheap ward); to the west by the eponymous Bread Street and the ward of the same name; to the south by Cannon Street (and Vintry and Dowgate wards); and to the east by Walbrook ward and a street of the same name.

Streets within Cordwainer's boundaries are, amongst others, Bow Lane, Pancras Lane and part of Watling Street. Queen Street runs north–south through the centre of the ward.

== Former precincts ==
In mediaeval times and long before the most recent boundary changes in 2003, Cordwainer was divided into eight precincts:

- St. Mary, Aldermary, upper and lower
- Allhallows, Bread Street
- St. Mary-le-Bow
- St. Antholin, upper and lower
- St. Pancras
- St. Bennet, Sherehog and St. John
- St. Thomas the Apostle
- Trinity

== 21st century ==
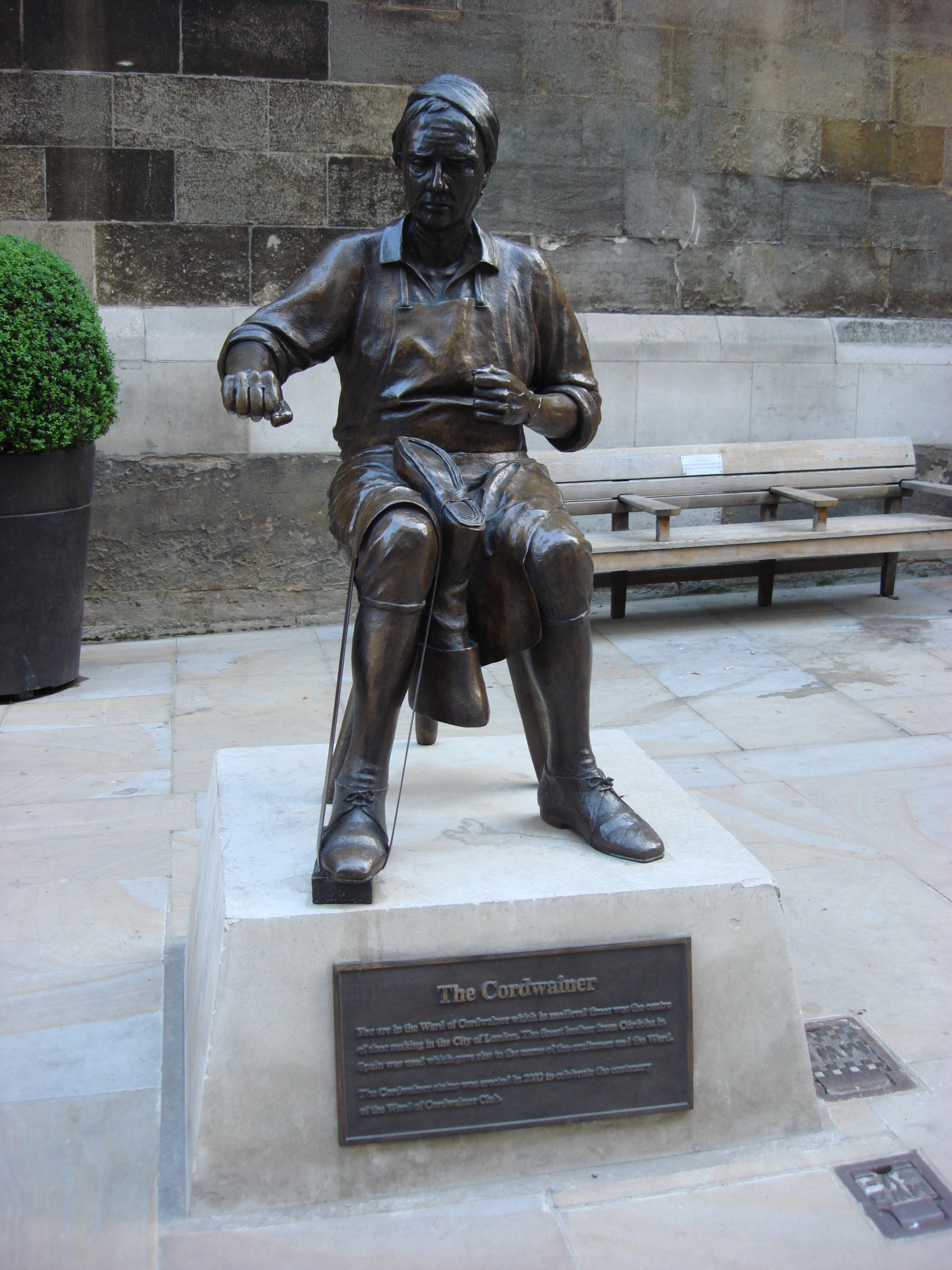
A statue of a cordwainer in the ward.

The contemporary ward is home to many large businesses and new initiatives such as Bow Bells House, named after the bells of St Mary-le-Bow church—and not, as sometimes thought, after the area of Bow. Cordwainer contains one other church, St Mary Aldermary, and the site of St Antholin, Budge Row, demolished in 1875. Cordwainer ward is quite distinctive for its high number of licensed premises.

== Ward of Cordwainer Club ==
The Ward of Cordwainer Club was founded in 1902 and has 260 members. The clubs role is

- the encouragement of interest in the affairs of the City of London,
- the generation a friendly spirit
- the improvement the quality of life mainly within the Ward.

It further aims to lend support to the municipal officials of the ward.

== Politics ==
Cordwainer is one of 25 ancient wards of the City of London, each electing an alderman to the Court of Aldermen and commoners (the City equivalent of a councillor) elected to the Court of Common Council of the City of London Corporation. Only electors who are Freemen of the City are eligible to stand for election. The current Alderman is Roger Gifford and the current Common Councilmen are: Mark Boleat, Michael Snyder and Alex Barr.

Cordwainer Ward
Party	Candidate	Votes	%	±%
Independent	Alex Barr	92	32	n/a
Independent	Michael Snyder	79	28	n/a
Independent	Mark Boleat	77	27	n/a
Independent	Gillian Kaile	21	7	n/a
Independent	Timothy Becker	15	5	n/a
Turnout		284		n/a
Independent hold		Swing		
Independent hold		Swing		
Independent hold		Swing		
