= Emily Benn =

British politician

The Honourable Emily Benn
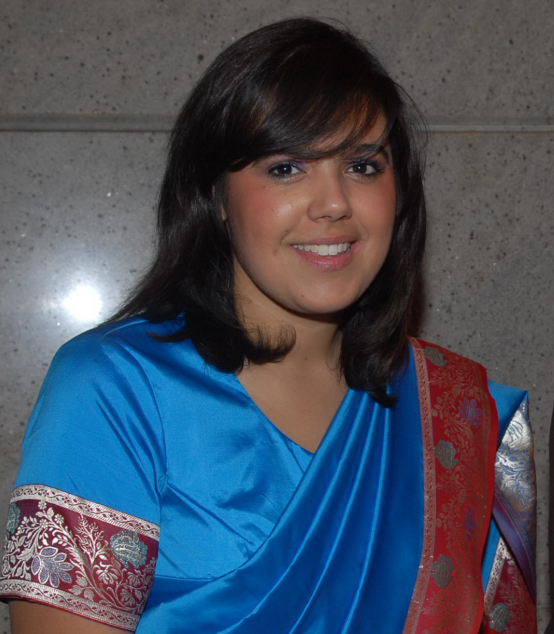
- Benn in 2009

Common Councillor for City of London Common Council
- Incumbent
- Assumed office 24 March 2022

Councillor for Croydon Borough Council
- In office 23 May 2014 – 10 March 2016
- Ward: West Thornton
- Majority: 1,777

Personal details
- Born: Emily Sophia Wedgwood Benn; 4 October 1989 (age 37) Croydon, London, England
- Party: Independent (2022–present)
- Other political affiliations: Labour
- Parents: Stephen Benn (father); Nita Clarke (mother)
- Relatives: Tony Benn (grandfather); Caroline Benn (grandmother); Hilary Benn (uncle); Melissa Benn (aunt)
- Education: New College, Oxford
- Occupation: Investment banking
- Website: democracy.cityoflondon.gov.uk/mgUserInfo.aspx?UID=2871

Emily Sophia Wedgwood Benn (born 4 October 1989) is an English politician, who has represented the Ward of Bread Street on the Court of Common Council of the City of London since 2022.

Benn unsuccessfully contested both the 2010 and 2015 UK general elections as a Labour Party parliamentary candidate. At the 2014 local elections, Benn was elected to the West Thornton Ward of Croydon Borough Council, serving until 2016. At the 2022 local elections, she was elected to represent Bread Street Ward on the City Common Council.

The granddaughter of the late Labour MP Tony Benn, she is the eldest child and only daughter of the 3rd Viscount Stansgate by his wife Nita Clarke (née Bowes).

== Early and family life ==
Emily Sophia Wedgwood Benn was born 4 October 1989 in Croydon, London, where the 1989 Labour Party Conference was being held, as the daughter of a viscount, she is entitled to be styled as The Honourable. Benn is a quarter-Indian on her mother's side. She claims that her first political experience was campaigning for her grandfather in his Chesterfield constituency during the 1992 general election aged two and she joined the Labour Party at the age of 14.

Four generations of her family have served as British Members of Parliament (MP) – her uncle Hilary Benn, her grandfather Tony Benn, her great-grandfather William Wedgwood Benn and her great-great-grandfathers, Sir John Benn and Daniel Holmes.

== Education ==
Benn attended Wallington High School for Girls where she achieved 11 A* grades in her GCSEs. She then studied Music, History and Latin for A-levels at St Olave's Grammar School, Orpington, before reading History and Politics at New College, Oxford.

== Professional career ==
After university, Benn joined the graduate training programme at UBS Investment Bank, then the multi-asset sales team at the bank in London. In 2016 she started working for UBS in New York City.

In 2018 Benn was a graduate research assistant at the John F. Kennedy School of Government at Harvard University, helping to write a book on ageing demographics with Camilla Cavendish. She later worked as Chief of Staff for Jonathan Powell before becoming Chief of Staff of Tortoise Media.

== Political career ==
=== Parliamentary candidate ===
On 12 September 2007, three weeks before her eighteenth birthday, Benn was selected as the Labour Party candidate for the West Sussex constituency of East Worthing and Shoreham at the 2010 general election.

The sitting MP, Conservative Tim Loughton, defending a majority over Labour of 8,183 votes from the 2005 general election, defeated Benn, who finished in third place, 4,276 votes behind the Liberal Democrat candidate in second place, while Loughton increased his majority to 11,105 votes.

On 16 July 2014, Benn was selected as the Labour Party candidate for Croydon South for the 2015 general election. She increased the Labour vote share by 4.8%, but was defeated by Conservative candidate Chris Philp.

=== Local councillor ===
In July 2013, Benn was selected as one of three Labour candidates for the ward of West Thornton on Croydon Borough Council in the 2014 local council elections. In May 2014, she was elected top of the ballot with a majority of 1,777. She resigned as a Councillor in 2016 after accepting a job in New York City.

Benn served on the Board of Trustees of the London Youth Games and London Mozart Players.

Benn returned to local politics in 2022, being elected to the Ward of Bread Street on the City of London Common Council as an independent at the 2022 election.

=== Andrew Fisher complaint ===
In the autumn of 2015, Benn formally complained about Andrew Fisher, Jeremy Corbyn's head of policy, for supporting the group Class War at the general election earlier that year; Fisher was suspended. The Guardian also stated that 'Fisher Supporters' had pointed out that a page titled 'Emily Benn for Croydon South' on Facebook published a retweet suggesting Labour members who were '"disappointed" with Corbyn's "male dominated" leadership join the Women's Equality Party.

== Electoral history ==
=== 2022 City of London Corporation election ===
Bread Street (2 seats)
Party	Candidate	Votes	%	±%
Independent	Emily Benn	105	37.5	N/A
Independent	Giles Shilson*	84	30.0	▼10.1
Independent	Stephen Hodgson	60	21.4	N/A
Women's Equality	Harini Iyengar	31	11.1	N/A
Turnout		280		—
Independent hold				

=== 2015 general election ===
General election 2015: Croydon South
Party	Candidate	Votes	%	±%
Conservative	Chris Philp	31,448	54.5	+3.6
Labour	Emily Benn	14,308	24.8	+4.8
UKIP	Kathleen Garner	6,068	10.5	+6.1
Liberal Democrats	Gill Hickson	3,448	6.0	−16.9
Green	Peter Underwood	2,154	3.7	+2.0
Putting Croydon First!	Mark Samuel	221	0.4	N/A
Class War	Jon Bigger	65	0.1	N/A
Majority		17,410	29.7	
Turnout		57,712	70.4	+1.1
Conservative hold		Swing	-0.6%	

=== 2010 general election ===
General election 2010: East Worthing and Shoreham
Party	Candidate	Votes	%	±%
Conservative	Tim Loughton	23,458	48.5	+4.6
Liberal Democrats	James Doyle	12,353	25.5	+1.2
Labour	Emily Benn	8,087	16.7	−8.8
UKIP	Mike Glennon	2,984	6.2	+1.4
Green	Susan Board	1,126	2.3	N/A
English Democrat	Clive Maltby	389	0.8	N/A
Majority		11,105	22.9	
Turnout		48,397	65.4	+3.6
Conservative hold		Swing	+1.7	

== See also ==
- City of London Corporation
- Viscount Stansgate
