= Dominic Christian =

Councilman of the City of London

- Education: St Joseph's College, Ipswich; University of East Anglia
- Years active: 1984-

Dominic Gerard Christian is a British insurance executive and civic politician. He is Global Chairman of Aon’s Reinsurance Solutions and a member of Aon’s Global Executive Committee.

He represents the Lime Street Ward on the Court of Common Council of the City of London Corporation and served as Deputy Chair of the Lloyd's of London’s between 2019 and 2023. He is noted for his leadership within the insurance market, as well as his advocacy on sustainability, climate risk, and diversity and inclusion.

== Early life and education ==
Christian attended St Joseph's College, Ipswich, before studying history at the University of East Anglia, where he graduated with a BA in 1982. In 2015 the university conferred on him an honorary Doctorate of Civil Law in recognition of his contributions to the insurance sector, education and public service.

== Career ==
=== Early career and Benfield ===
Christian began working in reinsurance in 1984 as an international facultative broker with JK Buckenham.

In 1989 he joined Greig Fester as a treaty broker specialising in retrocession and became a director in 1995. After Greig Fester was acquired by Benfield Group in 1997, he continued to lead its retrocession operations. He joined the board of Benfield plc in 2004 and was appointed CEO of Benfield Ltd. and Benfield Group International in 2005.

=== Aon ===
Following Aon’s acquisition of Benfield in 2008, Christian assumed a series of senior roles including International CEO, Co-CEO, Executive Chairman (International) of Aon Benfield, and CEO of Aon UK Ltd. Since 2018 he has served as Global Chairman of Aon Reinsurance Solutions and sits on Aon’s Global Executive Committee.

=== Lloyd’s of London ===
Christian was first elected to the Council of Lloyd’s in 2013. He was Deputy Chair of the Council between 2019 and February 2023, during which Lloyd’s advanced reforms in culture, performance, and sustainability. He chairs Inclusion@Lloyd’s, the cross-market body promoting diversity and inclusion, and in 2015 co-founded, alongside Inga Beale, the Dive In Festival, which has expanded to more than 40 countries. He is also President of Lloyd’s Football Club and Lloyd’s Art Club, although his fitness levels and talent preclude active participation in either.

=== City of London Corporation ===
Since 2016 Christian has represented the Lime Street Ward on the Court of Common Council, to which he has been re-elected. He has also served on various committees and spoken internationally on sustainable finance, including at OECD events.

== Activism ==
Christian has been an advocate for greater diversity, equity, and inclusion in the insurance industry. As chair of Inclusion@Lloyd’s, he has promoted initiatives to improve representation across gender, ethnicity, and LGBTQ+ communities. In 2015, he co-founded the Dive In Festival with Inga Beale, which has since become a global event for advancing inclusion and cultural change across the insurance market.

Between 2018 and 2022 Christian chaired ClimateWise, an industry initiative hosted by the Cambridge Institute for Sustainability Leadership. He has spoken widely on the role of insurers in addressing the climate protection gap and serves as a board observer at Save Money Cut Carbon as well as non-executive chairman of ZPE Ltd.

Christian also contributed to the Dasgupta Review on the Economics of Biodiversity, published in 2021, and to the UK Department for International Trade’s Business of Resilience Report (2021). Between 2021 and 2024, he was a member of the Race Equality Commission.

== Other Roles ==
He was also an executive producer of the film Love Without Walls (2022), which addressed themes of homelessness. For 2015/16, he was President of the Insurance Institute of London, and he serves as Director of Faye Francis Limited.

Beyond his industry work, Christian has supported social causes through trusteeships and charitable activity. He has served as trustee or chair of organizations focused on youth, health, sport, and the arts, including the StandUp Foundation,Sainsbury Centre for Visual Arts, the Bermuda Society, the Juvenile Diabetes Research Foundation, and the Gloucester 1682 Trust. His activism combines advocacy at a global corporate level with engagement in community and cultural initiatives.

== Awards and Recognition ==
Christian’s industry awards include Reactions magazine’s Reinsurance CEO of the Year (2010, 2011, 2012) and its Lifetime Achievement Award (2015, 2019). He was also listed among the Financial Times / HERoes Top 30 Male Champions of Women in Business (2017–2019) and ranked in the EMpower Top Ten Advocates between 2018 and 2021.

== Personal life ==
Christian is married to Kate, a Canadian national, and the couple have two children. His interests include history, architecture, sport, the arts, civic affairs, and a fondness for lakes, trees, and cats.
