= St Michael, Crooked Lane =

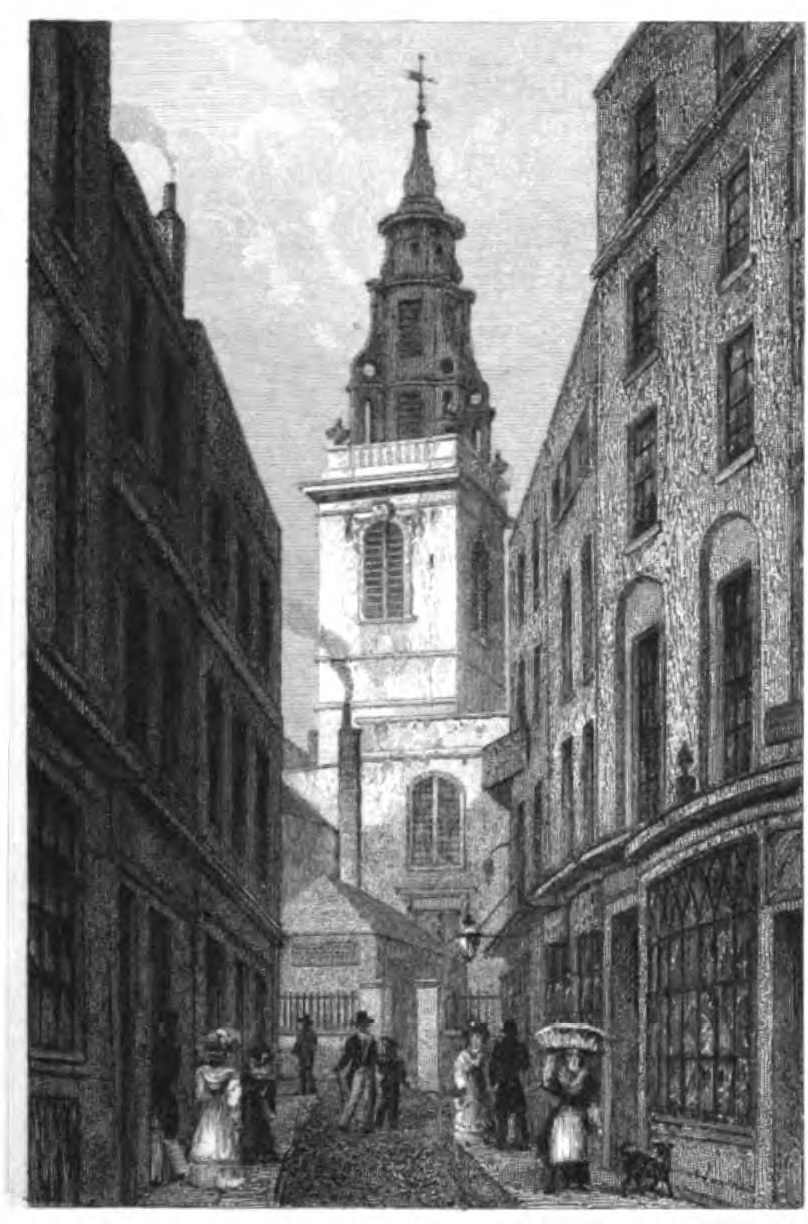
- St Michael, Crooked Lane
- Location: Miles' Lane, London
- Country: England
- Denomination: Church of England

Architecture
- Architect: Christopher Wren
- Style: Baroque
- Demolished: 1831

Coordinates: 51.51070°N 0.087280°W

St Michael, Crooked Lane, was an ancient parish church situated on the east side of Miles's Lane in Candlewick ward in the City of London. It was rebuilt after the Great Fire of London by Sir Christopher Wren, and demolished in 1831.

== History ==
The church was in existence by 1304. It was originally a small church, standing amongst the slaughter-yards of the butchers of Eastcheap. In 1336, it was rebuilt on a much larger scale by John Lovekyn, four-times Lord Mayor of London; later it received further benefactions from Sir William Walworth, who was Lord Mayor in 1374. The patronage of the church belonged first to the prior and convent of Christ Church, Canterbury until 1408, and later to the Archbishop of Canterbury, becoming one of 13 peculiarities in the City of London belonging to him.

It was in the parish that the first cases of The Plague occurred in 1665.

After its destruction in the Great Fire of London, the church was rebuilt by Sir Christopher Wren in 1687. The interior of the new church was 78 feet long, 46 feet wide and 32 feet high, with round-headed windows. James Peller Malcolm called Wren's church "so plain as to be indescribable", noting only the Corinthian reredos, "the usual tablets" and the lack of an organ. There was a Portland stone tower, about 100 feet high, topped with a perforated parapet, with vases at its angles, and a spire—described by James Elmes as "remarkably picturesque"—with clock, weather-vane and cross.

In 1789, Thomas Townsend left a house and funds to the Merchant Taylors Company to endow a weekly lecture and a clerical post at the church. His widow Susannah (d. 1810) left further funds to support this work. In 1831, the bequest was transferred to the church of St Magnus the Martyr.

The church was demolished in 1831 to make way for the wider approaches needed for the rebuilt London Bridge. Its parish was united with that of St Magnus the Martyr. The final service on Sunday 20 March 1831 had to be abandoned due to the effects of the building work. The Rector of St Michael preached a sermon the following Sunday at St Magnus lamenting the demolition of his church with its monuments and "the disturbance of the worship of his parishioners on the preceding Sabbath". A stained-glass window in the church of St Magnus commemorates the former parish. Some of the monuments in the demolished church are now located in St Mark's Church, Kennington.

Part of the burial ground of St Michael, located between Fish Street Hill and King William Street, survived as an open space until 1987 when it was compulsorily purchased to facilitate the extension of the Docklands Light Railway into the City. The remains were reburied at Brookwood Cemetery.

Washington Irving gave a long description of the church in The Sketch Book (published in 1819), in the chapter entitled "The Boar's Head Tavern, Eastcheap". In searching for any remnants of Shakespeare's Falstaff, Irving hears about a picture of the original tavern in St Michael's Church, but to no avail.

== See also ==
- List of Christopher Wren churches in London
- List of churches rebuilt after the Great Fire but since demolished
