= Michael Snyder (accountant) =

British businessman (born 1950)

Sir Michael John Snyder (born 30 July 1950) is a British businessman and politician. He is Deputy Grand Master of the United Grand Lodge of England, having previously been Metropolitan Grand Master of the Freemasons of London.

== Business career ==
Snyder joined Kingston Smith as a trainee in 1968 and became a managing partner in 1979. He played a leadership role in the company, becoming a senior partner in 1990. He stepped down from the board in 2016, but was retained as a consultant. In 2015 he joined the board of Metro Bank with a view to developing Metro Bank’s small business lending operations.

== Political career ==
Snyder is a politician in the City of London and has served as an elected representative for Cordwainer Ward on the Court of Common Council since 1986. He served as chairman of the Policy and Resources Committee from 2003 to 2008, as well as the Finance Committee, and the Barbican Estate Committee. He is currently the chairman of the Capital Buildings Committee. He was knighted in 2008 for services to Business and to the City of London Corporation.

== Freemasonry ==
Snyder served as Metropolitan Grand Master of the Freemasons of London since December 2015., and in 2024 was promoted to Deputy Grand Master of the United Grand Lodge of England.

== Personal life ==
Snyder was born on 30 July 1950. He was educated at Brentwood School, Essex, where he is now a governor.

Political offices
Preceded by	Chair of the Policy and Resources Committee; City of London Corporation; 2003–2008	Succeeded by Stuart Fraser
