= Cheap (ward) =

Ward of the City of London

Coordinates: 51.5148°N 0.094°W

- Ward
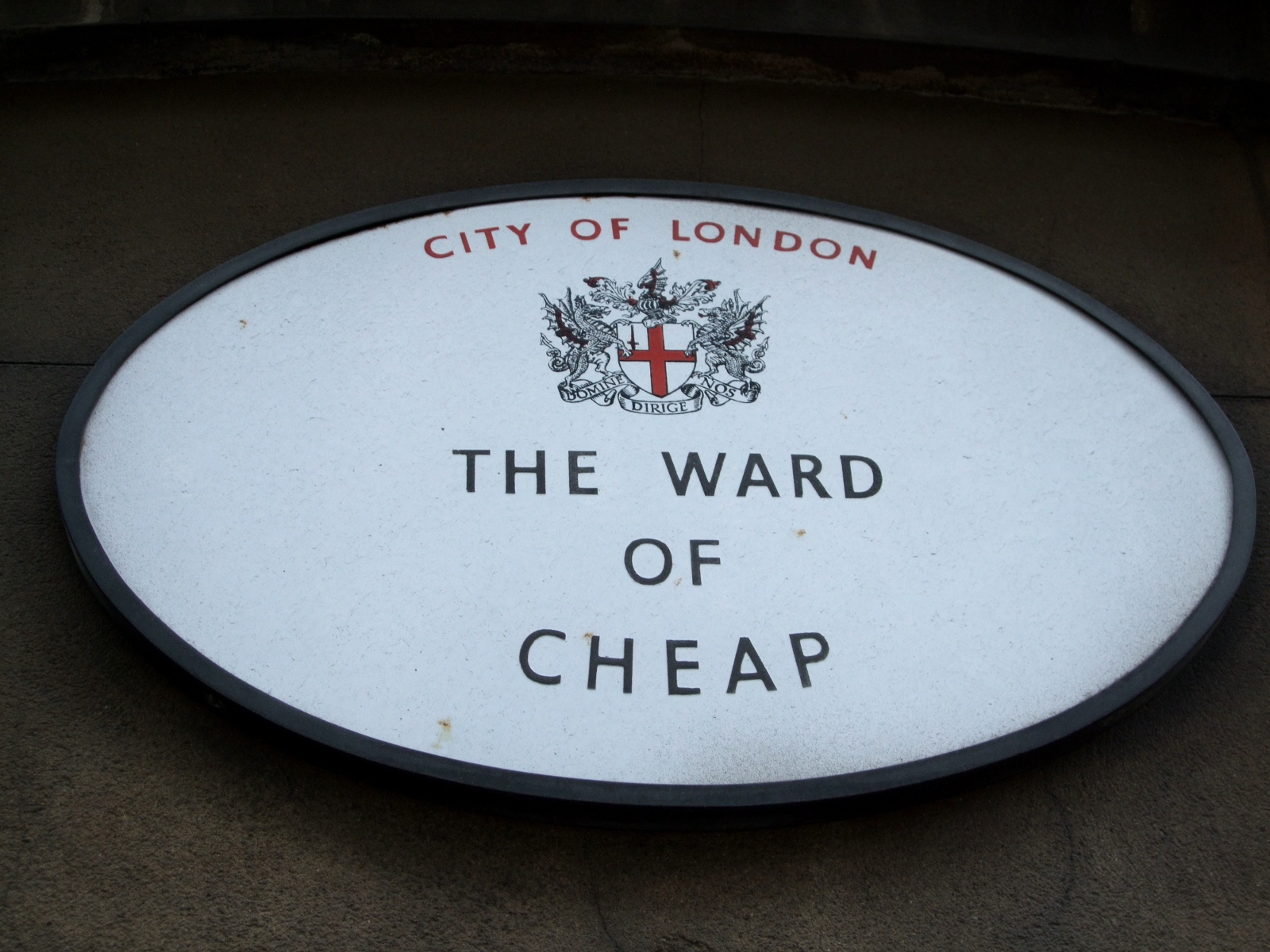
- Street plaque

- Location within Greater London
- Cheap ward boundaries since 2013
- OS grid reference: TQ321812
- Sui generis: City of London
- Administrative area: Greater London
- Region: London
- Country: England
- Sovereign state: United Kingdom
- Post town: LONDON
- Postcode district: EC1, EC4
- Dialling code: 020
- Police: City of London
- Fire: London
- Ambulance: London
- UK Parliament: Cities of London and Westminster
- London Assembly: City and East

Cheap is a small ward in the City of London, England. It stretches west to east from King Edward Street, the border with Farringdon Within ward, to Old Jewry, which adjoins Walbrook; and north to south from Gresham Street, the border with Aldersgate and Bassishaw wards, to Cheapside, the boundary with Cordwainer and Bread Street wards. The name Cheap derives from the Middle English word "cheep, cheap" for "market".

The following roads run north to south across the ward: St. Martin's Le Grand, Foster Lane, Gutter Lane, Wood Street, Milk Street, King Street, and Ironmonger Lane. Within its boundaries are two Anglican churches: St Vedast Foster Lane and St Lawrence Jewry; a third church, St Mildred, Poultry, was demolished in 1872. Several Livery Halls are located in Cheap, including those of the Mercers', Goldsmiths', Wax Chandlers' and Saddlers' Companies.

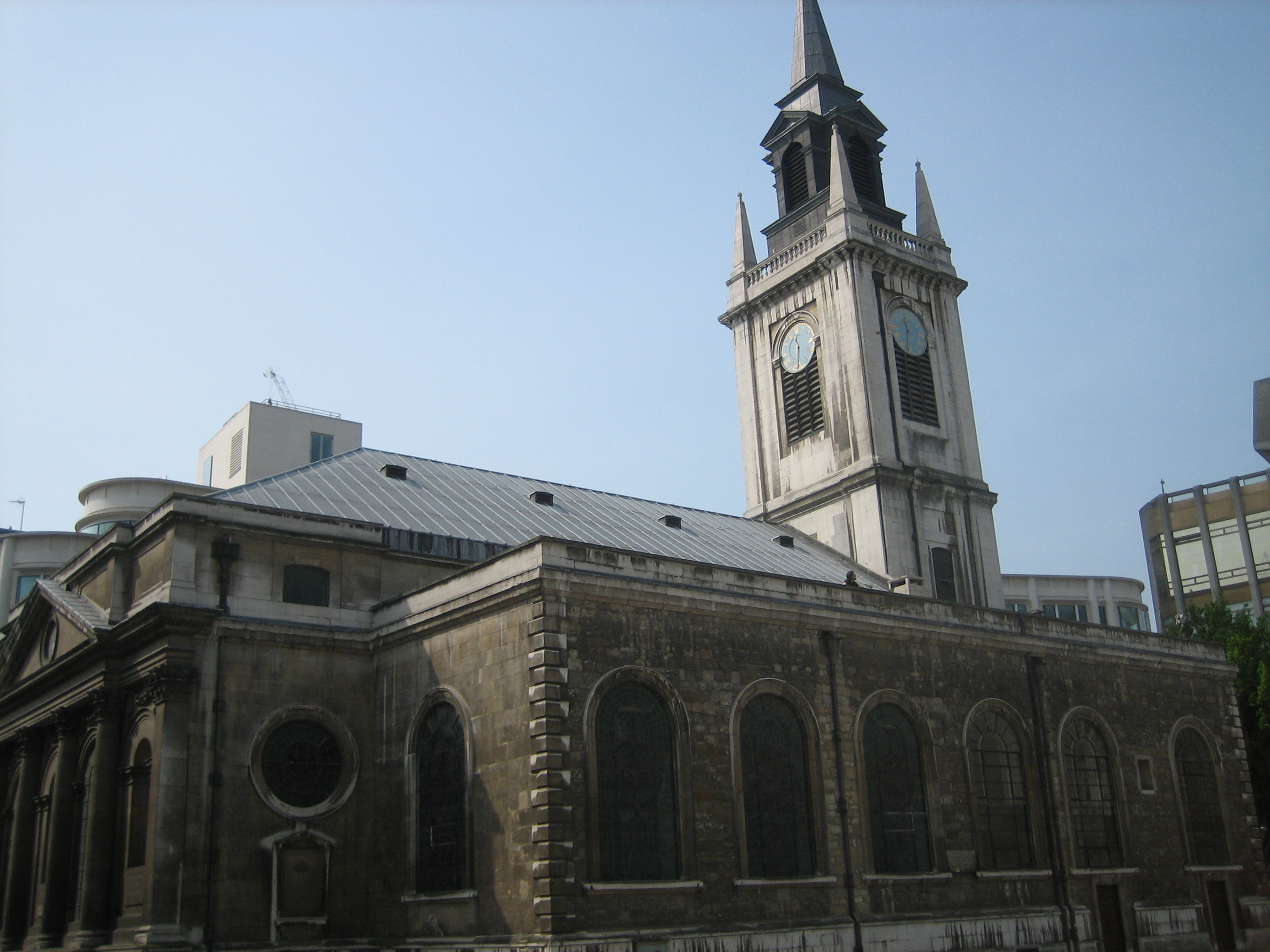
St Lawrence Jewry in Gresham Street

A small part of the Guildhall lies within the ward's boundaries: the main entrance and main hall itself; the remainder is in Bassishaw. Also within Cheap are the Lord Mayor's and City of London Court and the southern end of Basinghall Street.

== Politics ==
Cheap is one of 25 wards in the City of London, each electing an Alderman to the Court of Aldermen and Commoners (the City equivalent of a Councillor) to the Court of Common Council of the City of London Corporation. Only those who are Freemen of the City of London are eligible to stand for election.

The ward is currently represented by Alderman Robert Hughes-Penney as well as three Common Councilmen.
