= Bread Street =

Ward of the City of London

Coordinates: 51.5144°N 0.0966°W

- Ward
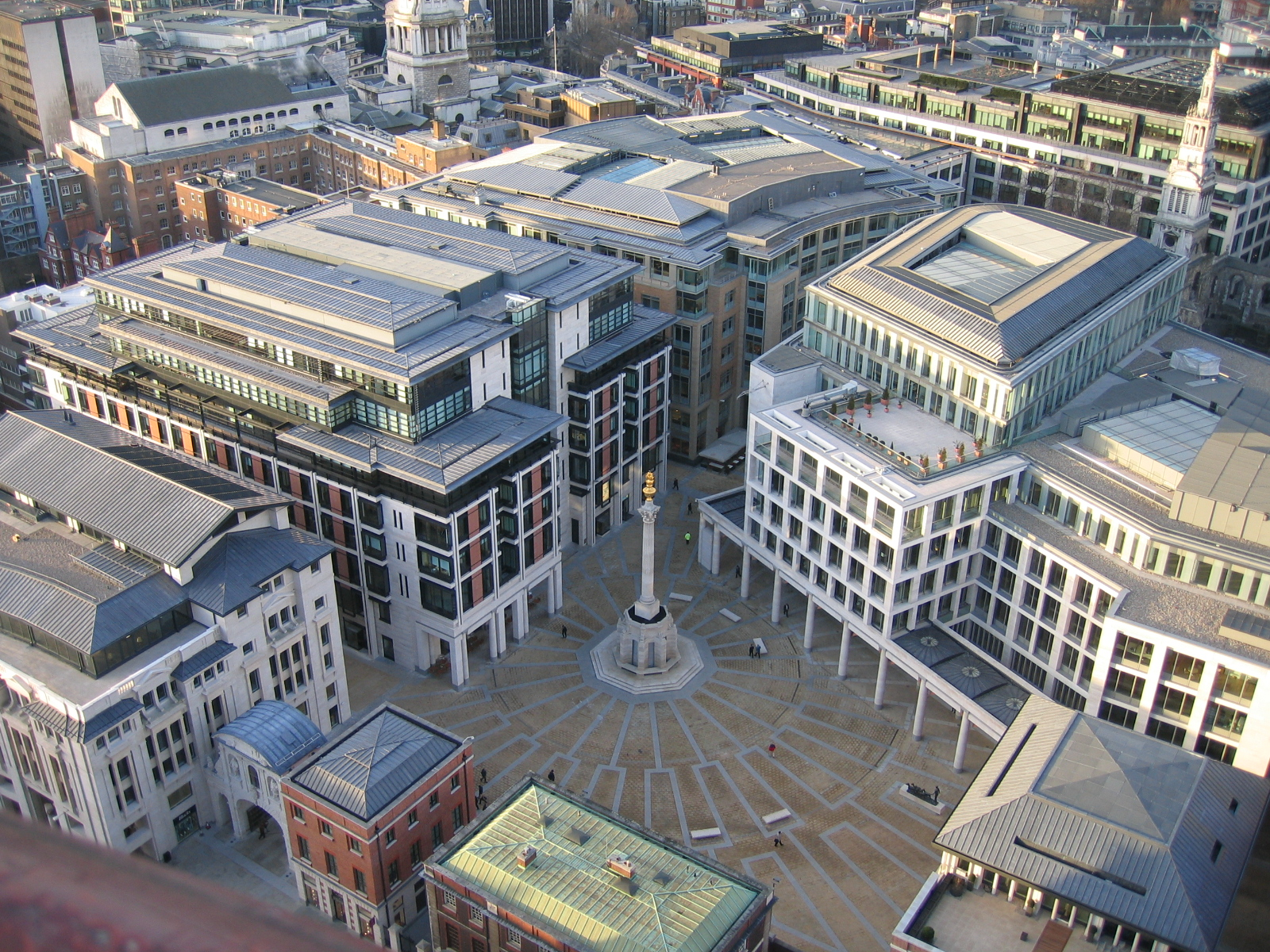
- Paternoster Square is located within Bread Street Ward.

- Location within Greater London
- Bread Street ward boundaries since 2013
- OS grid reference: TQ319812
- Sui generis: City of London
- Administrative area: Greater London
- Region: London
- Country: England
- Sovereign state: United Kingdom
- Post town: LONDON
- Postcode district: EC4
- Dialling code: 020
- Police: City of London
- Fire: London
- Ambulance: London
- UK Parliament: Cities of London and Westminster
- London Assembly: City and East

Bread Street is one of the 25 wards of the City of London, with the City forming the historic and financial centre of Greater London, England. The name derives from its principal street, which was anciently the city's bread market; already named Bredstrate (to at least 1180) for by the records it appears as that in 1302, Edward I announced that "the bakers of Bromley and Stratford-le-Bow [London], and ones already living on the street, were forbidden from selling bread from their own homes or bakeries, and could only do so from Bread Street." The street itself is just under 500 ft (153 m) in length and now forms the eastern boundary of the ward after the 2003 boundary changes.

The modern ward extends much further west from Bread Street itself and includes Paternoster Square, a modern development to the north of St Paul's Cathedral and home of the London Stock Exchange since 2004. The city's major shopping centre which opened in 2010 is at One New Change within Bread Street Ward.

== Boundaries ==
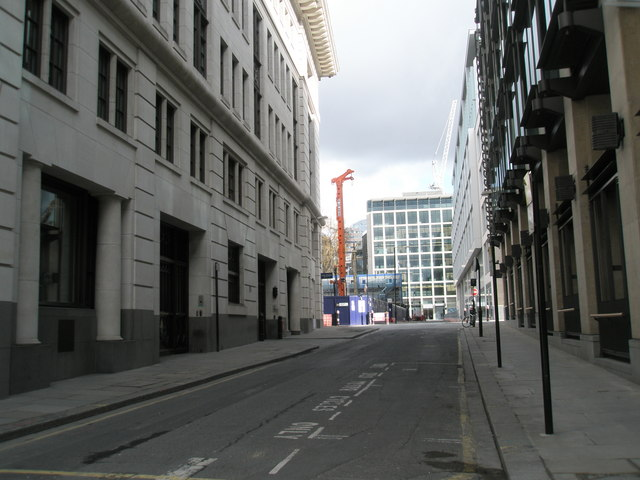
Southern end of Bread Street

As with most of the city's 25 wards, the boundaries of Bread Street were altered quite considerably in 2003, having remained almost unchanged for centuries. The ward is now bounded on its north by Cheap Ward; to the east by Cordwainer Ward; to the south by Queenhithe and Vintry Wards; and to the west by Castle Baynard and Farringdon Within Wards. Its geographical boundaries are Bread Street in the east; Newgate Street and Cheapside in the north; Warwick Lane and Ave Maria Lane in the west; and Queen Victoria Street to the south.

St Paul's Cathedral is outside the ward boundaries, being in Castle Baynard Ward, but St Paul's Cathedral School, situated between the cathedral and New Change is within the ward.

== Livery companies and parish churches ==
Five successive Livery Halls of the Worshipful Company of Cordwainers (workers in fine leather) stood in the ward. They are commemorated by a blue plaque in the gardens of St Paul's facing Cannon Street. The fifth and last hall was built between 1909 and 1910, but on the night of 10 May 1941 was gutted during the Blitz.

There were once two churches in the ward, All Hallows Bread Street and St Mildred, Bread Street, both to the design of Christopher Wren. Today their former parishes comprise part of St Mary-le-Bow on Cheapside. All Hallows was demolished in 1876 to make way for warehouses, and St Mildred was destroyed during The Blitz in April and May 1941.

== Politics ==
Bread Street is one of 25 wards in the City of London, each electing one Alderman and a number of Common Councillors (equivalent to Councillor) on the Court of Common Council of the City of London Corporation. Only Freemen of the City are eligible to stand for election to the Court of Aldermen, and for the Common Council a candidate must be a Freeman and also an elector, a resident, or an owner of freehold or leasehold land within the City of London.

As of May 2024, the elected members for Bread Street include Alderman Sir William Russell, Deputy Dr Giles Shilson and the Hon Emily Benn.

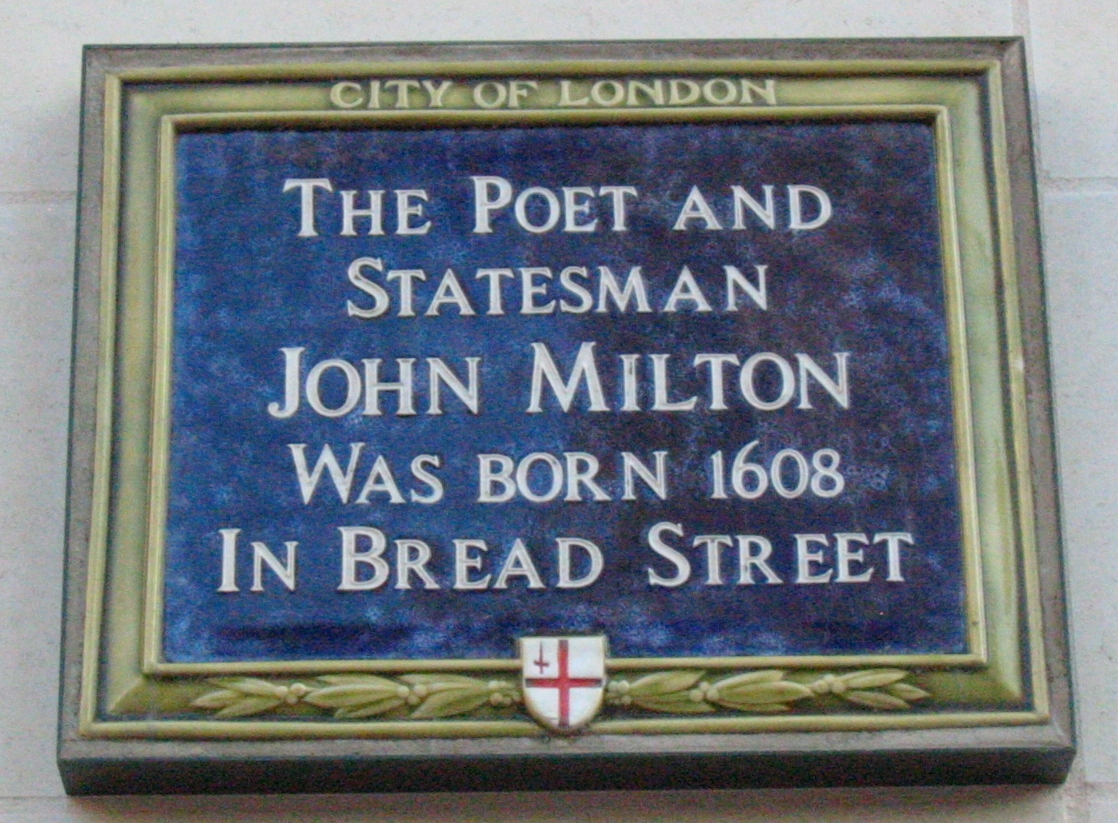
John Milton's blue plaque.

== Notable residents ==
Admiral Arthur Phillip, Commander of the First Fleet and first Governor of New South Wales, was baptised at All Hallows' Bread Street in 1738; he joined the Royal Navy in 1755 and died on 31 August 1814 and is remembered on Australia Day. A bust of Admiral Phillip can be seen in the church gardens on Watling Street.

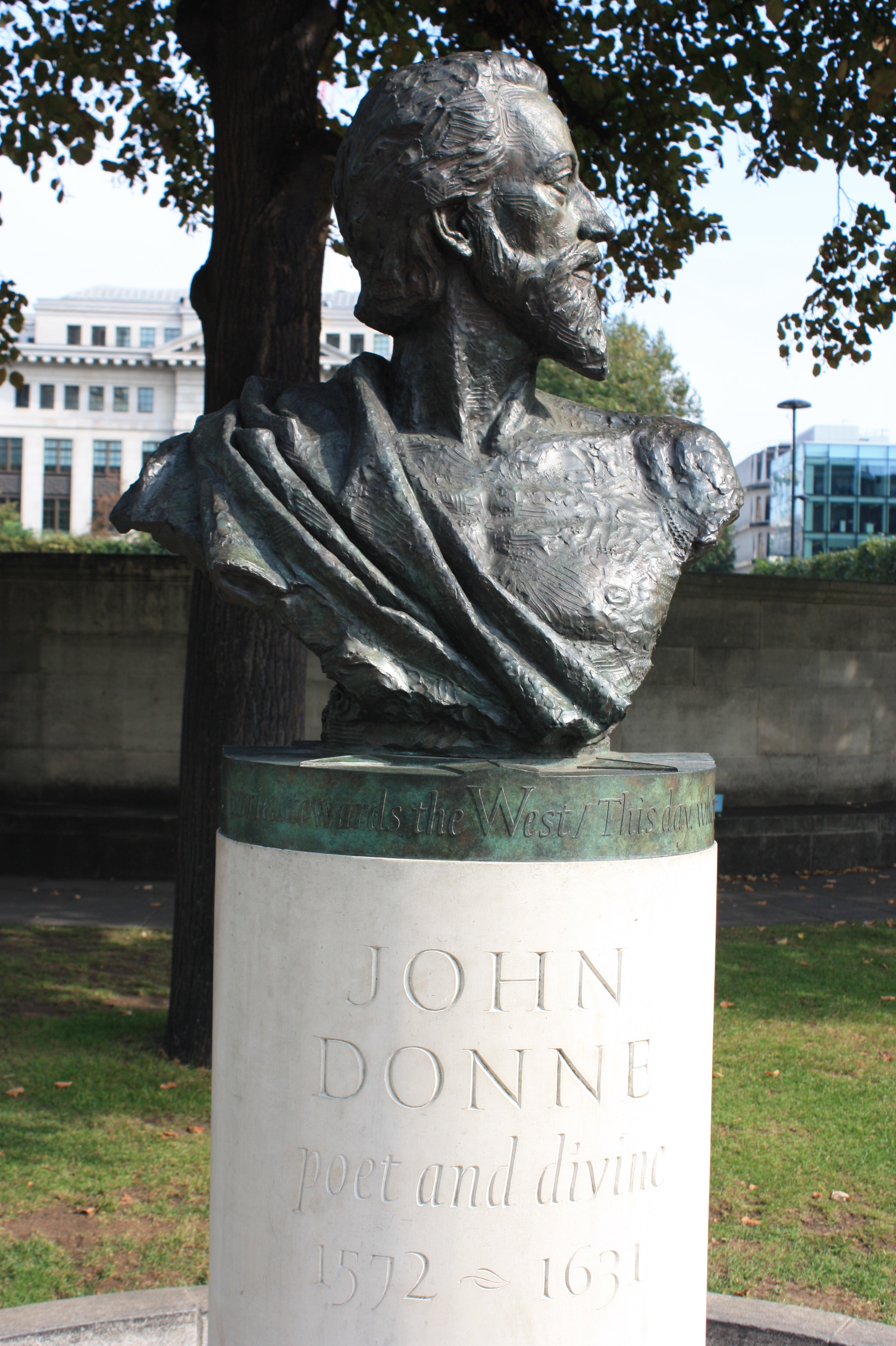
John Donne Memorial

Lord Mayor John Ansley was elected Alderman for Bread Street in 1800.

Bread Street is the birthplace of the poets John Donne and John Milton, both of whom are commemorated within Bread Street Ward.
