= Court of Common Council =

Decision-making body of the City of London Corporation

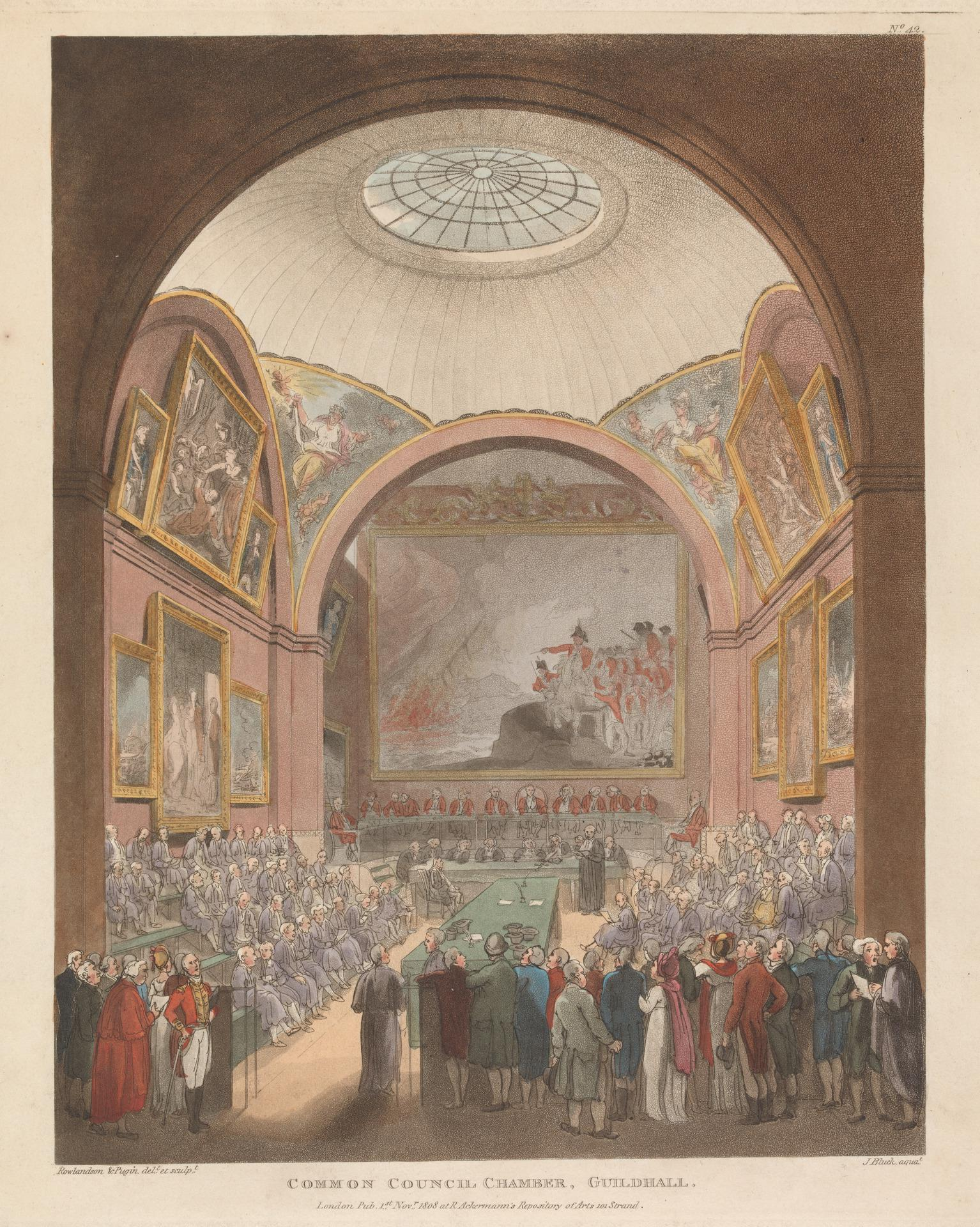
The Common Council Chamber at the Guildhall, pictured in 1808

The Court of Common Council is the primary decision-making body of the City of London Corporation. It meets nine times per year. Most of its work is carried out by committees. Elections are held at least every four years. It is largely composed of independent members, although in 2017 the number of Labour Party Common Councilmen grew to five out of a total of 100. In October 2018, the Labour Party gained its sixth seat on the Common Council with a by-election victory in Castle Baynard ward. The most recent election was in 2025.

== History ==
The first common council was elected in 1273, with 40 members. In 1347 the number was increased to 133, and from later in the same century (it is stated to have been during the reign of King Edward III) it was increased to 206. The members were elected annually in December.

The council is now made up of 100 common councillors and 25 aldermen.

Common councilmen are elected every fourth year. Between 2004 and 2009 elections were held on the second Friday in March. Since 2013 they have been held on either the third or fourth Wednesday in March.

== Court of Common Council elected in March 2022 or subsequently in by-elections ==
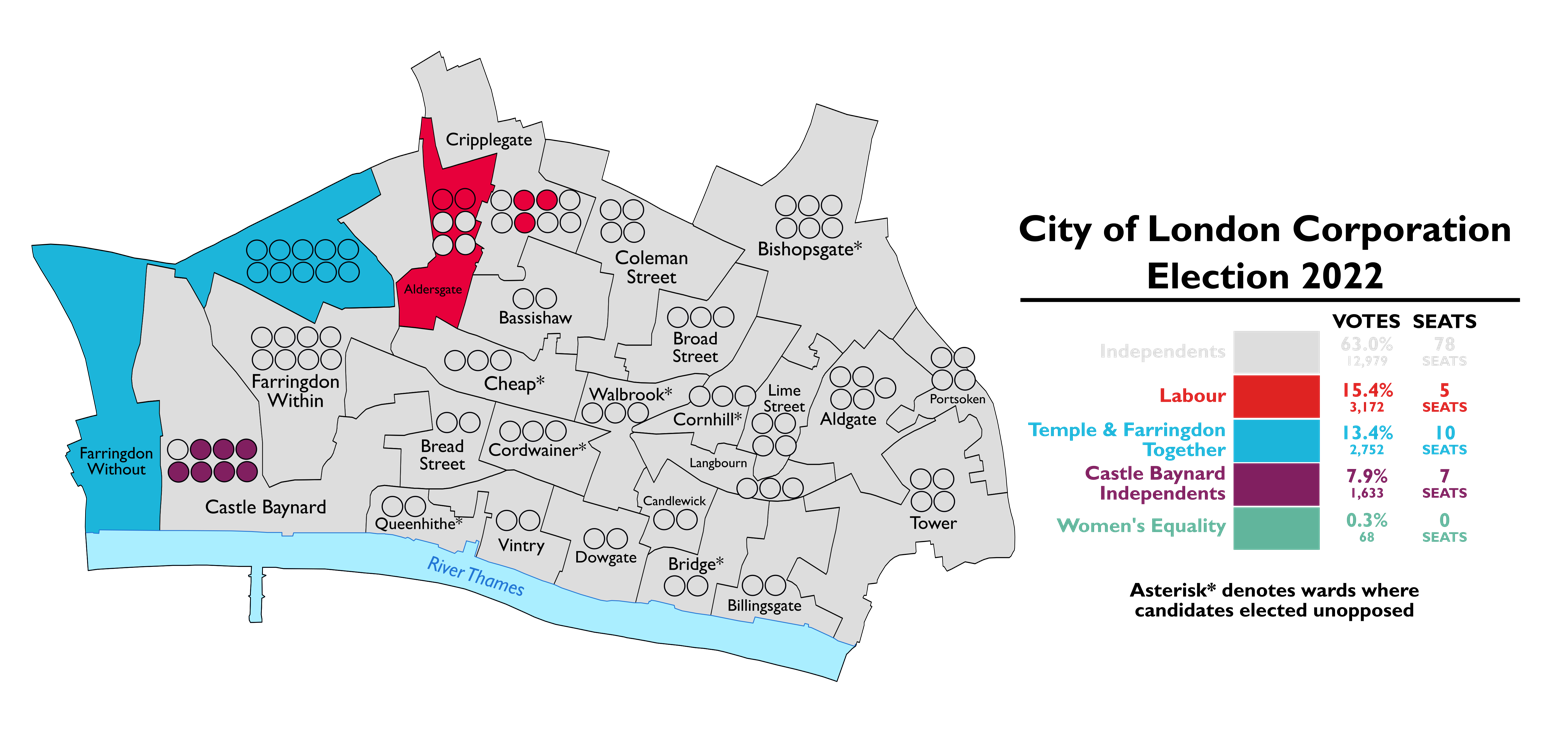
Map of the results of the City of London Corporation election, 2022. Each ward has several circles, each representing an elected councillor. Circles are coloured by party affiliation of those elected, and the vote share which these poll-toppers received. Results of subsequent by-elections are not shown.

| Ward | Councillors elected | Party |
|---|---|---|
| Aldersgate (6) | Helen Fentimen OBE JP | Labour |
| Aldersgate (6) | Stephen Goodman OBE | Labour |
| Aldersgate (6) | Annet Rideg | Ind. |
| Aldersgate (6) | Naresh Sonpar | Ind. |
| Aldersgate (6) | Deborah Oliver TD | Ind. |
| Aldersgate (6) | Randall Anderson | Ind. |
| Aldgate (5) | Andrien Meyers | Ind. |
| Aldgate (5) | Timothy McNally | Ind. |
| Aldgate (5) | David Sales | Ind. |
| Aldgate (5) | Mandeep Thandi | Ind. |
| Aldgate (5) | Shailendra Umradia | Ind. |
| Bassishaw (2) | Madush Gupta | Ind. |
| Bassishaw (2) | Ian Bishop-Laggett | Ind. |
| Billingsgate (2) | Luis Tilleria | Ind. |
| Billingsgate (2) | Nighat Qureishi | Ind. |
| Bishopsgate (6) | Simon Duckworth OBE DL | Ind. |
| Bishopsgate (6) | Wendy Hyde | Ind. |
| Bishopsgate (6) | Shravan Joshi MBE | Ind. |
| Bishopsgate (6) | Andrew Mayer | Ind. |
| Bishopsgate (6) | Benjamin Murphy | Ind. |
| Bishopsgate (6) | Tom Sleigh | Ind. |
| Bread Street (2) | Hon. Emily Benn | Ind. |
| Bread Street (2) | Dr Giles Shilson | Ind. |
| Bridge (2) | Keith Bottomley | Ind. |
| Bridge (2) | Hugh Selka | Ind. |
| Broad Street (3) | Christopher Hayward | Ind. |
| Broad Street (3) | Shahnan Bakth | Ind. |
| Broad Street (3) | Antony Manchester | Ind. |
| Candlewick (2) | James St John Davis | Ind. |
| Candlewick (2) | Christopher Boden | Ind. |
| Castle Baynard (8) | Henrika Priest | Ind. |
| Castle Baynard (8) | Mary Durcan JP | Ind. |
| Castle Baynard (8) | Alpa Raja | Ind. |
| Castle Baynard (8) | Graham Packham | Ind. |
| Castle Baynard (8) | Catherine McGuinness CBE | Ind. |
| Castle Baynard (8) | John Griffiths | Ind. |
| Castle Baynard (8) | Glen Witney | Ind. |
| Castle Baynard (8) | Michael Hudson | Ind. |
| Cheap (3) | Tijs Broeke | Ind. |
| Cheap (3) | Nicholas Bensted-Smith JP | Ind. |
| Cheap (3) | Alastair Moss | Ind. |
| Coleman Street (4) | Sophie Fernandes | Ind. |
| Coleman Street (4) | Dawn Wright | Ind. |
| Coleman Street (4) | Andrew McMurtrie JP | Ind. |
| Coleman Street (4) | Michael Cassidy CBE | Ind. |
| Cordwainer (3) | Jamel Banda | Ind. |
| Cordwainer (3) | Michael Snyder | Ind. |
| Cordwainer (3) | Amy Horscroft | Ind. |
| Cornhill (3) | Joanna Abeyie MBE | Ind. |
| Cornhill (3) | Peter Dunphy | Ind. |
| Cornhill (3) | Ian Seaton MBE | Ind. |
| Cripplegate (8) | Natasha Lloyd-Owen | Labour |
| Cripplegate (8) | Anne Corbett | Labour |
| Cripplegate (8) | Elizabeth King BEM JP | Ind. |
| Cripplegate (8) | Frances Leach | Labour |
| Cripplegate (8) | Paul Singh | Ind. |
| Cripplegate (8) | Ceri Wilkins | Ind. |
| Cripplegate (8) | Dawn Frampton | Ind. |
| Cripplegate (8) | Jacqueline Webster | Labour |
| Dowgate (2) | Henry Pollard | Ind. |
| Dowgate (2) | Mark Wheatley | Ind. |
| Farringdon Within (8) | John Edwards | Ind. |
| Farringdon Within (8) | Ann Holmes | Ind. |
| Farringdon Within (8) | Brendan Barns | Ind. |
| Farringdon Within (8) | Matthew Bell | Ind. |
| Farringdon Within (8) | John Foley | Ind. |
| Farringdon Within (8) | Eamonn Mullally | Ind. |
| Farringdon Within (8) | Florence Keelson-Anfu | Ind. |
| Farringdon Within (8) | David Williams | Ind. |
| Farringdon Without (10) | John Absalom | Temple and Farringdon Together |
| Farringdon Without (10) | George Abrahams | Temple and Farringdon Together |
| Farringdon Without (10) | Gregory Lawrence | Temple and Farringdon Together |
| Farringdon Without (10) | Edward Lord OBE JP | Temple and Farringdon Together |
| Farringdon Without (10) | Paul Martinelli | Temple and Farringdon Together |
| Farringdon Without (10) | Wendy Mead OBE | Temple and Farringdon Together |
| Farringdon Without (10) | Ruby Sayed | Temple and Farringdon Together |
| Farringdon Without (10) | Oliver Sells KC | Temple and Farringdon Together |
| Farringdon Without (10) | William Upton KC | Temple and Farringdon Together |
| Farringdon Without (10) | Suzanne Ornsby KC | Temple and Farringdon Together |
| Langbourn (3) | Judith Pleasance | Ind. |
| Langbourn (3) | Timothy Butcher | Ind. |
| Langbourn (3) | Philip Woodhouse | Ind. |
| Lime Street (4) | Dominic Christian | Ind. |
| Lime Street (4) | Irem Yerdelen | Ind. |
| Lime Street (4) | Henry Colthurst | Ind. |
| Lime Street (4) | Anthony Fitzpatrick | Ind. |
| Portsoken (4) | John Fletcher | Ind. |
| Portsoken (4) | Munsur Ali | Ind. |
| Portsoken (4) | Jason Pritchard | Ind. |
| Portsoken (4) | Henry Jones MBE | Ind. |
| Queenhithe (2) | Brian Mooney BEM | Ind. |
| Queenhithe (2) | Caroline Haines | Ind. |
| Tower (4) | Marianne Fredericks | Ind. |
| Tower (4) | James Tumbridge | Ind. |
| Tower (4) | Aaron D'Souza | Ind. |
| Tower (4) | Jason Groves | Ind. |
| Vintry (2) | Rehana Ameer | Ind. |
| Vintry (2) | Jaspreet Hodgson | Ind. |
| Walbrook (2) | James Thomson | Ind. |
| Walbrook (2) | Alethea Silk | Ind. |
