= Dowgate =

Ward of the City of London

Coordinates: 51.511°N 0.089°W

- Ward
- Location within Greater London
- Dowgate ward boundaries since 2013
- OS grid reference: TQ319812
- Sui generis: City of London
- Administrative area: Greater London
- Region: London
- Country: England
- Sovereign state: United Kingdom
- Post town: LONDON
- Postcode district: EC4
- Dialling code: 020
- Police: City of London
- Fire: London
- Ambulance: London
- UK Parliament: Cities of London and Westminster
- London Assembly: City and East

Dowgate, also referred to as Downgate and Downegate, is a small ward in the City of London, the historic and financial centre of London, England. The ward is bounded to the east by Swan Lane and Laurence Poutney Lane, to the south by the River Thames, to the west by Cousin Lane and College Hill, and to the north by Cannon Street. It is where the "lost" Walbrook watercourse emptied into the Thames.

A number of City livery companies are quartered in the ward: the Worshipful Company of Dyers, Worshipful Company of Innholders, Worshipful Company of Skinners and Worshipful Company of Tallow Chandlers. There is one church, St. Michael Paternoster, (Note: Described by John Betjeman as A round colonnaded temple with round urns on it, a middle stage with curving corbels, more urns, round turret supporting a vane.) where, in addition to its local and congregational causes, the Anglican Mission to Seafarers convenes and fundraises. The ward also contains Cannon Street station, which is on the site of the Steelyard (a mediaeval trading port of the Hanseatic League), and Dowgate Fire Station on Upper Thames Street, the only London Fire Brigade station within the City of London.

== Politics ==
Dowgate is one of the 25 wards of the City of London, each electing an alderman to the Court of Aldermen and commoners (the City equivalent of a councillor) to the Court of Common Council of the City of London Corporation. Only electors who are Freemen of the City of London are eligible to stand.

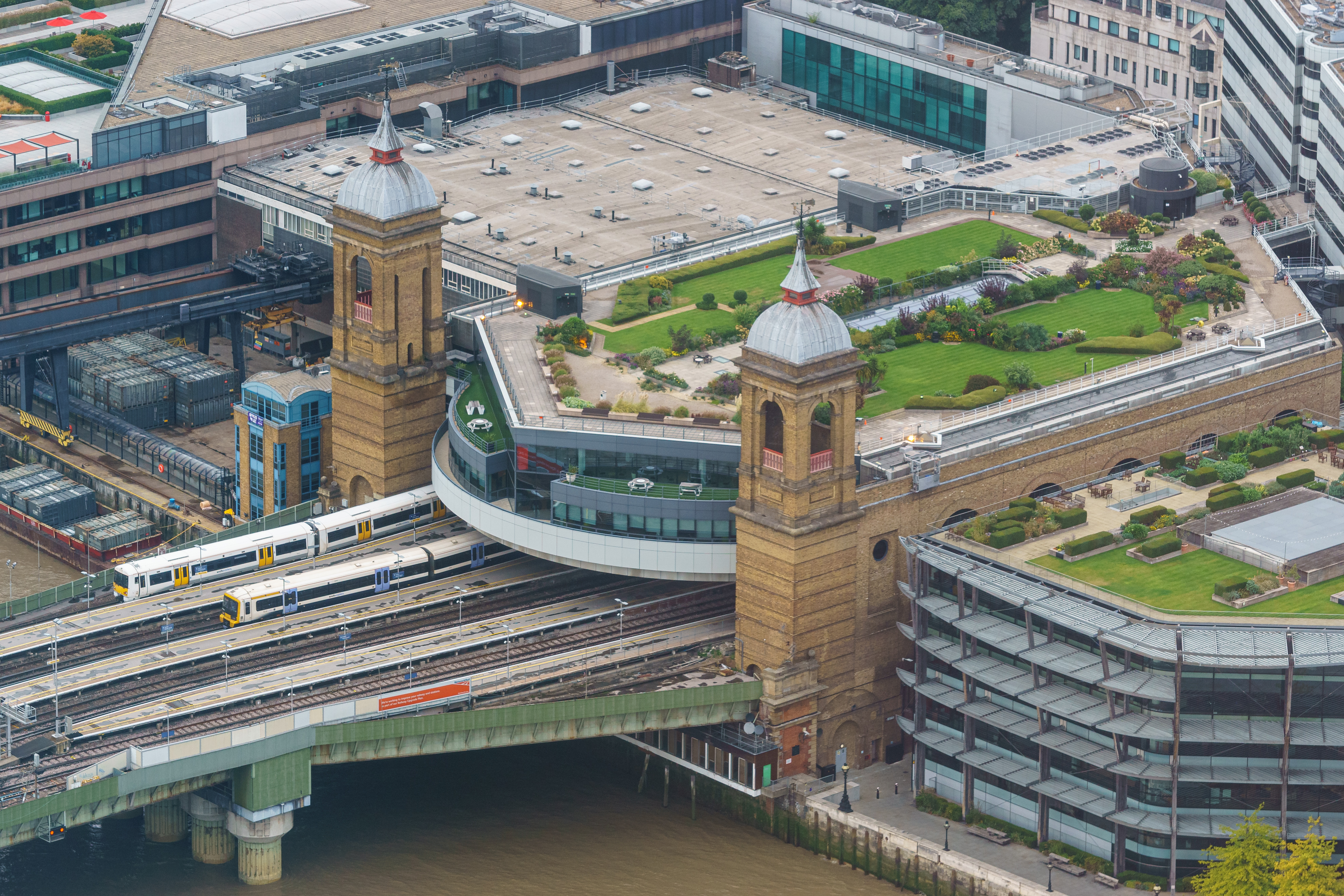
Cannon Street station, on the River Thames

== Bibliography ==
- Betjeman, J, The City of London Churches, Andover, Pitkin, 1972 ISBN 0-85372-112-2
