= Walbrook =

Ward of the City of London

Coordinates: 51.51240°N 0.09°W

- Ward
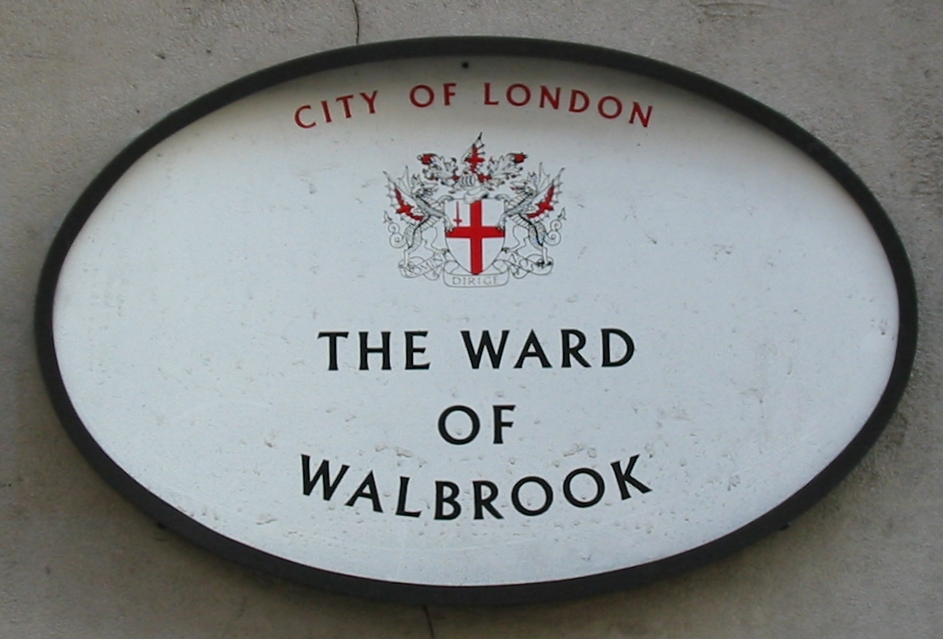
- Ward of Walbrook sign

- Location within Greater London
- Walbrook ward boundaries since 2013
- OS grid reference: TQ325810
- Sui generis: City of London
- Administrative area: Greater London
- Region: London
- Country: England
- Sovereign state: United Kingdom
- Post town: LONDON
- Postcode district: EC4
- Dialling code: 020
- Police: City of London
- Fire: London
- Ambulance: London
- UK Parliament: Cities of London and Westminster
- London Assembly: City and East

Walbrook is a Ward of the City of London and a minor street in its vicinity. The ward is named after a river of the same name.

The ward of Walbrook contains two of the city's most notable landmarks: the Bank of England and the Mansion House. The street runs between Cannon Street and Bank junction, though vehicular traffic can only access it via Bucklersbury, a nearby side-road off Queen Victoria Street.

== City ward ==
Location within the city (2003–2013 boundaries)

A street called Walbrook runs along the lower part of the brook's course. A valley is clearly visible; this can be seen most clearly at the junction of Walbrook and Cannon Street. On the street is the church of St Stephen Walbrook, which originally stood on the west bank of the stream, but was rebuilt around 1439 on the east side. In 1666 the church was destroyed in the Great Fire of London; Christopher Wren built a new church there in 1672, which still stands, to replace it. The Bank of England and the Mansion House, the official residence of the Lord Mayor, are both situated in Walbrook ward, as is the historic London Stone (the latter situated on Cannon Street). Within the ward is also the Walbrook Club, a private dining club founded in 2000; this was designed by Mark Birley of Annabel's, and is set in a Queen Anne-style townhouse.

Walbrook is one of 25 wards in the City of London, each electing an Alderman and Commoners (the City equivalent of a Councillor) to the Court of Common Council of the City of London Corporation. Only electors who are Freemen of the City of London are eligible to stand.

== Politics ==
The ward is represented in the City of London Corporation by John Garbutt Alderman and the Common Councilmen James Thomson (Deputy) and Peter Bennett.

== See also ==
- Roman sites in the United Kingdom
- Tributaries of the River Thames
- Subterranean rivers of London
- List of rivers in England
