= William Taylor =

William Taylor may refer to:

== Military ==
- William Taylor (Royal Navy officer, born 1760) (1760–1842), British naval officer
- William Rogers Taylor (1811–1889), U.S. rear admiral
- William G. Taylor (1829–1910), American sailor and Medal of Honor recipient
- William Taylor (Alamo defender) (fl. 1836), fatality at the Battle of the Alamo
- William Taylor (Medal of Honor) (1836–1902), Union Army soldier and officer during the American Civil War
- William Taylor (Royal Navy officer, born 1908) (1908–1999), British recipient of the George Cross
- William D. Taylor (general), US Army general
- Bill Taylor (naval officer) (William Leonard Taylor, born 1938), Australian naval officer and politician

== Political figures ==
=== Australia ===
- William Taylor (New South Wales politician, born 1862) (1862–1922), member of the New South Wales Legislative Assembly
- William Taylor (Tasmanian politician) (1894–1964), member of the Tasmanian Parliament
- William Taylor (Victorian politician) (1818–1903), pastoralist and member of the Victorian Legislative Council
- William Frederick Taylor (1840–1927), medical doctor and member of the Queensland Legislative Council
- William Tydd Taylor (1814–1862), member of the New South Wales Legislative Assembly

=== Canada ===
- William Benajah Taylor (1794–c. 1853), Canadian merchant and politician in Nova Scotia
- William Henry Taylor (politician) (1848–1916), Canadian politician in the Legislative Assembly of Ontario
- William Horace Taylor (1889–1986), Canadian politician
- William Taylor (New Brunswick politician) (c. 1789–1834), Canadian businessman and political figure in New Brunswick

=== New Zealand ===
- William Waring Taylor (1819–1903), politician

=== United Kingdom ===
- William Thomas Taylor (1848–1931), British colonial administrator
- W. B. Taylor (William Benjamin Taylor, 1875–1932), British member of parliament
- Sir William Taylor, 1st Baronet (1902–1972), British Conservative member of parliament
- William Campbell-Taylor (born 1965), pen name William Taylor, Anglican priest, writer and councillor
- Sir William Taylor (civil servant) (1882–1969), British civil servant and forester

=== United States ===
- William Taylor (New York politician) (1791–1865), U.S. congressman from New York
- William L. Taylor (1931–2010), attorney and civil rights activist who served on the US Commission on Civil Rights
- William P. Taylor (1791–1863), U.S. congressman from Virginia
- William Robert Taylor (1820–1909), governor of Wisconsin
- William S. Taylor (American politician, born 1795) (1795–1858), member of the Alabama, Mississippi, and Texas state legislatures, speaker of the Texas House of Representatives
- William S. Taylor (Kentucky politician) (1853–1928), Kentucky attorney general and governor; indicted for conspiracy to assassinate the succeeding governor
- William Taylor (Virginia politician, born 1788) (1788–1846), congressman and lawyer from Virginia
- William B. Taylor Jr. (born 1947), ambassador to Ukraine from 2006 to 2009, and chargé d'affaires 2019–2020
- Bill Taylor (Florida politician) (William J. Taylor, 1932–2018), American politician from Florida
- William L. Taylor (Indiana politician) (1850–1940), American lawyer and politician

== Religious figures ==
- William Taylor (Lollard) (died 1423), English priest and theologian, burnt as a Lollard
- William Taylor (Scottish minister) (1744–1823), Scottish minister, moderator and principal
- William Taylor (moderator) (1748–1825), minister of the Church of Scotland
- William Taylor (missionary) (1821–1902), American missionary and bishop of the Methodist Episcopal Church
- William Mackergo Taylor (1829–1895), U.S. Congregational minister
- William W. Taylor (1853–1884), American leader in The Church of Jesus Christ of Latter-day Saints
- William Taylor (Archdeacon of Liverpool) (1820–1906), archdeacon in the Diocese of Liverpool
- William Taylor (Dean of Portsmouth) (1956–2026), Anglican priest
- William Carey Taylor (1886–1971), English Baptist minister and missionary

== Scientists and engineers ==
- William B. Taylor (engineer) (1824–1895), American civil engineer and surveyor in New York
- William Taylor (inventor) (1865–1937), British inventor
- William C. Taylor (materials scientist) (1886–1958) of Howard N. Potts Medal
- William Taylor (ophthalmologist) (1912–1989), British ophthalmologist and expert on albinism
- William Randolph Taylor (1895–1990), American botanist
- William R. Taylor, psychiatrist; see Fuzzy cognitive map

== Sportspeople ==
=== American football ===
- William S. Taylor (American football) (fl. 1928–1940), head football coach at University of Arkansas-Pine Bluff 1937–1940
- Willie Taylor (Canadian football) (1936–2022), American player of Canadian football
- Willie Taylor (American football) (born 1955), American NFL football wide receiver
- Billy Taylor (American football coach) (William Taylor, born 1964), American college football coach
- Billy Taylor (running back, born 1949) (William Lewis Taylor, born 1949), American and Canadian football running back

=== Cricket ===
- William Taylor (Surrey cricketer) (1821–1878), English cricketer
- Will Taylor (Derbyshire cricketer) (William Thomas Taylor, 1885–1976), English cricketer
- William Taylor (Worcestershire cricketer) (1885–1959), English cricketer
- Bill Taylor (cricketer, born 1947) (William Taylor), English cricketer

=== Other sports ===
- William Taylor (jockey, born 1819), rode in 1846 Grand National
- William Taylor (jockey, died 1950), rode in 1898 Grand National
- W. F. Taylor (William Franklin Taylor, 1877–1945), Canadian ice hockey administrator, founding president of the Canadian Amateur Hockey Association
- William "Lady" Taylor (1880–1942), Canadian ice hockey player
- Bill Taylor (footballer, born 1886) (William Taylor, 1886–1966), English footballer
- William Taylor (cyclist) (1899–1976), Canadian Olympic cyclist
- Willie Taylor (footballer) (c. 1870–1949), Scottish footballer
- Willie Taylor (basketball) (1946–2026), American basketball player
- William Taylor (tennis) (1860–?), English tennis player, two time Wimbledon semifinalist
- William Taylor (marathon runner) (1870–?), British track and field athlete
- William Taylor (long jumper), winner of the standing long jump and standing high jump at the 1919 USA Indoor Track and Field Championships
- William Taylor (1869–1920), American tennis player, five-time winner of Pacific Coast Championships
- Bill Taylor (Australian footballer) (William Taylor, 1902–1978), Australian rules footballer
- Bill Taylor (baseball) (William Michael Taylor, 1929–2011), American baseball player
- Bill Taylor (footballer, born 1869) (William Taylor, 1869–?), English footballer
- Bill Taylor (footballer, born 1886) (William Taylor, 1886–1966), English footballer
- Billy Taylor (1880s pitcher) (William Henry Taylor, 1855–1900), American baseball player
- Billy Taylor (1990s pitcher) (William Howell Taylor, born 1961), American baseball player
- Billy Taylor (boxer) (William Taylor, 1952–2022), British boxer
- Billy Taylor (footballer, born 1896) (William Taylor, 1896–1986), English football and cricket player
- Billy Taylor (footballer, born 1898) (William Taylor, 1898–1965), English footballer
- Billy Taylor (footballer, born 1939) (William Taylor, 1939–1981), Scottish footballer
- Billy Taylor (ice hockey, born 1919) (William James Taylor, 1919–1990), Canadian ice hockey player
- Billy Taylor (ice hockey, born 1942) (William Gordon Taylor, 1942–1979), Canadian ice hockey centre
- Billy Taylor (third baseman) (William H. Taylor, 1870–1905), Major League Baseball player
- Will Taylor (baseball) (William Edward Taylor, born 2003), American baseball outfielder
- Will Taylor (rugby union) (William Rhys Taylor, born 1991), Welsh rugby union player

== Writers, publishers, illustrators ==
- William Taylor (bookseller) (fl. 1708–1724), bookseller trading at St. Paul's Churchyard, London, and publisher of Daniel Defoe's Robinson Crusoe in 1719
- William Taylor (historian) (1922–2014), U.S. historian, professor, and author
- William Taylor (man of letters) (1765–1836), English scholar and linguist
- William Taylor (writer) (1938–2015), New Zealand children's writer
- William B. Taylor (historian) (fl. 1965–2007), American historian
- William Cooke Taylor (1800–1849), Irish writer
- William Davis Taylor (1908–2002), American newspaper publisher, The Boston Globe
- William Ladd Taylor (1854–1926), American illustrator
- William O. Taylor (1871–1955), American newspaper publisher, The Boston Globe
- William O. Taylor II (1932–2011), American newspaper publisher, The Boston Globe
- William Benjamin Sarsfield Taylor (1781–1850), Irish artist and writer
- Bill Taylor (businessman) (William C. Taylor), co-founder and editor of Fast Company magazine

== Legal professionals ==
- William Taylor (lawyer) (fl. 1971–2005), British lawyer who was lead counsel for Abdelbaset al-Megrahi at the Lockerbie trial
- William Taylor (police officer) (born 1947), British police officer
- William A. Taylor (1928–2010), justice of the Wyoming Supreme Court
- William H. Taylor (judge) (1863–1926), justice of the Vermont Supreme Court
- William M. Taylor (1876–1959), justice of the Supreme Court of Texas
- William McLaughlin Taylor Jr. (1909–1985), U.S. federal judge
- William Taylor (judge) (1944–2025), English senior circuit judge
- William L. Taylor (1931–2010), Jewish-American attorney, lobbyist and activist

== Others ==
- William Taylor (headmaster) (1840–1910), British teacher, headmaster of Sir Walter St John's Grammar School For Boys
- William Desmond Taylor (1872–1922), U.S. film director
- William Henry Taylor (1906–1965), alleged Soviet agent
- William Taylor, video game designer, see Blazing Angels 2
- "William Taylor" (folk song), a British folk song
- William Taylor (cotton manufacturer) (died 1852), cotton manufacturer in Lancashire, England
- William Taylor (academic) (1930–2005), English educationalist, vice-chancellor of the University of Hull
- William Taylor (Master of Christ's College, Cambridge) (16th century), academic
- William Joseph Taylor (1802–1885), British medallist and engraver
- Willie Taylor (singer) (born 1981), American singer and songwriter
- William Taylor (Nights: Journey of Dreams), video game character
- William Taylor & Son, an apartment building in Cleveland, US
- Billy Taylor (jazz bassist) (William Taylor Sr., 1906–1986), American jazz bassist
- Will Taylor (land speculator) (William Taylor, 1853–1941), founder of North Bend, Washington
- William Lee Taylor (1854–1915), American bank president, Baptist minister, teacher, and farmer

== See also ==
- Billy Taylor (disambiguation)
- William Tayler (1808–1892), British civil servant of the East India Company
- William Taylor House (disambiguation)
- Will Taylor (disambiguation)
- Willy Taylor (1916–2000), Northumbrian fiddler
- List of people with surname Taylor
