= Billy Taylor (disambiguation) =

Billy Taylor (1921–2010) was an American jazz pianist.

Billy Taylor or Bill Taylor may also refer to:

== Sport ==
=== American and Canadian football ===
- Billy Taylor (running back, born 1956), former American football running back for the New York Giants, New York Jets and Los Angeles Raiders
- Billy Taylor (running back, born 1949), former American and Canadian football running back for the Calgary Stampeders

=== Baseball ===
- Billy Taylor (1880s pitcher) (1855–1900), baseball pitcher
- Billy Taylor (third baseman) (1870–1905), baseball infielder
- Bill Taylor (baseball) (1929–2011), baseball outfielder
- Billy Taylor (1990s pitcher) (born 1961), baseball pitcher

=== Football (soccer) ===
- Bill Taylor (footballer, born 1869) (1869–?), English association footballer who played for Small Heath
- Bill Taylor (footballer, born 1886) (1886–1966), English association football player with Burnley and Oldham Athletic
- Bill Taylor (footballer, born 1938), Scottish association football player with St. Johnstone
- Billy Taylor (footballer and cricketer) (1896–1986), English footballer and cricketer
- Billy Taylor (footballer, born 1939) (1939–1981), Scottish association footballer who played for Leyton Orient, Nottingham Forest and Lincoln City
- Billy Taylor (footballer, born 1898) (1898–1965), English footballer

=== Ice hockey ===
- Billy Taylor (ice hockey, born 1919) (Billy "The Kid", 1919–1990), Canadian NHL player from 1939 to 1948
- Billy Taylor (ice hockey, born 1942) (1942–1979), Canadian NHL player for New York Rangers
- William "Lady" Taylor (1880–1942), Canadian player

=== Other sports ===
- Bill Taylor (alpine skier) (born 1956), former American alpine skier
- Bill Taylor (Australian footballer) (1902–1977), Australian rules footballer
- Billy Taylor (boxer) (1952–2022), British boxer
- Bill Taylor (cricketer, born 1947), English cricketer
- Billy Taylor (basketball) (born 1973), head coach of the Elon Phoenix men's basketball team
- Billy Taylor (cricketer, born 1977), English cricketer

== Other ==
- Sir Bill Taylor (aviator) (1896–1966), Australian pilot and author
- Billy Taylor (jazz bassist) (1906–1986), American jazz bassist
- Bill Taylor (English politician) (born 1952), English local politician and election agent to Jack Straw
- Bill Taylor (naval officer) (born 1938), Australian naval officer and politician
- Bill Taylor (businessman), American professor and business magazine editor
- Bill Taylor (Ohio politician), member of the Ohio House of Representatives, 1995–2000
- Bill Taylor (South Carolina politician) (born 1946), American politician
- Bill Taylor (visual effects artist) (1944–2021), American visual effects artist
- Corporal Bill Taylor, the last playable protagonist in Call of Duty 2
- William B. Taylor Jr. (born 1947), American diplomat

== See also ==
- William Taylor (disambiguation)
