= 2017 City of London Corporation election =

Elections in England

- 23 March 2017

100 seats to the Court of Common Council 51 seats needed for a majority

	First party	Second party	Third party
Party	Independent	Temple and Farringdon Together	Labour
Last election	100 seats, 80.4%	Did not stand	0 seats, 19.6%
Seats before	99	0	1
Seats won	85	10	5
Seat change	▼15	▲10	▲5
Popular vote	3,047	440	717
Percentage	72.5%	10.5%	17.1%
Swing	▼7.9%	New party	▼2.5%
- Results by ward. Red represents Labour. Blue represents Temple & Farringdon Together. Grey represents Independents. Wards coloured dark grey did not hold contests.
Council control before election
No overall control
Council control after election
No overall control

The 2017 City of London Corporation election took place on 23 March 2017 to elect members of the Court of Common Council in the City of London Corporation. The election was the first time apart from a 2014 by-election that partisan candidates were elected to the body. Fifteen of the hundred seats on the council were won by political parties: the newly created Temple & Farringdon Together party and the Labour Party.

The elections attracted media attention as they represented a high point in the City of London for Labour, who until the 2017 election had only ever won a single seat in a 2014 by-election for Portsoken ward.

26 councillors were elected unopposed: twenty-five independents and one Labour.

== Background ==
Elections to the Court of Common Council, the main decision-making body of the City of London Corporation which governs the City of London, take place every four years. In the previous election in 2013, all 100 seats were won by independent candidates.

In a 2014 by-election for the Portsoken ward, the Labour Party won its first seat on the council with the Anglican priest William Campbell-Taylor becoming the first partisan councillor to be elected to the body.

== Electoral system ==
Most residents of the twenty-five wards of the City of London live in the Aldersgate, Cripplegate, Portsoken and Queenhithe. Residents have one vote each, and businesses have a number of votes that scales with the number of employees. Businesses can appoint one employee as a voter for every five staff up to ten voters, with an additional voter per fifty staff beyond that.

Councillors are elected by multi-member first-past-the-post.

== Overall result ==
2017 City of London Corporation election
Party	Seats					Votes		
Party	Count	Gains	Losses	Net	Of total (%)	Of total (%)	Count	Change
Independent	85	0	15	−15	85.0	72.5	3,047	−7.9
Labour	5	5	0	+5	5.0	17.1	717	-2.5
Temple & Farringdon Together	10	10	0	+10	10.0	10.5	440	+10.5
Total	100							

== Ward results ==
Incumbent councillors are marked with an asterisk (*).

=== Aldersgate ===
Aldersgate (6 seats)
Party	Candidate	Votes	%	±%
Independent	Randall Anderson*	–	–	–
Independent	Adrian Bastow	–	–	–
Labour	Richard Crossan	–	–	–
Independent	Jeremy Mayhew*	–	–	–
Independent	Joyce Nash*	–	–	–
Independent	Barbara Newman*	–	–	–
Turnout		–	–	–
Independent hold				
Independent hold				
Labour hold				
Independent hold				
Independent hold				
Independent hold				

=== Aldgate ===
Aldgate (5 seats)
Party	Candidate	Votes	%	±%
Independent	Douglas Barrow*	–	–	–
No description	Andrien Meyers	–	–	–
Independent	Hugh Morris*	–	–	–
No description	Sylvia Moys*	–	–	–
No description	Dhruv Patel*	–	–	–
Turnout		–	–	–
Independent hold				
Independent hold				
Independent hold				
Independent hold				
Independent hold				

=== Bassishaw ===
Bassishaw (2 seats)
Party	Candidate	Votes	%	±%
Independent	Graeme Harrower*	–	–	–
Independent	Robert Merrett*	–	–	–
Turnout		–	–	–
Independent hold				
Independent hold				

=== Billingsgate ===
Billingsgate (2 seats)
Party	Candidate	Votes	%	±%
Independent	John Welbank*	42	43.3	N/A
Independent	Jamie Ingham Clark*	40	41.2	N/A
No description	Richard Briggs	15	15.5	N/A
Turnout		97	24.1	N/A
Independent hold				
Independent hold				

=== Bishopsgate ===
Bishopsgate (6 seats)
Party	Candidate	Votes	%	±%
Independent	Simon Duckworth*	–	–	–
Independent	Prem Goyal	–	–	–
Independent	Wendy Hyde*	–	–	–
Independent	Andrew Mayer	–	–	–
Independent	Tom Sleigh*	–	–	–
Independent	Pooja Tank	–	–	–
Turnout		–	–	–
Independent hold				
Independent hold				
Independent hold				
Independent hold				
Independent hold				
Independent hold				

=== Bread Street ===
Bread Street (2 seats)
Party	Candidate	Votes	%	±%
Independent	Giles Shilson*	136	40.1	▼9.4
Independent	Oliver Lodge*	126	37.2	▼10.7
Independent	Alison McDonald	46	13.5	N/A
Independent	Neil Green	31	9.1	N/A
Turnout		339	56.1	
Independent hold				
Independent hold				

=== Bridge and Bridge Without ===
Bridge and Bridge Without (2 seats)
Party	Candidate	Votes	%	±%
Independent	Keith Bottomley*	131	52.8	
Independent	Timothy Levene	96	38.7	
Independent	Simon Maddocks	21	8.5	
Turnout		248	46.7	
Independent gain from Independent				
Independent gain from Independent				

=== Broad Street ===
Broad Street (3 seats)
Party	Candidate	Votes	%	±%
Independent	John Bennett*	–	–	–
Independent	Christopher Hayward*	–	–	–
Independent	John Scott*	–	–	–
Turnout		–	–	–
Independent hold				
Independent hold				
Independent hold				

=== Candlewick ===
Candlewick (2 seats)
Party	Candidate	Votes	%	±%
Independent	Havilland de Sausmarez*	113	48.7	N/A
Independent	Kevin Everett*	104	44.8	–
Independent	Jonathon Pettigrew	15	6.5	N/A
Turnout		232	56.1	
Independent hold				
Independent hold				

=== Castle Baynard ===
Castle Baynard (8 seats)
Party	Candidate	Votes	%	±%
Independent	Emma Edhem	225	11.3	N/A
Independent	Henrika Priest*	225	11.3	▼1.7
Independent	Catherine McGuinness*	213	10.7	▼1.6
Independent	Graham Packham*	213	10.7	▼1.2
Independent	Jeremy Simons*	208	10.4	N/A
Independent	Angus Knowles-Cutler	200	10.0	N/A
Independent	Michael Hudson*	195	9.8	▼1.6
Independent	Christopher Boden*	187	9.4	▼2.6
Independent	Alpa Raja	119	6.0	N/A
Turnout		1,785	20.5	
Independent hold				
Independent hold				
Independent hold				
Independent hold				
Independent hold				
Independent hold				
Independent hold				
Independent hold				

=== Cheap ===
Cheap (3 seats)
Party	Candidate	Votes	%	±%
Independent	Alastair Moss*	178	28.6	▲8.3
Independent	Tijs Broeke	169	27.2	N/A
Independent	Nicholas Bensted-Smith*	168	27.0	N/A
Independent	Ann Pembroke*	107	17.2	▼4.8
Turnout		622	50.3	
Independent hold				
Independent hold				
Independent hold				

=== Coleman Street ===
Coleman Street (4 seats)
Party	Candidate	Votes	%	±%
Independent	Sophie Fernandes*	162	26.0	–
Independent	Stuart Fraser*	140	22.4	–
No description	Andrew McMurtrie*	137	22.0	–
Independent	Michael Cassidy*	133	21.3	–
Labour	Paul O'Brien	52	8.3	N/A
Turnout		624	30.9	
Independent hold				
Independent hold				
No description hold		Swing	{{{swing}}}	
Independent hold				

=== Cordwainer ===
Cordwainer (3 seats)
Party	Candidate	Votes	%	±%
Independent	Alex Barr	92	32.4	N/A
Independent	Michael Snyder*	79	27.8	–
Independent	Mark Boleat*	77	27.1	–
Independent	Gillian Kaile	21	7.4	N/A
No description	Timothy Becker	15	5.3	N/A
Turnout		284	58.3	
Independent hold				
Independent hold				
Independent hold				

=== Cornhill ===
Cornhill (3 seats)
Party	Candidate	Votes	%	±%
Independent	Peter Dunphy*	92	33.6	▲1.7
Independent	Stephen Haines*	85	31.0	▼0.1
Independent	Ian Seaton*	77	28.1	▼2.2
Labour	Joseph Batty	20	7.3	▲0.6
Turnout		274	29.2	
Independent hold				
Independent hold				
Independent hold				

=== Cripplegate ===
Cripplegate (8 seats)
Party	Candidate	Votes	%	±%
No description	Susan Pearson	558	13.6	N/A
Independent	John Tomlinson*	449	10.9	▼0.5
Labour	William Pimlott	409	10.0	▲2.3
Independent	Vivienne Littlechild*	407	9.9	▼0.5
Labour	Joan Durcan	401	9.8	N/A
Independent	David Bradshaw*	386	9.4	▼2.1
Independent	Steve Quilter*	375	9.1	▼2.6
Independent	Richard Bostock	323	7.9	N/A
Independent	Gareth Moore*	311	7.6	▼2.0
Independent	John Barker*	307	7.5	▼1.7
Independent	Christopher Punter*	181	4.4	▼5.4
Turnout		4,107	37.8	
Independent hold				
Independent hold				
Labour hold				
Independent hold				
Labour hold				
Independent hold				
Independent hold				
Independent hold				

=== Dowgate ===
Dowgate (2 seats)
Party	Candidate	Votes	%	±%
Independent	Mark Wheatley*	123	40.6	▲10.7
Independent	Henry Pollard*	112	37.0	▼2.0
Independent	Matthew Hampson	68	22.4	N/A
Turnout		303	30.3	
Independent hold				
Independent hold				

=== Farringdon Within ===
Farringdon Within (8 seats)
Party	Candidate	Votes	%	±%
Independent	Thomas Anderson	247	10.2	N/A
Independent	Christopher Hill	241	10.1	N/A
Independent	Ann Holmes*	226	9.4	▼0.3
Independent	Clare James*	213	8.8	▼3.1
Independent	Matthew Bell	190	7.9	N/A
Independent	Karina Dostalova*	184	7.6	▼2.7
Independent	Richard Regan*	160	6.6	▼4.0
Independent	Graeme Smith*	159	6.6	▼3.2
Independent	Virginia Rounding*	148	6.1	▼6.0
Independent	John Edwards	143	5.9	N/A
Independent	Colin Gregory	131	5.4	N/A
Independent	Alex Bain-Stewart*	107	4.4	▼6.5
Independent	Stephen Collins	100	4.1	N/A
Independent	Stanley Ginsburg	94	3.9	N/A
Independent	Robert McLean	71	2.9	N/A
Turnout		2,414	35.4	
Independent hold				
Independent hold				
Independent hold				
Independent hold				
Independent hold				
Independent hold				
Independent hold				
Independent hold				

=== Farringdon Without ===
Farringdon Without (10 seats)
Party	Candidate	Votes	%	±%
T&F Together	Caroline Addy	440	7.4	N/A
T&F Together	Ruby Sayed	427	7.2	N/A
T&F Together	Wendy Mead*	425	7.2	▲0.6
T&F Together	Oliver Sells	424	7.1	N/A
T&F Together	Paul Martinelli*	410	6.9	▲0.8
T&F Together	Gregory Lawrence	408	6.9	▲1.2
T&F Together	Charles Lord*	404	6.8	▲1.0
T&F Together	George Abrahams*	403	6.8	▲0.1
T&F Together	John Absalom*	400	6.7	▲0.4
T&F Together	James Upton	390	6.6	N/A
Independent	Julian Malins*	209	3.5	▼4.9
Independent	Colin Davidson	208	3.5	N/A
Independent	Sophia Morrell	190	3.2	N/A
Independent	David Nicholls	168	2.8	N/A
Independent	Alexander Deane*	167	2.8	▼5.5
Independent	Francis Hoar	164	2.8	N/A
Independent	Andrew Lomas	163	2.7	N/A
No description	Nicholas Bennett	149	2.5	N/A
Independent	Adam Richardson*	147	2.5	▼4.1
No description	Mark Watson-Gandy	144	2.4	N/A
Independent	Lewis Rodger	50	0.8	N/A
Independent	Stuart Gardner	42	0.7	N/A
Turnout		5,932	20.9	
T&F Together gain from Independent		Swing	–	
T&F Together gain from Independent		Swing	–	
T&F Together gain from Independent		Swing	–	
T&F Together gain from Independent		Swing	–	
T&F Together gain from Independent		Swing	–	
T&F Together gain from Independent		Swing	–	
T&F Together gain from Independent		Swing	–	
T&F Together gain from Independent		Swing	–	
T&F Together gain from Independent		Swing	–	
T&F Together gain from Independent		Swing	–	

=== Langbourn ===
Langbourn (3 seats)
Party	Candidate	Votes	%	±%
Independent	Philip Woodhouse*	95	27.0	▲5.5
Independent	Judith Pleasance*	82	23.3	▲8.6
Independent	John Chapman*	64	18.2	▲0.6
Independent	Timothy Butcher	57	16.2	N/A
Independent	Alexander Craggs	54	15.3	N/A
Turnout		352	42.4	
Independent hold				
Independent hold				
Independent hold				

=== Lime Street ===
Lime Street (4 seats)
Party	Candidate	Votes	%	±%
Independent	Dominic Christian*	154	28.3	N/A
Independent	Henry Colthurst*	115	21.1	▼1.4
Independent	Elizabeth Rogula*	115	21.1	▼2.4
Independent	Thomas Clementi	86	15.8	N/A
Independent	Peter Cave	75	13.8	N/A
Independent	George Johnstone	35	6.4	N/A
Turnout		545	49.0	
Independent gain from Independent				
Independent hold				
Independent hold				
Independent gain from Independent				

=== Portsoken ===
Portsoken (4 seats)
Party	Candidate	Votes	%	±%
Labour	Jason Pritchard	230	20.0	▲10.2
Labour	Munsur Ali	210	18.3	N/A
Independent	John Fletcher*	197	17.2	▼1.3
Independent	Henry Jones*	187	16.3	▼3.6
Independent	Ayesha Azad	153	13.3	N/A
Independent	Asif Sadiq	111	9.7	N/A
Independent	David Barker	60	5.2	N/A
Turnout		1,148	50.7	
Labour gain from Independent				
Labour gain from Independent				
Independent hold				
Independent hold				

=== Queenhithe ===
Queenhithe (2 seats)
Party	Candidate	Votes	%	±%
Independent	Brian Mooney*	85	51.8	▲4.6
Independent	Caroline Haines	73	44.5	▼0.3
Labour	John Courtneidge	6	3.7	▼3.7
Turnout		164	33.6	
Independent hold				
Independent gain from Independent				

=== Tower ===
Tower (4 seats)
Party	Candidate	Votes	%	±%
Independent	Roger Chadwick*	–	–	–
Independent	Anne Fairweather*	–	–	–
Independent	Marianne Fredericks*	–	–	–
Independent	James Tumbridge*	–	–	–
Turnout		–	–	
Independent hold				
Independent gain from Independent				
Independent hold				
Independent hold				

=== Vintry ===
Vintry (2 seats)
Party	Candidate	Votes	%	±%
Independent	Thomas Hoffman*	85	37.9	
Independent	Rehana Ameer	74	33.0	
Independent	William Fraser*	65	29.0	
Turnout		224	45.4	
Independent hold				
Independent gain from Independent				

=== Walbrook ===
Walbrook (2 seats)
Party	Candidate	Votes	%	±%
Independent	Peter Bennett*	123	38.8	N/A
Independent	James Thomson*	113	35.6	▲12.5
Independent	Xuelin Bates	81	25.6	
Turnout		317	44.0	
Independent gain from Independent				
Independent hold				

== Changes 2017–2022 ==
=== By-elections ===
==== Bishopsgate ====
The by-election followed the departure of independent common councillor Pooja Suri Tank, whose job required her to relocate to New York.

Bishopsgate by-election, 14 November 2017
Party	Candidate	Votes	%
Independent	Benjamin Daniel Murphy	112	67.9
Independent	Patrick Thomas Streeter	35	21.2
Independent	Timothy George Christie Becker	18	10.9
Turnout		165	
Independent hold			

The second Bishopsgate by-election followed the election of independent common councillor Prem Goyal as alderman for Portsoken in December 2017.

Bishopsgate by-election, 20 March 2018
Party	Candidate	Votes	%
Independent	Shravan Jashvantrai Joshi	72	41.6
Independent	Patrick Thomas Streeter	57	32.9
Independent	Joanna Abeyie	24	13.9
Labour	Adedamola Aminu	20	11.6
Turnout		173	17.9
Independent hold			

==== Billingsgate ====
The by-election followed the retirement of independent common councillor Michael Welbank.

Billingsgate by-election, 22 March 2018
Party	Candidate	Votes	%
Independent	John Allen-Petrie	40	44.4
Independent	Dawn Linsey Wright	30	33.3
Independent	Alpa Raja	14	15.6
Independent	Timothy George Christie Becker	6	6.7
Turnout		90	
Independent hold			

==== Castle Baynard ====
The by-election followed the election of independent common councillor Emma Edhem as alderman for Candlewick in July 2018.

Castle Baynard by-election, 9 October 2018
Party	Candidate	Votes	%
Labour	Natasha Lloyd-Owen	77	27.8
Independent	Julian Henry Malins	59	21.3
Independent	Alpa Raja	37	13.4
Independent	Merlene Soo Chin Emerson	36	13.0
Independent	Virginia Rounding	28	10.1
Independent	Richard William Humphreys	23	8.3
Independent	Deborah Mackintosh Oliver	12	4.3
Independent	Timothy George Christie Becker	5	1.8
Turnout		277	
Labour gain from Independent			

==== Cordwainer ====
The by-election followed the resignation of independent common councillor Sir Mark Boleat.

Cordwainer by-election, 30 April 2019
Party	Candidate	Votes	%
Independent	Tracey Graham	79	94.0
Independent	Timothy George Christie Becker	5	6.0
Turnout		84	30.9
Independent hold			

==== Farringdon Within ====
The by-election followed the resignation of independent common councillor Thomas Anderson.

Farringdon Within by-election, 24 July 2019
Party	Candidate	Votes	%
Independent	John Ernest Edwards	85	29.7
Independent	Virginia Rounding	84	29.4
Independent	David James Barker	50	17.5
Labour	Paul Andrew O'Brien	42	14.7
Independent	Ciara Marie Murphy	22	7.7
Independent	Emma Palmer	3	1.0
Turnout		286	22.4
Independent hold			

==== Coleman Street ====
The by-election followed the resignation of independent common councillor Stuart Fraser.

Coleman Street by-election, 30 July 2019
Party	Candidate	Votes	%
Independent	Dawn Linsey Wright	72	49.0
Independent	Alpa Raja	39	26.5
Labour	Bren Andrew Albiston	21	14.3
Independent	Timothy George Christie Becker	15	10.2
Turnout		147	22.6
Independent hold			

==== Aldersgate ====
The by-election followed the resignation of Labour common councillor Richard Crossan.

Aldersgate by-election, 13 November 2019
Party	Candidate	Votes	%
Labour	Helen Lesley Fentimen	260	47.1
Independent	Ian Bernard Burleigh	137	24.8
Independent	Heather Irene Thomas	93	16.8
Independent	Paul Martin Clifford	38	6.9
Independent	Shahnan Rajib Bakth	24	4.3
Turnout		552	34.4
Labour hold			
