= Will Taylor =

Will Taylor may refer to:

- Will Taylor (land speculator) (1853–1941), land speculator and founder of North Bend, Washington
- J. Will Taylor (1880–1939), U.S. Representative from Tennessee
- Will Taylor (Derbyshire cricketer) (1885–1976), Derbyshire cricketer and secretary of the club for 51 years
- Will Taylor (footballer) (1911–1999), Australian rules footballer
- Will Taylor (musician) (born 1968), musician from Austin, Texas
- Will Taylor (rugby union) (born 1991), Welsh rugby union player
- Will Taylor (music producer) (born 1991), music producer and songwriter from Leicester, UK
- Will Taylor (baseball) (born 2003), American baseball player
- Will Taylor (Emmerdale), a fictional character in British soap opera Emmerdale

== See also ==
- William Taylor (disambiguation)
