= Surrey Docks (ward) =

Electoral ward in London, England

- Electoral ward for the Southwark London Borough Council
- Surrey Docks ward boundaries since 2018
- Borough: Southwark
- County: Greater London
- Population: 13,388 (2021) (Note: 2021 Census data reported for 2022 ward boundaries)
- Electorate: 9,984 (2022)
- Major settlements: Rotherhithe, Surrey Quays
- Area: 1.274 square kilometres (0.492 sq mi)

Current electoral ward
- Created: 2002
- Seats: 3
- Councillors: Dan Whitehead; Nicola Salmon; Adam Hood
- Created from: Dockyard
- ONS code: 00BEGX (2002–2018)
- GSS code: E05011117 (2018–present)

Surrey Docks is an electoral ward in the London Borough of Southwark. The ward was first used in the 2002 elections. It returns three councillors to Southwark London Borough Council.

== List of councillors ==
Seat	Councillor	Took office	Left office	Party	Election
1	David Hubber	2002	2018	Liberal Democrats	2002 ... 2014
2	Gavin O'Brien	2002	2006	Liberal Democrats	2002
3	Lisa Rajan	2002	2016	Liberal Democrats	2002 ... 2014
2	Paul Noblet	2006	2014	Liberal Democrats	2006, 2010
2	James Okosun	2014	2018	Liberal Democrats	2014
3	Dan Whitehead	2016	2022	Liberal Democrats	2016, 2018
1	Nicola Salmon	2018	2022	Liberal Democrats	2018
2	Nick Johnson	2018	Incumbent	Liberal Democrats	2018, 2022
1	Jane Salmon	2022	Incumbent	Liberal Democrats	2022
3	Adam Hood	2022	Incumbent	Liberal Democrats	2022

== Southwark council elections since 2018 ==
There was a revision of ward boundaries in Southwark in 2018.

=== 2022 election ===
The election took place on 5 May 2022.

2022 Southwark London Borough Council election: Surrey Docks
Party	Candidate	Votes	%	±%
Liberal Democrats	Jane Salmon	1,475	46.1	−0.1
Liberal Democrats	Nick Johnson	1,329	41.5	−2.5
Liberal Democrats	Adam Hood	1,298	40.5	−9.7
Labour	Jen Thornton	1,095	34.2	+3.2
Labour	Amandeep Kellay	1,056	33.0	+6.7
Labour	Callum Parrish	920	28.7	+2.5
Green	Jason Conway	825	25.8	+10.9
Conservative	Hannah Ginnett	399	12.5	−2.5
Conservative	Andrew Cusack	371	11.6	−2.1
Conservative	Mark Findell	346	10.8	−5.1
Turnout		3,202	32.07	+0.60
Liberal Democrats hold		Swing		
Liberal Democrats hold		Swing		
Liberal Democrats hold		Swing		

=== 2018 election ===
The election took place on 3 May 2018.

2018 Southwark London Borough Council election: Surrey Docks
Party	Candidate	Votes	%	±%
Liberal Democrats	Dan Whitehead	1,475	50.2	
Liberal Democrats	Nicola Salmon	1,358	46.2	
Liberal Democrats	Nick Johnson	1,294	44.0	
Labour	Amy Clarke	911	31.0	
Labour	John Rule	773	26.3	
Labour	Will Tucker	770	26.2	
Conservative	Mark Findell	467	15.9	
Conservative	Hannah Ginnett	440	15.0	
Green	Sandra Lane	437	14.9	
Conservative	Simon Fox	403	13.7	
Majority				
Turnout		2,941	31.47	
Liberal Democrats win (new boundaries)				
Liberal Democrats win (new boundaries)				
Liberal Democrats win (new boundaries)				

== 2002–2018 Southwark council elections ==
Surrey Docks ward boundaries from 2002 to 2018

=== 2016 by-election ===
The by-election took place on 9 June 2016, following the resignation of Lisa Rajan.

2016 Surrey Docks by-election
Party	Candidate	Votes	%	±%
Liberal Democrats	Dan Whitehead	1,523	51.7	+24.4
Labour	Will Holmes	619	21.3	−1.9
Conservative	Craig Cox	380	12.9	−8.5
Green	Colin Boyle	218	7.4	−8.5
UKIP	Toby Prescott	187	6.3	−10.1
Independent	John Hellings	10	0.3	−15.2
Majority		904	30.4	+28.1
Turnout			29.9	
Liberal Democrats hold		Swing		

=== 2014 election ===
The election took place on 22 May 2014.

2014 Southwark London Borough Council election: Surrey Docks
Party	Candidate	Votes	%	±%
Liberal Democrats	David Hubber	1,039	33.9	−14.1
Liberal Democrats	Lisa Rajan	837	27.3	−12.7
Liberal Democrats	James Okosun	780	25.5	−21.0
Labour	Michael Bukenya	712	23.2	+4.3
Labour	Charles Stewart	697	22.8	+4.7
Conservative	John Anderson	655	21.4	−8.0
Labour	Imogen Shillito	632	20.6	+4.7
Conservative	Simon Fox	562	18.3	−8.5
Conservative	Rupert Myers	548	17.9	−7.4
UKIP	Toby Prescott	502	16.4	N/A
Green	Jacqueline Kearns	486	15.9	+6.9
UKIP	John Hellings	478	15.6	+11.9
Green	Jessica Olivier	360	11.8	N/A
Turnout		3,077	32.9	−22.5
Liberal Democrats hold		Swing		
Liberal Democrats hold		Swing		
Liberal Democrats hold		Swing		

=== 2010 election ===
The election on 6 May 2010 took place on the same day as the United Kingdom general election.

2010 Southwark London Borough Council election: Surrey Docks
Party	Candidate	Votes	%	±%
Liberal Democrats	David Hubber	2,385	48.0	+3.5
Liberal Democrats	Paul Noblet	2,310	46.5	+4.6
Liberal Democrats	Lisa Rajan	1,986	40.0	−0.8
Conservative	Laura Collins	1,463	29.4	−0.3
Conservative	Catherine Crook	1,331	26.8	−1.6
Conservative	Dominic Roberts	1,259	25.3	−1.6
Labour	John Percival	942	18.9	+1.1
Labour	Fran Rawcliffe	902	18.1	+2.6
Labour	Robert Smeath	788	15.9	+2.2
Green	George Raszka	445	9.0	−4.5
Independent	John Hellings	185	3.7	−11.8
Turnout		4,971	55.4	+27.9
Liberal Democrats hold		Swing		
Liberal Democrats hold		Swing		
Liberal Democrats hold		Swing		

=== 2006 election ===
The election took place on 4 May 2006.

2006 Southwark London Borough Council election: Surrey Docks
Party	Candidate	Votes	%	±%
Liberal Democrats	David Hubber	1,100	44.5	−14.9
Liberal Democrats	Paul Noblet	1,037	41.9	−16.2
Liberal Democrats	Lisa Rajan	1,009	40.8	−14.7
Conservative	David Frampton	735	29.7	+9.6
Conservative	Martin Cakebread	702	28.4	+8.9
Conservative	Simon Kingston	665	26.9	+9.0
Labour	Kathleen Whittam	441	17.8	+2.4
Labour	John Hellings	384	15.5	+3.4
Labour	Kamal Prashar	340	13.7	+2.9
Green	Rachelle Ferron	334	13.5	+6.4
Turnout		2,485	27.5	+7.0
Liberal Democrats hold		Swing		
Liberal Democrats hold		Swing		
Liberal Democrats hold		Swing		

=== 2002 election ===
The election took place on 2 May 2002.

2002 Southwark London Borough Council election: Surrey Docks
Party	Candidate	Votes	%	±%
Liberal Democrats	David Hubber	1,034	59.4	
Liberal Democrats	Gavin O'Brien	1,012	58.1	
Liberal Democrats	Lisa Rajan	966	55.5	
Conservative	Laura Collins	351	20.1	
Conservative	John Meakin	339	19.5	
Conservative	Julian Pratt	311	17.9	
Labour	Orville Foulkes	268	15.4	
Labour	Pearse Odunlami	210	12.1	
Labour	Samuel Ugbade	189	10.8	
Green	Katharine Dessau	124	7.1	
Green	John Spencer	84	4.8	
Green	Belen Bermudez	76	4.4	
Registered electors		8,517		New
Turnout		1,749	20.54	New
Rejected ballots		7	0.40	New
Liberal Democrats win (new seat)				
Liberal Democrats win (new seat)				
Liberal Democrats win (new seat)				
