= City of London Corporation elections =

Type of election

The City of London Corporation elections occur regularly to provide the elected representatives who run the City of London Corporation. These elections, with their use of plural voting, are conducted in ways unique to the United Kingdom.

Each of the 25 wards in the City of London are represented on the Court of Common Council by an Alderman and one or more Common Councilmen. The electors of the ward are registered annually with forms being sent to all residents and businesses in the City. This enables the registered voters to vote on the relevant ward list. In March 2013 12,479 business votes and 6,504 residential votes were registered, with only 27 per cent of the electorate being women.

== Ward elections ==
Common Council elections take place every four years. Aldermanic elections take place every six years.

=== Wardmote ===
All registered voters are invited to a wardmote. Where the number of candidates nominated equals the number of vacant places, those candidates are automatically returned. Nevertheless, a wardmote is held, where the voters of the ward can meet and question the candidates. If a poll is required it is held at this meeting.

== Sheriff elections ==
The City of London has two sheriffs, the Aldermanic Sheriff and the Non-Aldermanic Sheriff. They are both elected by the "Livery assembled in Common Hall" around Midsummers day.

== Recent years ==
- 2009 City of London Corporation election
- 2013 City of London Corporation election
- 2017 City of London Corporation election
- 2022 City of London Corporation election
- 2025 City of London Corporation election
