= Jeremiah Borst =

American settler (1830–1890)

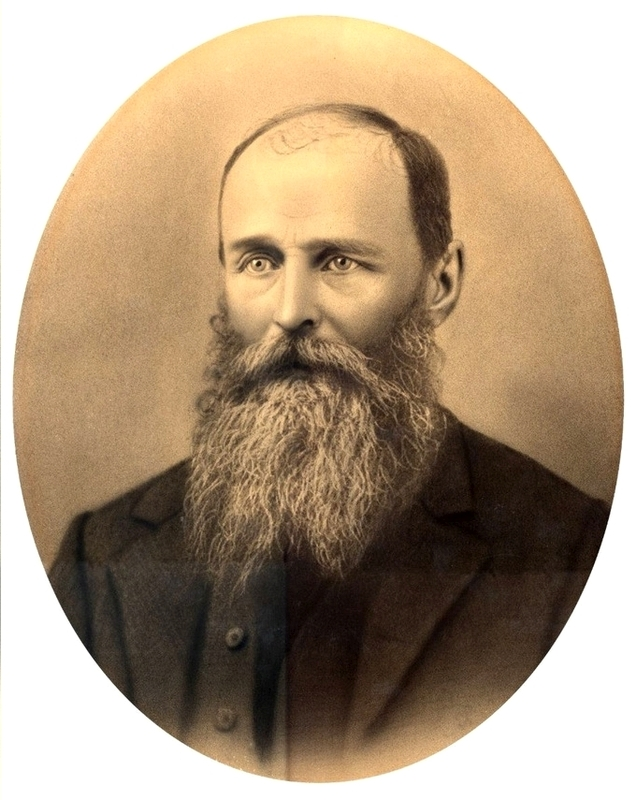
- Jeremiah Borst (1830–1890)

King County Commissioner
- In office January 1, 1875 – December 1, 1876
- Preceded by: Erasmus M. Smithers
- Succeeded by: M. R. Maddocks

Personal details
- Born: 1830 Tioga County, New York, U.S.
- Died: August 10, 1890 (aged 59–60) Hot Springs, Washington, U.S.

Jeremiah W. Borst (1830 – August 10, 1890) was the first permanent white settler in the upper Snoqualmie Valley region.

Born in 1830 to Willam Borst and Nancy Ann Bookout. Borst was raised in Tioga County, New York. In 1850, Borst traveled to California during the California Gold Rush. He used the proceeds to rent a farm near Sacramento. He moved to Seattle around 1858. His brother Joseph Borst had previously moved to Oregon Territory in 1846 and his sister Diana Borst Collins to Nisqually in 1847.

In the spring of 1858, Borst was on his way to Eastern Washington over the Cedar River trail, decided that the Snoqualmie Valley was too good to pass up. He moved into an abandoned building at Fort Alden, at present Snoqualmie. He raised hogs and apples and carried the goods for sale back to Seattle. He owned land in what is now Snoqualmie and North Bend.

In 1865, Borst accompanied Seattle pioneer Arthur Denny, William Perkins and a Snoqualmie native guide visited Snoqualmie Pass to make a plan to widen the trail to a wagon road. He oversaw construction of the first road through the pass in 1868.

While in the Valley, Borst married first a woman named Sally. She died around 1867. He married secondly Mina Kanim in 1868. They had several children, Bessie (1869-1869), John (1870-1947), Alice (1872-1952), William (1875-?) and an infant daughter (1876-1876). Mina died from complications to the birth of her last child. Borst married thirdly Kate Kanim Smith in 1879. They had two children Eva (1882-1937) and Jerry "Bud" (1886-1974).

In 1882 Borst sold most of his land in the upper Snoqualmie Valley to the Hop Growers Association which created the Snoqualmie Hop Ranch on the traditional Snoqualmie Prairie. Borst and his family moved to Fall City, where in 1887 he and Kate filed the official plat for the town in anticipation of the arrival of the Seattle, Lake Shore and Eastern Railway to the Valley.

Borst died of typhoid fever on August 10, 1890, at Green River Hot Springs, Washington. Friend and fellow Snoqualmie Valley pioneer Will Taylor described him in his obituary: "Jerry Borst was a kindly, gentle, honest man, always helping those who needed help. I do not know what the early settlers would have done without him. They all looked to Jerry for everything."

== See also ==
- Cedar River Trail
- Fall City, Washington
- Iron Horse State Park
- North Bend, Washington
- Snoqualmie, Washington
