= 2009 City of London Corporation election =

2009 UK local government election

- 16 March 2009

100 seats to the Court of Common Council 51 seats needed for a majority
	First party
Party	Independent
Last election	100 seats, 100%
Seats before	100
Seats won	100
Seat change	Steady
Popular vote	16,247
Percentage	94.5%
Swing	▼5.5%
Council control before election
No overall control
Council control after election
No overall control

The 2009 City of London Corporation election took place on 16 March 2009 to elect members of the Court of Common Council in the City of London Corporation, England. These elections take place every four years. 128 candidates contested 100 seats. This yielded only 13 wards where an election was needed to determine who should take the position. As in the previous election, most Council members were elected as independents. This was the first City of London election to be contested by the Labour party, who said they decided to run in order to provide voters a choice, and that residents were often overlooked in favour of the business lobby.

All 100 seats were won by independent candidates.

== Overall result ==
City of London Corporation Election, 2009
Party	Seats					Votes		
Party	Count	Gains	Losses	Net	Of total (%)	Of total (%)	Count	Change
Independent	100	0	0	Steady	100.0	94.5	16,247	▼5.5
Labour	0	0	0	Steady	0.0	5.5	938	▲5.5
Total	100							
