= Douglas Barrow =

British politician

Douglas Gordon Fleming Barrow MBE (born August 1951) has been a board member, advisor and chairman in the international maritime and shipping sectors and the City of London. He is a maritime professional with over 50 years international maritime experience and was an elected member of the City of London Corporation for the Ward of Aldgate.

== Early life ==
Born in Leicester he accompanied his parents to Nigeria in 1957, where he was educated before going to Loughborough Grammar School in 1960 and then Ashford Grammar School in 1964. In 1968 he joined Cunard-Brocklebank as a deck cadet at Warsash School of Navigation ultimately sailing as Second Officer having worked on dry-cargo and container ships as well as product tankers.

== Career ashore ==
Initially a petroleum inspector in Kuwait, Barrow started a 30-year career in the marine fuels industry working in Saudi Arabia, London and Singapore for Saudi, Japanese, American, Gibraltarian and Italian companies. During this time he was the founding chairman of the International Bunker Industry Association (1993/96). He also appeared as an expert witness in arbitrations and High Court hearings.

Barrow was Chief Executive of Maritime London (2006/17) promoting the UK as the world's premier maritime business centre, travelling extensively to Norway, Greece, Cyprus, Turkey, Russia, India and China. During this time he was involved in the formation of Maritime UK as well as London International Shipping Week

Other roles have included his consultancy Crusader Marine Ltd., Director for Marine One Stop Technologies (2009/12), board advisor to executive search consultants Horton International (2009/13), Director of TheCityUK (2013/15) and board advisor to the MFE Center in Shanghai (2015/17)

He was Director of the Maritime and Coastguard Agency responsible for the UK Ship Register (2017/19).

== City and Livery life ==
Barrow was elected to the Court of Common Council of the City of London Corporation in 2007 where he represented the Ward of Aldgate until he stood down in 2022. He served on numerous committees during that time and chaired the City of London Police Authority Board 2016/20.

He was Prime Warden of Worshipful Company of Shipwrights (2015/16), Master of the Worshipful Company of Fuellers (2003/04), President of the Anchorites (2010/11) and Chairman of the City of London Sea Cadets (1998/2003).

He is a Younger Brother of Trinity House.

== Honours ==
He was awarded an honorary doctorate in Maritime Studies by Southampton Solent University in 2015.

Barrow was appointed Member of the Order of the British Empire (MBE) in the 2021 New Year Honours for services to the maritime sector and the City of London.
