= 2014 Southwark London Borough Council election =

2014 local election in England

2014 Southwark Council election
- 22 May 2014

All 63 seats on Southwark London Borough Council 32 seats needed for a majority
	First party	Second party	Third party
Party	Labour	Liberal Democrats	Conservative
Last election	35 seats, 40.4%	25 seats, 30.96%	3 seats, 16.6%
Seats won	48	13	2
Seat change	▲13	▼12	▼1
Popular vote	34,163	14,310	9,479
Percentage	44.72%	18.73%	12.41%
Swing	▲4.32%	▼12.23%	▼4.19%
Council Control before election
Labour
Council control
Labour

Map of the results of the 2014 Southwark council election. Conservatives in blue, Labour in red and Liberal Democrats in yellow.

The 2014 Southwark Council election took place on 22 May 2014 to elect members of Southwark Borough Council in London, England. This was on the same day as other local elections.

Labour retained control winning 48 seats (+13). The Liberal Democrats won 13 seats (-12) and the Conservatives won 2 seats (-1).

== Results ==

Southwark Council election result 2014
Party	Seats	Gains	Losses	Net gain/loss	Seats %	Votes %	Votes	+/−
Labour	48	13	0	▲13	76.2	44.72	34,163	▲4.32
Liberal Democrats	13	0	12	▼12	20.6	18.73	14,310	▼12.23
Green	0	0	0	Steady	0.0	14.58	11,134	▲4.59
Conservative	2	0	1	▼1	3.2	12.41	9,479	▼4.19
UKIP	0	0	0	Steady	0.0	6.26	4,784	New
All People's Party	0	0	0	Steady	0.0	2.36	1,802	New
TUSC	0	0	0	Steady	0.0	0.94	718	New

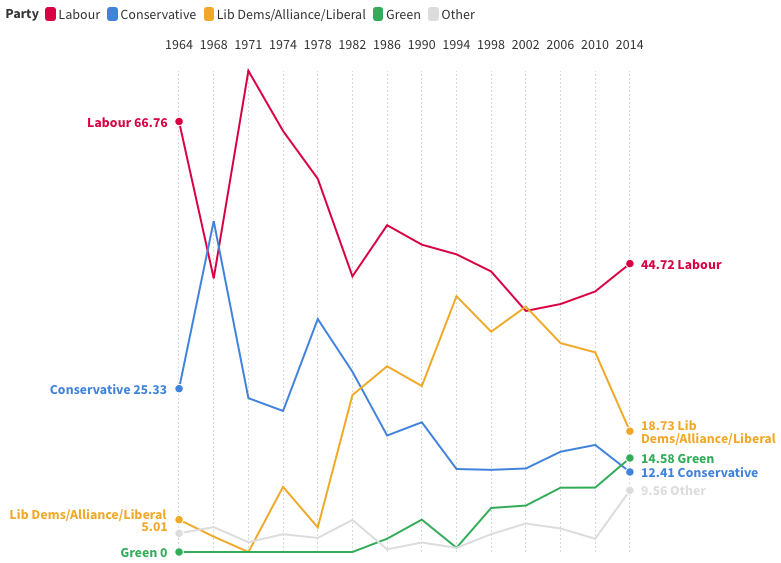
Southwark Council voting history

== Results by ward ==
=== Brunswick Park ===
Brunswick Park
Party	Candidate	Votes	%	±%
Labour	Radha Burgess	2,102	62.2	+7.7
Labour	Mark Williams*	1,861	55.0	+5.2
Labour	Ian Wingfield*	1,815	53.7	+6.3
Green	Alexis Fidgett	643	19.0	+3.7
Green	Andy Spring	576	17.0	+2.7
Green	Conor Masters-Kelly	546	16.1	+5.4
All People's Party	Jennifer Blake	360	10.6	N/A
Conservative	Stephen Phillips	347	10.3	−1.2
Conservative	Rebecca Wood	342	10.1	−0.2
Liberal Democrats	Elizabeth Dawson	287	8.5	−15.4
Conservative	Tomas Thurogood-Hyde	283	8.4	−1.2
Liberal Democrats	Pawel Swidlicki	230	6.8	−13.8
Liberal Democrats	Lorraine Zuleta	201	5.9	−11.0
Turnout		3,402	36.2	−22.1
Labour hold		Swing		
Labour hold		Swing		
Labour hold		Swing		

=== Camberwell Green ===
Camberwell Green
Party	Candidate	Votes	%	±%
Labour	Tom Flynn	2,141	63.5	+4.2
Labour	Dora Dixon-Fyle*	2,124	63.0	+4.4
Labour	Kieron Williams	1,933	57.3	+3.6
Green	Tracey Beresford	525	15.6	+7.5
Green	David Evans	360	10.7	+3.2
Green	Rosemary Friel	354	10.5	+4.9
Conservative	Robert Hayward	277	8.2	−1.8
Conservative	Colin Hann	271	8.0	−1.3
Liberal Democrats	Penny Lee	236	7.0	−14.0
Conservative	Marjorie Thompson	225	6.7	−2.7
Liberal Democrats	Georgina Orso	140	4.2	−8.8
Liberal Democrats	Richard Malins	136	4.0	−8.6
Turnout		3,391	32.2	−21.5
Labour hold		Swing		
Labour hold		Swing		
Labour hold		Swing		

=== Cathedrals ===
Cathedrals
Party	Candidate	Votes	%	±%
Liberal Democrats	Adele Morris*	1,642	41.6	−8.5
Liberal Democrats	David Noakes*	1,562	39.5	−4.1
Liberal Democrats	Maria Linforth-Hall	1,518	38.4	+2.2
Labour	Tom Heys	1,216	30.8	−0.4
Labour	Helen Dennis	1,210	30.6	+4.7
Labour	Sirajul Islam	1,037	26.2	+3.6
Green	Charlene Concepcion	512	13.0	+0.5
Conservative	Laura Collins	509	12.9	−3.9
Green	James Duckworth	473	12.0	+0.4
Conservative	James Webster	454	11.5	−4.3
Conservative	Eleanor Lyons	423	10.7	−3.9
Green	Ciaran Whitehead	394	10.0	N/A
UKIP	Peter Murray	343	8.7	N/A
Turnout		3,967	31.3	−21.0
Liberal Democrats hold		Swing		
Liberal Democrats hold		Swing		
Liberal Democrats hold		Swing		

=== Chaucer ===
Chaucer
Party	Candidate	Votes	%	±%
Labour	Claire Maugham	1,765	44.3	+9.2
Labour	Karl Eastham	1,758	44.1	+10.1
Labour	Vijay Luthra	1,645	41.3	+7.5
Liberal Democrats	Poddy Clark*	1,475	37.0	−4.9
Liberal Democrats	William Houngbo	1,283	32.2	−2.8
Liberal Democrats	Tim McNally*	1,276	32.0	−9.0
Green	Paul Blackman	719	18.0	+9.4
Conservative	Tom Packer	420	10.5	−5.0
Conservative	Suzie Didier-Garnham	414	10.4	−4.8
Conservative	Russell Woodrow	330	8.3	−5.8
TUSC	Emma Linacre	124	3.1	N/A
Turnout		4,010	35.0	−19.7
Labour gain from Liberal Democrats		Swing		
Labour gain from Liberal Democrats		Swing		
Labour hold		Swing		

=== College ===
College
Party	Candidate	Votes	%	±%
Labour	Helen Hayes*	2,287	56.3	+19.2
Labour	Andy Simmons*	2,070	50.9	+17.0
Labour	Jon Hartley	1,987	48.9	+17.1
Conservative	Lewis Robinson*	1,286	31.7	−0.7
Conservative	Lindsay Chatli	1,174	28.9	−2.3
Conservative	Stuart Millson	1,137	28.0	−2.4
Green	Kirsty Lothian	389	9.6	−0.4
Green	Robert Goodman	370	9.1	+1.2
Green	Jamie Vincent	346	8.5	+2.7
Liberal Democrats	Theresa Connolly	230	5.7	−19.6
Liberal Democrats	Brigid Gardner	219	5.4	−13.5
Liberal Democrats	John Hedley	201	4.9	−13.1
Turnout		4,087	46.4	−21.4
Labour hold		Swing		
Labour hold		Swing		
Labour gain from Conservative		Swing		

=== East Dulwich ===
East Dulwich
Party	Candidate	Votes	%	±%
Liberal Democrats	James Barber*	1,667	41.2	−3.8
Liberal Democrats	Rosie Shimell*	1,441	35.6	−2.8
Labour	Charlie Smith	1,342	33.2	+0.7
Liberal Democrats	Jonathan Mitchell*	1,298	32.1	−10.8
Labour	Katharine Morshead	1,298	32.1	+1.3
Labour	Cassim Bakharia	1,279	31.6	+1.5
Green	Sophie Armour	702	17.4	+6.1
Green	Abby Taubin	636	15.7	+6.7
Green	Paul Chaplin	463	11.4	+4.5
Conservative	Alan Broomhead	352	8.7	−5.8
Conservative	Joseph Lyons	346	8.6	−5.1
Conservative	Edith Okparaocha	294	7.3	−5.0
UKIP	Linda Stanbury	208	5.1	N/A
Turnout		4,053	43.4	−27.5
Liberal Democrats hold		Swing		
Liberal Democrats hold		Swing		
Labour gain from Liberal Democrats		Swing		

=== East Walworth ===
East Walworth
Party	Candidate	Votes	%	±%
Labour	Rebecca Lury*	1,693	58.6	+15.6
Labour	Darren Merrill*	1,549	53.6	+11.1
Labour	Martin Seaton*	1,510	52.2	+8.3
Liberal Democrats	Nicola Salmon	612	21.2	−18.3
Liberal Democrats	James Harper	552	19.1	−21.0
Liberal Democrats	Daniel Beckley	537	18.6	−14.1
Green	Joshua Draper	454	15.7	+7.3
Conservative	Philip Kemp	257	8.9	−3.1
Conservative	Emma Salisbury	249	8.6	−2.0
Conservative	Andreé Tutt	213	7.4	−3.0
All People's Party	Tess Obisesan	113	3.9	N/A
Turnout		2,915	36.0	−20.5
Labour hold		Swing		
Labour hold		Swing		
Labour hold		Swing		

=== Faraday ===
Faraday
Party	Candidate	Votes	%	±%
Labour	Lorraine Lauder*	1,590	62.3	+1.3
Labour	Paul W. Fleming	1,567	61.4	+6.0
Labour	Dan Garfield*	1,508	59.1	−1.6
Green	Rose Ades	302	11.8	+5.2
Green	Lynda Prieg	262	10.3	N/A
Green	Ian Pocock	251	9.8	N/A
Conservative	Toby Eckersley	245	9.6	−2.8
Conservative	Loanna Morrison	216	8.5	−3.8
Conservative	David Furze	210	8.2	−1.8
All People's Party	Gibrill Conteh	171	6.7	N/A
All People's Party	Juliet Atako	163	6.4	N/A
Liberal Democrats	Jelil Ladipo	163	6.4	−13.3
Liberal Democrats	Sarah Mustoe	139	5.4	−10.5
All People's Party	Alhaji Kanumansa	124	4.9	N/A
TUSC	Tracy Edwards	113	4.4	N/A
Liberal Democrats	Laurence Shimell	106	4.2	−10.6
Turnout		2,575	32.0	−19.7
Labour hold		Swing		
Labour hold		Swing		
Labour hold		Swing		

=== Grange ===
Grange
Party	Candidate	Votes	%	±%
Labour	Lucas Green	1,160	32.7	+3.6
Liberal Democrats	Ben Johnson	1,150	32.4	−13.2
Liberal Democrats	Damian O'Brien	1,071	30.2	−12.1
Labour	Octavia Lamb	1,065	30.0	+2.4
Liberal Democrats	Helen Walsh	1,052	29.6	−9.5
Labour	Emmanuel Oyewole**	942	26.5	−0.6
Conservative	Robert Ferguson	545	15.4	−4.8
UKIP	Patrick Curran	540	15.2	N/A
Conservative	Ben Spencer	513	14.5	−5.1
Green	Mark Denley	456	12.8	−1.0
Green	Jason Evers	398	11.2	N/A
Conservative	Ian Twinn	396	11.2	−6.7
Green	Daniel Thompson	314	8.8	N/A
TUSC	Arti Dillon	91	2.6	N/A
Turnout		3,562	30.9	−21.8
Labour gain from Liberal Democrats		Swing		
Liberal Democrats hold		Swing		
Liberal Democrats hold		Swing		

Emmanuel Oyewole was a sitting councillor for Camberwell Green ward

=== Livesey ===
Livesey
Party	Candidate	Votes	%	±%
Labour	Richard Livingstone*	1,965	64.7	+5.2
Labour	Evelyn Akoto	1,873	61.7	+6.1
Labour	Michael Situ *	1,817	59.8	+5.7
UKIP	Brian Turner	449	14.8	N/A
Green	William Nicholson	343	11.3	+5.8
Green	Tom Secretan	330	10.9	+6.7
Liberal Democrats	David Percik	251	8.3	−17.9
Liberal Democrats	Charles Callen	248	8.2	−16.3
Conservative	Derek Fordham	242	8.0	−1.3
Conservative	Margaret Fordham	217	7.1	−1.9
Conservative	Michael Salter	216	7.1	−3.0
Liberal Democrats	Indira Shiely	177	5.8	−16.8
All People's Party	Denis Pougin	142	4.7	N/A
Turnout		3,056	31.5	−23.6
Labour hold		Swing		
Labour hold		Swing		
Labour hold		Swing		

=== Newington ===
Southwark Council results website

Newington
Party	Candidate	Votes	%	±%
Labour	Maisie Anderson	2,299	53.2	+14.8
Labour	Neil Coyle*	2,280	52.8	+12.8
Labour	Eleanor Kerslake	2,122	49.1	+11.8
Liberal Democrats	Ciaran Lyne	1,035	24.0	−15.1
Liberal Democrats	Malica Scott	1,019	23.6	−14.3
Liberal Democrats	Daniel Whitehead	915	21.2	−15.2
Green	Sandra Lane	583	13.5	+4.7
Green	Solveig Rocher-Purchase	430	10.0	+2.6
Conservative	Stewart Carroll	351	8.1	−3.6
Conservative	Linda Joyce Sampson	299	6.9	−3.1
Conservative	Colm Howard-Lloyd	284	6.6	−2.6
UKIP	Richard Rees	254	5.9	+2.0
UKIP	Lee Evans	205	4.7	N/A
TUSC	Peter Offord	124	2.9	N/A
Turnout		4,354	40.7	−16.3
Labour hold		Swing		
Labour gain from Liberal Democrats		Swing		
Labour hold		Swing		

=== Nunhead ===
Nunhead
Party	Candidate	Votes	%	±%
Labour	Fiona Colley*	2,229	67.3	+11.9
Labour	Sunil Chopra*	1,936	58.5	+5.2
Labour	Sandra Rhule	1,820	55.0	+5.7
Green	Steve Barbe	714	21.6	+10.4
Green	Valerie Remy	555	16.8	+6.7
Green	Dave Tapsell	435	13.1	+3.6
All People's Party	Althea Smith*	323	9.8	−39.5
Conservative	Robert Clarke	298	9.0	−5.7
Conservative	Gerald Chan	255	7.7	−4.2
Conservative	Harry Chathli	237	7.2	−5.2
Liberal Democrats	Frances Blango	200	6.0	−16.6
Liberal Democrats	Paul Melly	189	5.7	−11.6
Liberal Democrats	Dolly Mace	163	4.9	−10.8
Turnout		3,336	34.3	−21.3
Labour hold		Swing		
Labour hold		Swing		
Labour hold		Swing		

Note: Althea Smith was elected in 2010 for the Labour Party, but defected to the All People's Party.

=== Peckham ===
Peckham
Party	Candidate	Votes	%	±%
Labour	Barrie Hargrove*	2,126	66.9	+0.4
Labour	Johnson Situ*	1,995	62.8	+0.1
Labour	Cleo Soanes*	1,903	59.9	+0.5
All People's Party	Donald Cole	327	10.3	N/A
Green	Sal Diniz	313	9.8	+3.3
Green	Pedro Machado	297	9.3	+4.2
Green	Ingrid Prikken	294	9.3	+5.1
All People's Party	Sharon Foster	239	7.5	N/A
All People's Party	Mariam Yusuff	215	6.8	N/A
Conservative	Eric Lansana	209	6.6	−2.5
UKIP	Christopher Field	201	6.3	N/A
Conservative	Jane Maclaren	182	5.7	−2.7
Liberal Democrats	Ola Oyewunmi	175	5.5	−13.4
Conservative	Josephine Ward	166	5.2	−2.2
Liberal Democrats	Richard Shearman	106	3.3	−10.8
Liberal Democrats	Christopher Taras	96	3.0	−8.5
Turnout		3,200	31.3	−22.0
Labour hold		Swing		
Labour hold		Swing		
Labour hold		Swing		

=== Peckham Rye ===
Peckham Rye
Party	Candidate	Votes	%	±%
Labour	Renata Hamvas*	2,084	54.2	+16.0
Labour	Gavin Edwards*	2,066	53.7	+10.0
Labour	Victoria Mills*	2,064	53.7	+13.3
Green	Gerard Bennett	789	20.5	+10.2
Green	Rachel Seiffert	735	19.1	+8.6
Green	Alexander Dunning	669	17.4	+9.1
Conservative	Megan Brown	583	15.2	+0.5
Conservative	Nathan Gamester	523	13.6	+0.5
Conservative	Adam Pimlott	510	13.3	+0.7
Liberal Democrats	Victoria Helyar-Cardwell	352	9.1	−26.0
Liberal Democrats	Paul Miles	291	7.6	−25.0
Liberal Democrats	Bob Skelly	271	7.0	−22.6
All People's Party	Ediri Okorode	68	1.8	N/A
Turnout		3,862	38.4	−28.7
Labour hold		Swing		
Labour hold		Swing		
Labour hold		Swing		

=== Riverside ===
Riverside
Party	Candidate	Votes	%	±%
Liberal Democrats	Anood Al-Samerai*	1,589	45.2	+8.3
Liberal Democrats	Eliza Mann*	1,465	41.7	+1.7
Liberal Democrats	Hamish McCallum	1,420	40.4	+1.9
Labour	Edward Davey	807	23.0	−1.5
Labour	Jonathan Samai	642	18.3	−2.9
Labour	Mayowa Sofekun	610	17.4	−2.7
Conservative	Fisher Dilke	589	16.8	−10.6
Conservative	Alisa Lockwood	567	16.1	−10.5
Conservative	Jonathan Roland	481	13.7	−11.9
Green	Willam Lavin	460	13.1	+2.2
UKIP	Charlotte Howard	459	13.1	N/A
UKIP	Jackie Webber	447	12.7	N/A
UKIP	Fernando Graca	431	12.3	N/A
TUSC	Gary Kandinsky	72	2.0	N/A
Turnout		3,524	34.1	−20.1
Liberal Democrats hold		Swing		
Liberal Democrats hold		Swing		
Liberal Democrats hold		Swing		

=== Rotherhithe ===
Rotherhithe
Party	Candidate	Votes	%	±%
Labour	Stephanie Cryan	1,370	40.0	+10.4
Labour	Kath Whittam	1,348	39.4	+10.8
Labour	Bill Williams	1,244	36.4	+11.3
Liberal Democrats	James Fearnley	934	27.3	−6.6
Liberal Democrats	Wilma Nelson*	921	26.9	−9.2
Liberal Democrats	Jeffrey Hook*	860	25.1	−11.5
UKIP	Ian Pheby	761	22.2	N/A
UKIP	Pat Lago	660	19.3	N/A
Green	Emily Haves	497	14.5	+4.4
Conservative	Eren Ezel	377	11.0	−7.3
Conservative	Pauline Boyle	357	10.4	−7.2
Conservative	Sam Packer	302	8.8	−8.6
TUSC	Mark Chaffey	88	2.6	N/A
Turnout		3,488	34.4	−19.0
Labour gain from Liberal Democrats		Swing		
Labour gain from Liberal Democrats		Swing		
Labour gain from Liberal Democrats		Swing		

=== South Bermondsey ===
South Bermondsey
Party	Candidate	Votes	%	±%
Labour	Catherine Dale	1,464	40.8	+7.0
Labour	Leo Pollak	1,345	37.5	+5.0
Labour	Sunny Lambe	1,317	36.7	+4.6
Liberal Democrats	Graham Neale*	1,234	34.4	−2.4
Liberal Democrats	Michael Bukola*	1,214	33.9	−3.2
Liberal Democrats	Paul Kyriacou*	1,211	33.8	−3.2
UKIP	Max Gammon	619	17.3	N/A
UKIP	Dean Conway	581	16.2	N/A
Green	Paula Orr	306	8.5	−1.2
Conservative	Dominic Roberts	236	6.6	−10.0
Conservative	James Sharp	187	5.2	−8.2
Conservative	Milly Skriczka	149	4.2	−8.8
TUSC	Bill Mullins	106	3.0	N/A
Turnout		3,594	37.7	−13.1
Labour gain from Liberal Democrats		Swing		
Labour gain from Liberal Democrats		Swing		
Labour gain from Liberal Democrats		Swing		

=== South Camberwell ===
South Camberwell
Party	Candidate	Votes	%	±%
Labour	Sarah King	1,915	55.0	+5.3
Labour	Peter John*	1,853	53.3	+7.1
Labour	Christopher Gonde	1,827	52.5	+5.5
Green	Eleanor Margolies	1,355	38.9	+23.7
Green	Susie Wheeldon	1,119	32.2	+8.5
Green	Chantal Purchase	1,009	29.0	+16.4
Conservative	Emily Barley	421	12.1	−3.3
Conservative	Damian Fox	363	10.4	−2.8
Conservative	Graham Davison	351	10.1	−1.5
Liberal Democrats	Jonathan Hunt	315	9.1	−18.8
Liberal Democrats	Columba Blango**	283	8.1	−9.3
Liberal Democrats	Denise Capstick**	237	6.8	−9.3
All People's Party	Colin Hunte	221	6.4	N/A
UKIP	Amy Carruthers	216	6.2	N/A
UKIP	Russell Gray	210	6.0	N/A
UKIP	James Tillyard	197	5.7	N/A
Turnout		3,497	39.6	−23.9
Labour hold		Swing		
Labour hold		Swing		
Labour hold		Swing		

Columba Blango was a sitting councillor for Rotherhithe ward

Denise Capstick was a sitting councillor for Grange ward

=== Surrey Docks ===
Surrey Docks
Party	Candidate	Votes	%	±%
Liberal Democrats	David Hubber*	1,039	33.9	−14.1
Liberal Democrats	Lisa Rajan*	837	27.3	−12.7
Liberal Democrats	James Okosun	780	25.5	−21.0
Labour	Michael Bukenya	712	23.2	+4.3
Labour	Charles Stewart	697	22.8	+4.7
Conservative	John Anderson	655	21.4	−8.0
Labour	Imogen Shillito	632	20.6	+4.7
Conservative	Simon Fox	562	18.3	−8.5
Conservative	Rupert Myers	548	17.9	−7.4
UKIP	Toby Prescott	502	16.4	N/A
Green	Jacqueline Kearns	486	15.9	+6.9
UKIP	John Hellings	478	15.6	+11.9
Green	Jessica Olivier	360	11.8	N/A
Turnout		3,077	32.9	−22.5
Liberal Democrats hold		Swing		
Liberal Democrats hold		Swing		
Liberal Democrats hold		Swing		

=== The Lane ===
The Lane
Party	Candidate	Votes	%	±%
Labour	Jasmine Ali	2,369	60.8	+9.9
Labour	Nick Dolezal*	2,064	53.0	+2.8
Labour	Jamille Mohammed	1,967	50.5	+9.2
Green	Anna Plodowski	1,105	28.4	+13.8
Green	Tom Chance	1,076	27.6	+7.2
Green	Remco Van Der Stoep	1,011	26.0	+16.6
Conservative	Rebecca Foreman	457	11.7	−0.6
Conservative	Barry Joseph	437	11.2	−0.6
Conservative	Ami Upadhyay	345	8.9	−2.4
Liberal Democrats	Tom Holder	291	7.5	−18.6
Liberal Democrats	Tam Giles	282	7.2	−12.8
Liberal Democrats	Kyle Taylor	201	5.2	−10.9
All People's Party	Lamine Konate	162	4.2	N/A
Turnout		3,936	35.5	−23.5
Labour hold		Swing		
Labour hold		Swing		
Labour hold		Swing		

=== Village ===
Village
Party	Candidate	Votes	%	±%
Conservative	Andrew Mitchell*	1,674	38.0	+4.2
Conservative	Jane Lyons	1,622	36.8	+3.8
Labour	Anne Kirby	1,454	33.0	+3.9
Conservative	David Bradbury	1,452	33.0	+0.1
Labour	Andrew Rice	1,441	32.7	+5.4
Labour	Simon Taylor	1,380	31.3	+6.3
Liberal Democrats	Robin Crookshank Hilton*	948	21.5	−14.7
Green	Adrian Halfyard	577	13.1	−1.1
Liberal Democrats	James Gurling	549	12.5	−15.7
Green	Edmund Caldecott	500	11.4	+4.3
Green	David Jennings	470	10.7	N/A
Liberal Democrats	Harry Niazi	405	9.2	−18.7
UKIP	Michael King	358	8.1	N/A
Turnout		4,416	54.6	−19.6
Conservative hold		Swing		
Conservative hold		Swing		
Labour gain from Liberal Democrats		Swing		

== By-Elections 2014-2018 ==
Chaucer by-election, 7 May 2015
Party	Candidate	Votes	%	±%
Labour	Helen Dennis	2,951	43.5	−0.8
Liberal Democrats	William Houngbo	1,532	22.6	−9.6
Conservative	Michael Dowsett	1,178	17.3	+6.8
Green	Gareth Rees	564	8.3	−9.7
UKIP	Dean Conway	474	7.0	N/A
Independent	Piers Corbyn	67	1.0	N/A
All People's Party	Ade Lasaki	25	0.4	N/A
Majority		1,419	20.9	+16.6
Turnout			63.9	+28.9
Labour hold		Swing		

The by-election was called following the resignation of Councillor Claire Maugham.

College by-election, 7 May 2016
Party	Candidate	Votes	%	±%
Labour	Catherine Rose	2,258	45.7	−10.6
Conservative	Kate Bramson	1,269	25.7	−6.0
Liberal Democrats	Brigid Gardner	699	14.1	+8.7
Green	Dale Rapley	371	7.5	−2.1
UKIP	Toby Prescott	318	6.4	N/A
All People's Party	Michael Dowsett	25	0.5	N/A
Majority		989	20.0	+2.8
Turnout			58.4	+12.0
Labour hold		Swing		

The by-election was called following the resignation of Councillor Helen Hayes, the Member of Parliament for Dulwich and West Norwood.

Newington by-election, 13 May 2016
Party	Candidate	Votes	%	±%
Labour	James Coldwell	2,829	59.3	+6.5
Liberal Democrats	Martin Shapland	694	14.5	−9.5
Green	Nick Hooper	464	9.7	−3.8
Conservative	Gige Aarons	458	9.6	+1.5
UKIP	Gawain Towler	237	5.0	−0.9
All People's Party	Terry Adewale	45	0.9	N/A
Independent	Michelle Baharier	45	0.9	N/A
Majority		2,135	44.8	+19.7
Turnout			46.1	+6.1
Labour hold		Swing		

The by election was called following the resignation of Councillor Neil Coyle, the Member of Parliament for Bermondsey and Old Southwark.

Surrey Docks by-election, 9 June 2016
Party	Candidate	Votes	%	±%
Liberal Democrats	Dan Whitehead	1,523	51.7	+24.4
Labour	Will Holmes	619	21.3	−1.9
Conservative	Craig Cox	380	12.9	−8.5
Green	Colin Boyle	218	7.4	−8.5
UKIP	Toby Prescott	187	6.3	−10.1
Independent	John Hellings	10	0.3	−15.2
Majority		904	30.4	+28.1
Turnout			29.9	−3.0
Liberal Democrats hold		Swing		

The by-election was called following the resignation of Councillor Lisa Rajan.
