= 2013 City of London Corporation election =

- 21 March 2013

100 seats to the Court of Common Council 51 seats needed for a majority
	First party
Party	Independent
Last election	100 seats, 94.5%
Seats won	100
Seat change	Steady
Popular vote	3,409
Percentage	80.4%
Swing	▼14.1%
- Results by ward. Red represents Labour. Grey represents Independents. Wards coloured dark grey did not hold contests.
Council control before election
No overall control
Council control after election
No overall control

The 2013 City of London Corporation election took place on 21 March 2013 to elect members of the Court of Common Council in the City of London Corporation, England. These elections take place every four years. As in the previous election, the vast majority of Council members were elected as independents.

All 100 seats were won by independent candidates

== Overall result ==
City of London Corporation Election, 2013
Party	Seats					Votes		
Party	Count	Gains	Losses	Net	Of total (%)	Of total (%)	Count	Change
Independent	100	0	0	Steady	100.0	80.4	3,409	-14.1
Labour	0	0	0	Steady	0.0	19.6	832	+14.1
Total	100							

== By-elections ==
In a subsequent by-election in the Portsoken ward in 2014 the Labour party won its first ever councillor in the Corporation: William Campbell-Taylor, an Anglican priest who had campaigned for higher ethical standards in the City.

Portsoken by-election, March 2014
Party	Candidate	Votes	%	±%
Labour	William Campbell-Taylor	137	36.8	
Independent	Marie Brockington	98	26.3	
Independent	Evan Millner	47	12.6	
Independent	Syed Mahmood	44	11.8	
Independent	Roger Jones	26	7.0	
Independent	André Walker	11	3.0	
Independent	Muhammad Al-Hussaini	9	2.4	
Majority		39	10.5	
Turnout		372	43.26	
Labour gain from Independent		Swing		
