= Portsoken (electoral ward) =

Coordinates: 51.5144°N 0.0752°W

- Electoral ward for the Court of Common Council of the City of London Corporation
- Portsoken ward boundaries since 2013
- District: City of London
- County: Greater London
- Major settlements: Portsoken

Current electoral ward
- Number of members: 4 councillors; 1 alderman
- GSS code: E05000021 (2003–2013); E05009308 (2013–present)

Portsoken is an electoral ward for Portsoken in the City of London, England. It returns four councillors and one alderman to the Court of Common Council of the City of London Corporation.

== Councillor elections ==
=== 2025 election ===
The election took place on 20 March 2025.

2025 City of London Corporation election: Portsoken (4)
Party	Candidate	Votes	%	±%
Independent	John Fletcher	219		
Independent	Samapti Bagchi	207		
Independent	Jason Pritchard	183		
Independent	Munsur Ali	171		
Independent	Aline Koztepe	115		
Independent	Hanif Ali	113		
Labour	Joe Verlander	52		
Labour	Dil-Veer Kang	36		
Turnout			49%	
Independent hold				
Independent gain from Independent				
Independent hold				
Independent hold				

=== 2022 election ===
The election took place on 24 March 2022. The Common Council election in Portsoken Ward recorded the highest turnout in the 2022 Citywide Common Council Elections with 57.6% of the electorate casting their vote. The average turnout across the rest of the City of London was much lower at 36.5%. Two incumbent councillors, Munsur Ali and Jason Pritchard, who were elected as Labour candidates in 2017, stood jointly and were both re-elected. John Fletcher and Henry Jones stood jointly and were both re-elected. Changes in voteshare are by party for the Labour candidates and by candidate for independent candidates who previously stood as independents.

2022 City of London Corporation election: Portsoken (4)
Party	Candidate	Votes	%	±%
Independent	John Fletcher	255	21.8	▲4.6
No description	Munsur Ali	254	21.7	N/A
No description	Jason Pritchard	239	20.5	N/A
Independent	Henry Jones	213	18.2	▲1.9
Labour	Lana Joyce	114	9.8	▼10.2
Labour	Dominic Hauschild	56	4.8	▼14.1
Women's Equality	Alison Smith	37	3.2	N/A
Turnout		1,168	57.6	▲6.9
Independent hold				
No description gain from Labour		Swing	–	
No description gain from Labour		Swing	–	
Independent hold				

=== 2017 election ===
The election took place on 23 March 2017.

2017 City of London Corporation election: Portsoken (4)
Party	Candidate	Votes	%	±%
Labour	Jason Pritchard	230	20.0	▲10.2
Labour	Munsur Ali	210	18.3	N/A
Independent	John Fletcher	197	17.2	▼1.3
Independent	Henry Jones	187	16.3	▼3.6
Independent	Ayesha Azad	153	13.3	N/A
Independent	Asif Sadiq	111	9.7	N/A
Independent	David Barker	60	5.2	N/A
Turnout		1,148	50.7	
Labour gain from Independent				
Labour gain from Independent				
Independent hold				
Independent hold				

=== 2014 by-election ===
The by-election took place on 20 March 2014.

2014 Portsoken by-election
Party	Candidate	Votes	%	±%
Labour	William Campbell-Taylor	137	36.8	
Independent	Marie Brockington	98	26.3	
Independent	Evan Millner	47	12.6	
Independent	Syed Mahmood	44	11.8	
Independent	Roger Jones	26	7.0	
Independent	André Walker	11	3.0	
Independent	Muhammad Al-Hussaini	9	2.4	
Majority		39	10.5	
Turnout		372	43.26	
Labour gain from Independent		Swing		

== Aldermanic elections ==
=== 2017 by-election ===
The by-election took place on 14 December 2017. Michael Bear became alderman in 2005 and resigned in 2017. This led to the first aldermanic election in the City of London Corporation contested by the Labour Party. The election was won by Prem Goyal, founder of the All People's Party, although he stood as an independent.

2017 Portsoken by-election
Party	Candidate	Votes	%	±%
Independent	Prem Goyal	228	58.31	
Labour	William Campbell-Taylor	143	36.57	
Independent	David Barker	20	5.12	
Independent	Anthony Samuels	2	0.51	
Turnout		396	61.68	

=== List of aldermen ===
- 1891–1921 Sir Marcus Samuel (Lord Mayor 1902–1903). He became the first Viscount Bearsted in 1925, two years before his death in 1927.
- 1921–33 Isidore Jacobs, except 19 July–20 September 1927 when there was no alderman for Portsoken
- 1933–44 Sir Samuel Joseph (Lord Mayor 1942–1943)
- 1944–46 Edmund Dutton
- 1946–49 Keith Joseph, son of Sir Samuel Joseph
- 1949–84 Sir Bernard Waley-Cohen (Lord Mayor 1960–61)
- 1984–2006 Peter Levene, Baron Levene of Portsoken (Lord Mayor 1998–99)
- 2006–17 Sir Michael Bear (Lord Mayor 2010–2011)
- 2017–present Prem Goyal
