= Ben Lippen School =

Location
- 7401 Monticello Road; Columbia, South Carolina 29203; United States

Information
- School type: Private Elementary, Middle, and High School
- Established: 1940; 86 years ago
- School district: Private School CIU Owned
- Principal: Kelli Larsen – Lower School Corey Thompson – Middle School Max Russell – High School
- Headmaster: Ben Porter
- Faculty: 140
- Grades: K–12
- Student to teacher ratio: 15:1
- Campus size: 3 miles
- Colors: Green & Gold
- Mascot: Falcons
- Newspaper: The Falcon Forum
- Website: https://www.benlippen.com/

Ben Lippen School is private K–12 Christian school in Columbia, South Carolina.

== History ==
A Scottish phrase meaning "Mountain of Trust," Ben Lippen School was founded in 1940 by the Columbia International University (CIU) board of trustees under the guidance of CIU's first president, Robert C. McQuilkin. The evangelical boarding school for boys was located at CIU's Ben Lippen Conference Center on a mountain near Asheville, NC. The school became co-educational in 1952 and flourished as a school for missionary children. After a fire destroyed the main building in 1980, Ben Lippen moved its high school program to its current location in Columbia, South Carolina, in 1988 to be on the campus of CIU. An elementary program was begun in 1990 and currently boasts three campuses, one at the Monticello Road location, one on Hardscrabble Road in Columbia, and another on St. Andrews Road in Columbia. All upper school students attend the Monticello Road campus. During the Covid 19 epidemic the school was one of few that was open.

Today, Ben Lippen School has more than 1,160 students in grades Pre-K3 through 12, with approximately 80 of them being international students who live on campus and attend the high school. Ben Lippen is accredited by both CESA (Council on Educational Standards and Accountability) and SACS (Southern Association of Colleges and Schools) and is a member of the South Carolina Independent School Association (SCISA).

== Notable alumni ==
- Andrew Brunson, pastor & evangelical missionary
- Samkon Gado, former NFL player
- Will Taylor, baseball outfielder in the Pittsburgh Pirates organization
