= St. Mary's Cemetery, Wandsworth =

Cemetery in Wandsworth, London

Coordinates: 51°27.5′N 0°10.2′W

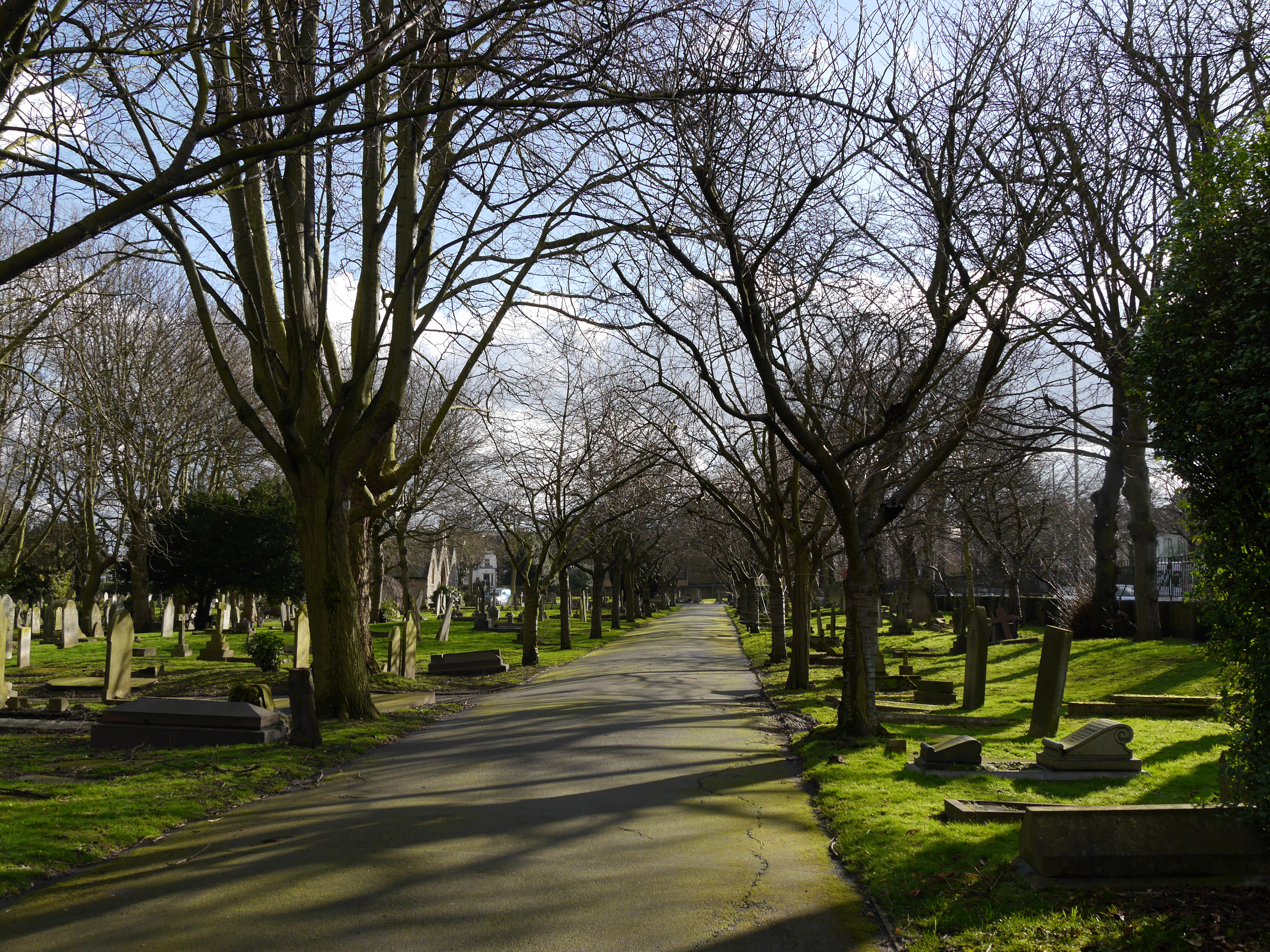
St. Mary's Cemetery, Wandsworth

St Mary's Cemetery is a cemetery opened in 1860 in Wandsworth, London. It was established by St Mary's Burial Board in part of Wandsworth Common. It has also been known as Battersea St Mary's Cemetery and Battersea Rise Cemetery.

Its burial land was exhausted in the 1960s. There is a small chapel where services can be conducted. It is owned by the London Borough of Wandsworth.

Notable burials include:

- John Burns, trade unionist and politician, MP for Battersea
- Sir William Anderson Rose, Lord Mayor of London, MP for Southampton
- William Taylor, headmaster of Sir Walter St John's Grammar School For Boys for 34 years from 1873 to 1907

The cemetery contains the war graves of 15 British service personnel from World War I and 3 from World War II.
