= Erasmus M. Smithers =

American pioneer (1830–1905)

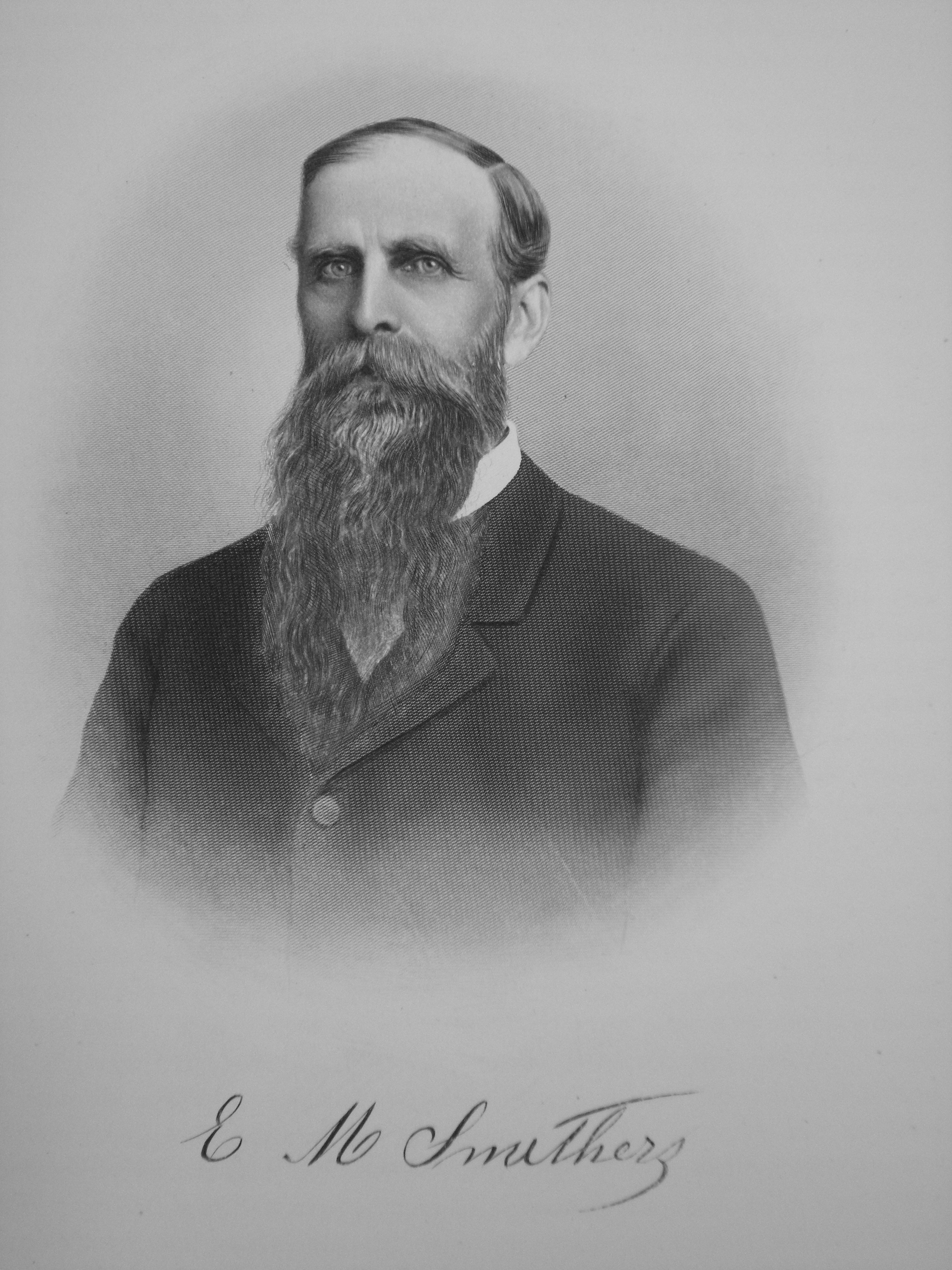

King County Commissioner
- In office August 1, 1874 – January 1, 1875
- Preceded by: J. T. Stewart
- Succeeded by: Jeremiah Borst

Personal details
- Born: February 17, 1830; Virginia, U.S.
- Died: 1905 (aged 74–75); Renton, Washington, U.S.

Erasmus M. Smithers (February 17, 1830 – November 20, 1905) was one of the European pioneers of the Pacific coast and the founder of the city of Renton, King County, Washington. His wife and her first husband had settled on the land where the town is now located in 1853, fifteen miles (24 km) from what is now Seattle. At the time there were no white settlers at a point nearer than Seattle, which was then a frontier settlement.

== Early life ==
Smithers was born in Virginia on February 17, 1830, to a family being of English origin and which had been among the early settlers in Virginia and North Carolina. His father, Samuel Smithers, a farmer, was born in Virginia, and married a Miss Hale, also a member of one of the old families of that state.

He was raised in Virginia, and his early education was very limited in scope. At age 19, he left Virginia and set out for the west. A friend had informed him that two young ladies were about to leave for Oregon with a company, and that one of the members of the party, Green Olds, desired to secure the services of a young man to aid him during the journey across the plains.

== Journey west ==
He paid $50 to join the company. On May 8, 1852, the company embarked with twenty wagons drawn by ox teams. 15 miles (24 km) west of Omaha, Nebraska, a large band of Indians met them at a bridge and demanded a payment of one dollar a wagon before they passed on, but the settlers were able to fight them off.

The trip Iowa City, Iowa to The Dalles, Oregon took six months, and they then continued to Portland, Oregon where Smithers found a job assisting in the construction of a mill. In April 1853, he went to Seattle, selling timber to ships bound to San Francisco, California. He brought with him from Portland three yoke of cattle and hauled logs to build the Fort Madison, Washington mill. When the Indian war of 1855 broke out, he volunteered for service, and continued a member of the volunteer militia until 1856.

== Renton settlement ==
In November 1857, he married Diana B. Gilman (born 1824, Orono, Maine), the widow of Henry H. Tobin. Diana and Henry had married in Lincoln, Maine in March 1851, and had been the first settlers of the Renton area in 1853, where they had built a timber mill in 1854. During the Puget Sound war with the Duwamish natives in 1855, the mill burnt down and the settlers were driven away. Soon after their wedding Erasmus and Diana moved to Tobin's 320 acres (1.3 km^{2}) claim and claimed another neighboring 160 acres (0.65 km^{2}), which were wilderness at the time. A Duwamish Indian village stood on the claim site. The Smithers built a small home, where they lived initially and where their children, Ada (1858), Edwin M. (1862), and Fred G. (1866), were born. They built a larger house in 1875.

Smithers platted the town of Renton from land he owned and placed the lots on the market. With several others, he established the Renton Coal Company, selling his interest soon after. The coal seam had been discovered in Renton in 1853 or 1854 by Henry Tobin's first neighbor, Dr. R.M. Bigelow.

== Later life ==
A lifelong member of the Democratic Party, his first vote having been cast in support of Isaac I. Stevens for governor of the territory. He was a member of the Washington Pioneer Society and during the American Civil War he was initiated into the Freemasonry, being one of the first members of St. John's Lodge of Seattle, one of the first lodges instituted in the territory.

He was on board of trustees of the South Prairie Coal Mining Company. He was appointed by Governor Edward Selig Salomon and once by Governor Elisha Peyre Ferry a trustee of University of Washington and was elected president of the board of regents.

== Notes ==
- This article incorporates text from "A Volume of Memoirs and Genealogy of Representative Citizens of the City of Seattle and County of King, Washington." New York and Chicago: Lewis Publishing Co., 1903. p. 96.

=== References ===
- "Renton, Where the Water Took Wing" by Buerge
- Renton Historical Quarterly 19.p65
