= All People's Party (UK) =

Political party in the United Kingdom

The All People's Party (APP) was a political party established in the United Kingdom in 2013.

== History ==
The party was established owing to concerns that insufficient participants from ethnic minorities were given leadership roles by the main parties. Their motto is ‘Celebrate diverse people at the top, not just diversity’.

== 2015 General Election ==
Prem Goyal, the founder of the APP, claimed "the 45 per cent talented minority population in Southwark, which generates 70 per cent of the Labour votes, get only 10 per cent representation at the top decision-making table." This, he stated, translated economically as "for every £1 these hard-working, talented people contribute to Labour, they are only given 13p back."

In the 2015 United Kingdom general election the party stood two candidates in the Southwark constituencies, however failed to gain a substantial number of votes: 826 for Prem Goyal, Camberwell and Peckham and 59 for Dan Cole, Bermondsey and Old Southwark. Goyal had previously been the vice-chair of Bermondsey and Old Southwark Labour Party and only started the APP after he lost the election to become the Labour Party candidate for the constituency.

== Elected Representatives ==
In 2013, when the party was founded it gained fourcouncillors in the London Borough of Southwark. They represented the party for 8 months. They had formerly been elected as members of the Labour Party. In the Southwark London Borough Council election, 2014 the APP stood 15 candidates. However, despite gaining 2,828 votes, they failed to get any councillors elected.

In March 2017, Prem Goyal stood for election in the City of London in the Court of Common Council elections in Bishopsgate Ward as an Independent candidate and was elected on 23 March 2017.

In December 2017, Goyal stood and won again as an independent candidate in an Aldermanic by-election in Portsoken of the city.

== Dissolution ==
The All People's Party was entered on the Electoral Commission's Register of Political Parties from August 2013 to April 2020.
