= Fast Company =

American business magazine

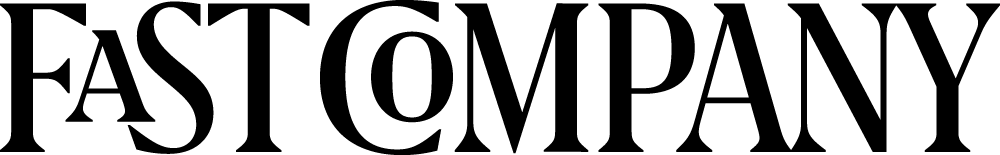

- Winter 2023 cover, featuring Marques Brownlee
- Editor: Brendan Vaughan
- Categories: Business magazine
- Frequency: Quarterly
- Publisher: Fast Company, Inc.
- Total circulation: 757,858 (June 2012)
- First issue: November 1995
- Company: Mansueto Ventures
- Country: United States
- Language: English
- Website: www.fastcompany.com
- ISSN: 1085-9241
- OCLC: 33444063

Fast Company is an American business magazine published monthly in print and online, focusing on technology, business, future of work and design. It releases six print issues annually, in addition to various ranking lists, podcasts, and newsletters.

== History ==
Fast Company was founded in November 1995 by Alan Webber and Bill Taylor, both former Harvard Business Review editors, and publisher Mortimer Zuckerman. Early competitors included Red Herring, Business 2.0 and The Industry Standard.

In 1997, Fast Company created an online social network called the "Company of Friends", which led to the formation of numerous meeting groups. At its peak, Company of Friends comprised over 40,000 members across 120 cities, though membership declined to 8,000 by 2003.

In 2000, Zuckerman sold Fast Company to Gruner + Jahr, majority-owned by media giant Bertelsmann, for $550 million. The sale coincided with the dot-com bubble burst, resulting in substantial losses and a drop in circulation. Webber and Taylor departed in 2002, and John A. Byrne, formerly a senior writer and management editor at BusinessWeek, became the new editor. Under Byrne, the magazine received its first Gerald Loeb Award. However, the magazine couldn't overcome its financial decline following the dot-com bust. Despite not focusing specifically on Internet commerce, advertising pages decreased to one-third of their 2000 levels.

In 2005, Gruner + Jahr put the magazine, along with Inc. magazine, up for sale. Byrne contacted entrepreneur Joe Mansueto and assisted him in the acquisition. A bidding war ensued between The Economist and Mansueto's company, Mansueto Ventures. Mansueto, promising to keep Fast Company afloat, won the contest, acquiring both magazine titles for $35 million. As of March 2025, advertising sales make up 55 percent of the company's revenue.

Under former editor-in-chief Robert Safian, Fast Company was recognized by the American Society of Magazine Editors with the magazine of the year in 2014.

Stephanie Mehta was appointed editor-in-chief in February 2018, after having worked at Vanity Fair, Bloomberg, Fortune, and The Wall Street Journal. Fast Company is owned by Mansueto Ventures and has its headquarters in Manhattan.

In September 2022, the Fast Company website, fastcompany.com, was compromised in an attack, and racist messages were sent to Apple iPhones. The site was accessed to send push notifications that the company identified as "obscene and racist". Consequently, the site was taken offline for eight days.

In March 2025, Fast Company and Inc. tightened their paywalls to grow consumer revenue amid traffic volatility, with four daily stories being reserved only for paying subscribers. Mehta said that "traffic is really fickle, and we have to find more ways to build a direct connection with our audiences." She also predicted Mansueto's consumer business (one-third of the company's overall annual revenue) to see double-digit growth in 2025. In June 2025, Mansueto Ventures laid off 13 employees, including numerous editors and reporters at Fast Company and Inc.

== Website ==
Launched in 1995, FastCompany.com provides coverage of leadership and innovation in business, environmental and social issues, entertainment and marketing, and, through its Co.Design site, the intersection of business and design, spanning architecture to electronics and consumer products to fashion. Fast Company also previously managed sites called Co.Labs, Co.Exist, and Co.Create. Co.Exist and Co.Create were rebranded as Ideas and Entertainment sections in 2017. Co.Labs was discontinued in early 2015.

== Franchises ==
Fast Company runs several franchises, including "Most Innovative Companies", "World Changing Ideas", "Innovation By Design", and "Most Creative People".
