= William Taylor (headmaster) =

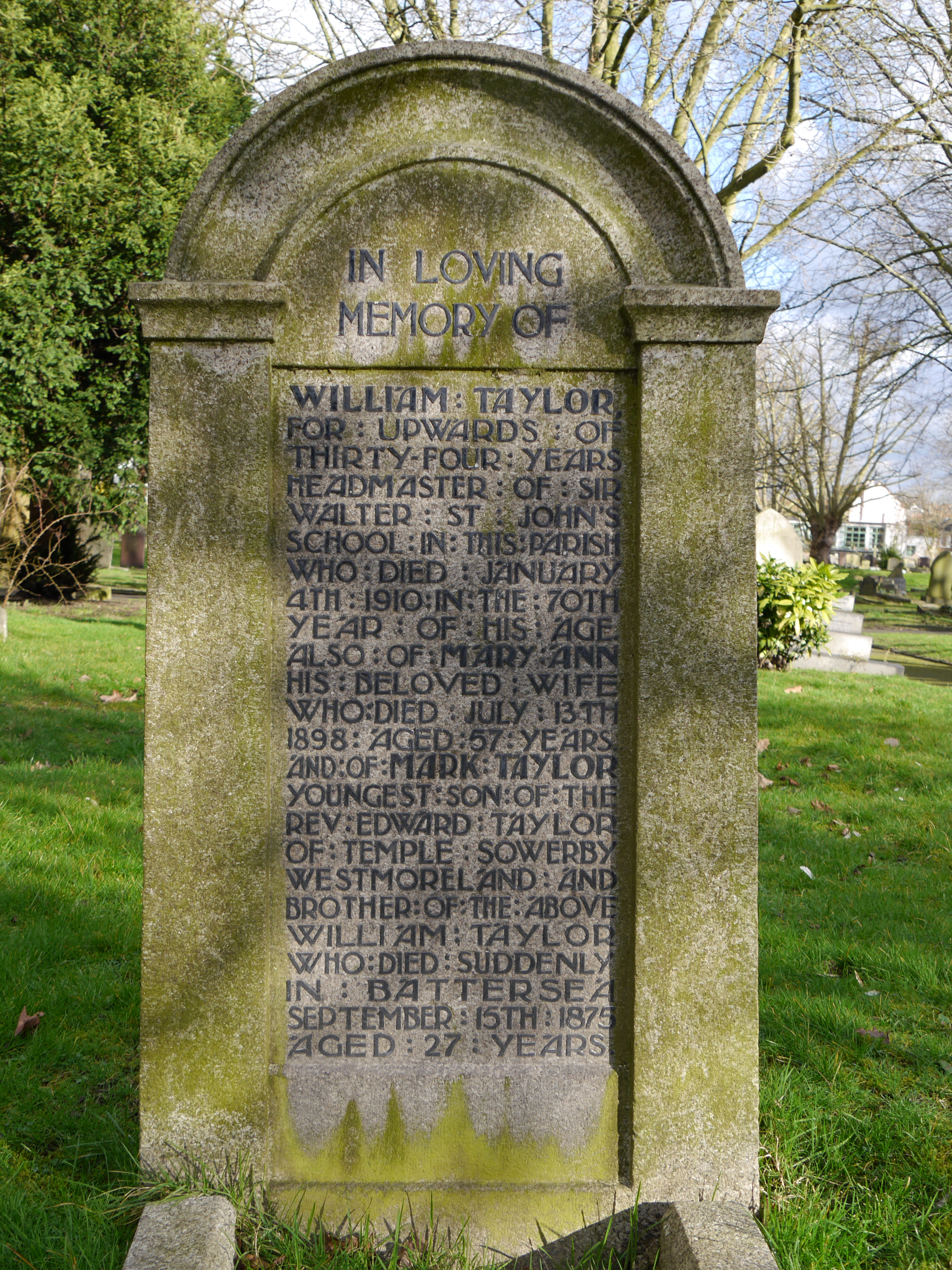
Funerary monument, St. Mary's Cemetery, Wandsworth

William Taylor (1840 - 4 January 1910) was a British educator, headmaster of Sir Walter St John's Grammar School For Boys for 34 years from 1873-1907.

He was the son of the Rev Edward Taylor, vicar of Temple Sowerby, Westmoreland.

Taylor had already been headmaster of St James's Boys School, Clapham, when he was appointed in 1873. When he retired in 1907, he was succeeded by his son John George Taylor, who was head from 1907–32, then by his grandson John Edward Taylor in 1932–46, until he was appointed head of Bedford Modern School, a post he held from 1946-65.

He is buried at St. Mary's Cemetery, Wandsworth.
