= William L. Taylor =

American lawyer

William Lewis Taylor
- Born: October 4, 1931; Brooklyn, New York, United States
- Died: June 28, 2010 (aged 78); Bethesda, Maryland
- Education: Brooklyn College, Yale Law School, LL.B.
- Occupation: Attorney
- Known for: Civil rights advocate
- Spouse: Harriett Elaine Rosen

William Lewis Taylor (October 4, 1931 – June 28, 2010) was a Jewish-American attorney, lobbyist and activist who advocated on behalf of African Americans during the Civil Rights Movement and played a major role in drafting civil rights legislation.

== Early life and education ==
Taylor was born in Crown Heights, Brooklyn, where he was harassed by his anti-Semitic Italian neighbors, later recalling of his youth that "I remember being pushed around as a kid and being called a 'Christ killer'". In speeches over the years he said that as a Jewish teenager he had experienced anti-Semitism in a neighborhood that Jews shared mainly with Italians. He first became aware of anti-African American prejudice when he saw whites harassing Jackie Robinson, when he stepped over the baseball color line while playing for the Brooklyn Dodgers.

Taylor attended Brooklyn College, where he was editor of the school paper but was suspended by the college's president for publishing an article that alleged that a professor had been declined tenure based on his political views. College president Harry D. Gideonse ordered the paper closed after two issues, believing the paper to be Communist-influenced, telling Taylor that "I hate to ruin anyone's career, but in your case, I'm prepared to make an exception." A decade after he graduated from the college in 1952, officials at the college implored federal officials not to hire him for a government job, saying that he had "espoused liberal causes such as the rights of the Negro in the South". Brooklyn College awarded Taylor an honorary degree in 2001, with college president Christoph M. Kimmich calling Taylor "a person who represents what this institution is all about".

In 1954, he earned his LL.B. degree from Yale Law School. He later taught at Columbus School of Law of The Catholic University of America, Georgetown University Law Center and at Stanford Law School.

During the 1950s, Taylor was a successful contestant on the Tic-Tac-Dough game show, where he had been offered answers by the producers, which he refused to accept. After appearing before a grand jury investigation of cheating on quiz shows, the jury foreman informed him that he had been the most successful of any of the show's contestants who had not cheated.

== Legal career ==
Taylor worked with Thurgood Marshall at the NAACP Legal Defense and Educational Fund, assisting in civil rights cases that arose in the wake of the United States Supreme Court's 1954 decision in Brown v. Board of Education. After the Little Rock, Arkansas school board decided to end a desegregation program in 1958, Taylor wrote a brief that convinced the court to require the continued integration of its schools.

He served as general counsel, and later as staff director, at the United States Commission on Civil Rights during the 1960s, where his research helped lead to the Civil Rights Act of 1964, the Voting Rights Act of 1965, and the Fair Housing Act of 1968. There he helped formulate a voluntary desegregation plan in the 1980s for the St. Louis, Missouri school system. With United States District Court Judge William L. Hungate threatening to impose a mandate to combine the St. Louis and St. Louis County public school systems, Taylor was able to avert the threat by offering an interdistrict transfer program that the city and county districts agreed to voluntarily.

As vice chairman of the Leadership Conference on Civil and Human Rights starting in 1982, Taylor helped revise civil rights legislation. He headed a team of lawyers that wrote a 75-page report early in the Presidency of Ronald Reagan, criticizing the administration's interpretations of civil rights law. He was credited with developing the strategy by which liberal organizations recruited law professors to testify against Reagan's nomination of Robert Bork to the United States Supreme Court, which ultimately failed in the United States Senate. Ralph Neas, who chaired the Block Bork coalition recounted how Taylor's team "examined every article, every speech, every decision, every statement that Robert Bork ever made", providing the supporting material that blocked Bork's path to nomination.

He helped draft the 2002 legislation for the No Child Left Behind Act, to increase the quality of education by monitoring student performance on standardized tests. Former Secretary of Education Margaret Spellings described Taylor as "a huge champion for closing the achievement gap, for accountability".

== Personal and family ==
A resident of Washington, D.C., Taylor died at age 78 on June 28, 2010, at Suburban Hospital in Bethesda, Maryland due to fluid in his lungs, the result of a head injury he suffered in an accidental fall one month before his death. He was survived by a son, two daughters, and three grandchildren. In 1954, he married Harriett Elaine Rosen, who died in 1997.

Taylor's personal papers and archives were given to the Library of Congress and to The George Washington University.
