= Maritime London =

Maritime London logo

Maritime London is a not for profit trade association for companies that provide professional services to the international shipping industry. The chief executive is Mark Williams, a former employee of HSBC and a member of the Institute of Chartered Shipbrokers.

Maritime London runs a scholarship scheme, MLOCS, to allow young people to train to become Merchant Navy officers.
