= Lisa Rajan =

British author

Councillor for Southwark London Borough Council
- In office 2 May 2002 – 9 June 2016
- Ward: Surrey Docks
- Succeeded by: Dan Whitehead

Personal details
- Born: Lisa Rajan; 1972 (age 53–54)
- Education: Imperial College
- Occupation: Author
- Website: lisarajan.com

Lisa Rajan (born 1972) is a children's author and former politician. She has written 30 books in the Tara Binns and Dani Binns series published by Collins Publishing, and two other titles also published by HarperCollins.

== Early life ==
Rajan lives in South London and studied at Imperial College. She has a BSc in biotechnology and an MSc in Science Communication.

She has worked in scientific research, scientific publishing, medical copywriting and was a writer for the New Scientist. She was previously an elected member on Southwark Council.

== Career ==
=== Politician ===
Between 2002 and 2016, Rajan was a Liberal Democrat councillor for Southwark London Borough Council, representing the ward of Surrey Docks.

At the 2002 local election, Rajan was elected as a Liberal Democrat councillor for Southwark London Borough Council, representing the ward of Surrey Docks. During her time on the council, she served as a cabinet member for Environment and Transport and then Children's Services and Education.

On 24 May 2021, Rajan was made an Honorary Alderwoman of Southwark recognising her service to the council.

=== Author ===
Rajan has written 32 books published by Harper Collins.

== Bibliography ==
=== Tara Binns series ===
Title	Date	Publisher	ISBN
High-Flying Pilot	2019	Harper Collins	ISBN 978-0-00-830656-4
Double-Quick Doctor	2019	Harper Collins	ISBN 978-0-00-830657-1
Big Idea Engineer	2019	Harper Collins	ISBN 978-0-00-830658-8
Bright-spark Scientist	2019	Harper Collins	ISBN 978-0-00-830659-5
Trail-blazing Astronaut	2019	Harper Collins	ISBN 978-0-00-830660-1
Ground-breaking Fossil Hunter	2019	Harper Collins	ISBN 978-0-00-830661-8
Vigilant Vet	2020	Harper Collins	ISBN 978-0-00-837328-3
Intrepid Inventor	2020	Harper Collins	ISBN 978-0-00-837329-0
Daring Diver	2020	Harper Collins	ISBN 978-0-00-837330-6
Mighty Mountain Ranger	2020	Harper Collins	ISBN 978-0-00-837331-3
Creative Coder	2020	Harper Collins	ISBN 978-0-00-837332-0
Clued-up Detective	2020	Harper Collins	ISBN 978-0-00-837333-7
Deep-sea Explorer	2022	Harper Collins	ISBN 978-0-00-848724-9
Eco-energy Expert	2022	Harper Collins	ISBN 978-0-00-848722-5
Futuristic Physicist	2022	Harper Collins	ISBN 978-0-00-848725-6
Micro-mystery Solver	2022	Harper Collins	ISBN 978-0-00-848721-8
Roving Robotics Genius	2022	Harper Collins	ISBN 978-0-00-848723-2
Visionary Volcanologist	2022	Harper Collins	ISBN 978-0-00-848726-3

=== Dani Binns series ===
Title	Date	Publisher	ISBN
Brilliant Builder	2020	Harper Collins	ISBN 978-0-00-838182-0
Clever Chef	2020	Harper Collins	ISBN 978-0-00-838183-7
Fearless Firefighter	2020	Harper Collins	ISBN 978-0-00-838184-4
Practical Paramedic	2020	Harper Collins	ISBN 978-0-00-838185-1
Fix-it Farmer	2020	Harper Collins	ISBN 978-0-00-838186-8
Talented Train Driver	2020	Harper Collins	ISBN 978-0-00-838187-5
Fair-play Footballer	2020	Harper Collins	ISBN 978-0-00-838188-2
Promising Police Officer	2020	Harper Collins	ISBN 978-0-00-838189-9
Amazing Architect	2022	Harper Collins	ISBN 978-0-00-848719-5
Dazzling Dentist	2022	Harper Collins	ISBN 978-0-00-848717-1
Heroic Helicopter Pilot	2022	Harper Collins	ISBN 978-0-00-848720-1
Problem-solving Plumber	2022	Harper Collins	ISBN 978-0-00-848718-8

=== Other books ===
Title	Date	Publisher	ISBN
Exploring Cyberspace	2022	Harper Collins	ISBN 978-0-00-847625-0
And Now Nobody Likes Me	2023	Harper Collins	ISBN 978-0-00-855347-0
