= William Mackergo Taylor =

American Congregational minister (1829-1895)

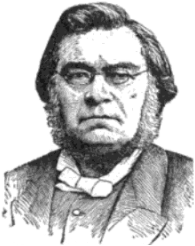
- Born: October 23, 1829; Kilmarnock, Ayrshire, Scotland
- Died: February 8, 1895 (aged 65); New York, New York, United States
- Burial place: Woodlawn Cemetery
- Education: University of Glasgow
- Occupations: Clergyman, writer

William Mackergo Taylor (1829–1895) was an American Congregational minister

== Biography ==
=== Career ===
William Mackergo Taylor was born at Kilmarnock, Ayrshire, Scotland on October 23, 1829. He graduated at the University of Glasgow (1849), and at the divinity hall of the United Presbyterian Church, Edinburgh (1852).

He was pastor of churches in Britain till 1872 (for 17 years one in Liverpool). He entered the United States where he became pastor of the Broadway Tabernacle (Congregational), in New York till 1893 when a paralytic stroke caused his retirement.

=== Writings ===
He wrote biographies of Rev. Matthew Dickie (1872) and John Knox (1885) and published numerous volumes of sermons and discourses, of which those of a biographical character on Joseph, Moses, David, Elijah, Daniel, and Paul were very popular. He lectured at Yale in 1876 and at Princeton in 1880. He also published The Scottish Pulpit from the Reformation to the Present Day (1887).

=== Death ===
Taylor died in New York City on February 8, 1895, and was buried at Woodlawn Cemetery.

== Publications ==
- The Life of Our Lord in the Words of the Four Evangelists
- David, King of Israel: His Life and its Lessons (1875)
- Peter the Apostle (1877)
- Daniel the Beloved (1878)
- Moses the Law-Giver (1879)
- The Gospel Miracles in their relation to Christ and Christianity (1880)
- Joseph the Prime Minister (1886)
- The Scottish Pulpit from the Reformation to the Present Day (1887)
- Elijah the Prophet (1903)
