= Alex Bain-Stewart =

British politician

Alex Bain-Stewart (born October 1944) is a councilman of the City of London Corporation where he represents the ward of Farringdon Within. He has an MSc in engineering from the University of Hertfordshire and is a Justice of the Peace. He is a member of the Worshipful Company of Gold and Silver Wyre Drawers.
