= William Carey Taylor =

English Baptist minister

- Born: September 30, 1886; Mayfield
- Died: March 18, 1971; Louisville
- Education: Southwestern Baptist Theological Seminary
- Occupations: Missionary, university teacher

William Carey Taylor (September 30, 1886, in Mayfield, Kentucky – March 18, 1971) was an American Baptist minister and missionary for a longtime in Brazil, and a Professor of Greek New Testament and related subjects in the Baptist Theological Seminary of Rio de Janeiro.

== Life ==
While living in Louisville, Kentucky, he belonged to Walnut Street Baptist Church.

He received his B.A. degree from Bethel College and completed his Th.M. and Th.D. at Southwestern Baptist Theological Seminary in Ft. Worth, Texas.

Taylor was a Southern Baptist missionary in Brazil by the Foreign Mission Board of the Southern Baptist Convention for 41 years (1915 to 1956). He worked primarily as an educator in Brazil, serving as President and Dean of the North Brazil Seminary in Recife, Brazil. After leaving the mission field in Brazil, he resided in Louisville, Kentucky.

Taylor died at the age of 84 at his home at the Berkeley Hotel, 664 S. Fourth.

== Works ==
He was author of 28 books on theology.

- Introdução ao estudo do Novo Testamento grego (in Portuguese). Casa Publ. Batista. 1960.
  - Introdução ao estudo no Novo Testamento grego: dicionário (in Portuguese). Rio de Janeiro: JUERP. 1978.
- Dicionário do Novo Testamento Grego (in Portuguese). JUERP. 1991. OCLC 46607510.
  - Dicionário do NT grego (in Portuguese). Rio de Janeiro–RJ: Juerp. 2001.
- The New Bible, Pro and Con (in Portuguese). New York: Vantage Press. 1955. OCLC 3351159.

== Sources ==
- Martin, Frankie (1959). Biography of Dr. W. C. Taylor, Missionary to Brazil. OCLC 20322325.
- Inventory to the William Carey Taylor Letters. AR 703 (PDF). Southern Baptist Historical Library and Archives. 2018.
- Hall, Taffey; Gateley, Stephen; Collins, Connie; League, Bev (2018). "William Carey Taylor Letters". Southern Baptist Historical Library & Archives.
- William Carey Taylor (1886 – 1971). Batisma Biblico.
- "William Carey. Father of modern Protestant missions". Christianity Today. 2023.
