= Hot Springs, Washington =

Ghost town in Washington (state)

- Ghost town
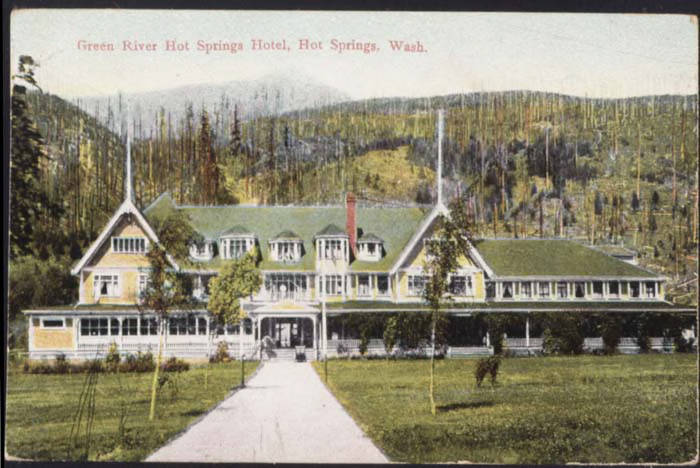
- Hotel at Hot Springs, circa 1910.

- Location in Washington and the United States Hot Springs (the United States)
- Coordinates: 47°12′17″N 121°32′47″W
- Country: United States
- State: Washington
- County: King
- Settled: 1886
- Elevation: 1,512 ft (461 m)

Population (1913-14)
  - Total: 65
- Time zone: UTC-8 (Pacific (PST))
  - Summer (DST): UTC-7 (PDT)
- GNIS feature ID: 1520981

Hot Springs is a ghost town in King County, Washington, United States. Properly Green River Hot Springs, the town was first settled under the name Kendon by the Northern Pacific Railway in 1886. Hot Springs was at one time home to a large sanatorium built around the natural hot springs in the area, and by 1907–1908 had a population of 225 with two doctors. The sanatorium was reported to have been an impressive facility, having nice suites, bowling alleys and pool tables. A 1904 envelope has a return address, "The Kloeber, J. S. Kloeber, M.D. Green River Hot Springs, Wash.". The area was also home to Harvey Dean's mill (which gave the nearby town of Lester, Washington its original name). By 1913–14 the town's population had dropped to 65, with no businesses mentioned. Evidence points to the fact that sometime before 1913–14 the sanatorium had burned down. By 1918, the town had virtually vanished, only being listed as a "Discontinued Post Office."

== Geography ==
Hot Springs is located east of Enumclaw and just west of Lester, along the Green River and BNSF Railway line. Its elevation is 1512 feet (460m) above sea level.
