= Bill Taylor (Australian footballer) =

Australian rules footballer

Personal information
- Full name: William Taylor
- Born: 2 June 1902
- Died: 27 October 1978 (aged 76)
- Original team: Golden Point
- Height: 188 cm (6 ft 2 in)
- Weight: 99 kg (218 lb)

Playing career^{1}
Years	Club	Games (Goals)
1926	Geelong	8 (10)
- ^{1} Playing statistics correct to the end of 1926.

William Taylor (2 June 1902 – 27 October 1978) was an Australian rules footballer who played with Geelong in the Victorian Football League (VFL).

Taylor grew up on his parents farm outside Smeaton, Victoria. Being a tall lad he started playing football with the local side, Smeaton. After four years he transferred to Golden Point in the Ballarat league.

During the annual Geelong district versus Ballarat district charity match he was noticed by Geelong recruiters.

Moving to Geelong where he trained to be a wool classer, Taylor had ankle issues that restricted his only season in the VFL. Tall for the era, Taylor could play at both ends of the ground. He could also ruck. He was a fine mark and a long kick of the football.

He left Geelong under a cloud after being left off the club's training list.
