= Bill Taylor (businessman) =

- Citizenship: American
- Education: Princeton University (BA); MIT Sloan School of Management (MBA)
- Occupations: Co-founder, Fast Company

William C. Taylor is co-founder and editor of Fast Company Magazine, with Alan Webber. He is a former editor of the Harvard Business Review. He is an adjunct professor at Babson College and wrote a column in the Money section of The Guardian newspaper.

Taylor received his B.A. from Princeton University and his M.B.A. from the MIT Sloan School of Management.
