= Will Taylor (rugby union) =

Welsh rugby player (born 1991)

- Born: William Rhys Taylor; 4 March 1991 (age 35) Swansea, Wales
- Height: 1.88 m (6 ft 2 in)
- Weight: 118 kg (18 st 8 lb)
- School: Olchfa Comprehensive School

Rugby union career
Senior career
Years	Team	Apps	(Points)
2010-11	Swansea RFC	18	(0)
2011-12	Aberavon RFC	23	(0)
2012-2015	Wasps	39	(5)
2015-16	Carmarthen Quins	10	(0)
2016-	Llanelli RFC	3	(0)
- Correct as of 10 January 2017
Provincial / State sides
Years	Team	Apps	(Points)
2009-12	Ospreys	3	(0)
2015-	Scarlets	5	(0)
- Correct as of 10 January 2017
International career
Years	Team	Apps	(Points)
2009-11	Wales U20	14	(0)
- Correct as of 24 February 2016

Will Taylor (born 4 March 1991) is a Welsh rugby union player. A prop forward, he plays club rugby for Wasps having previously played for the Ospreys regional team.

On 25 March 2015, Taylor returns home as he signed for Welsh region Scarlets ahead of the 2015/16 season.
