= Billy Taylor (footballer, born 1939) =

Scottish footballer

Personal information
- Full name: William Taylor
- Date of birth: 31 July 1939
- Place of birth: Edinburgh, Scotland
- Date of death: 30 November 1981 (aged 42)
- Position: Midfielder

Senior career*
Years	Team	Apps	(Gls)
–	Bonnyrigg Rose Athletic		
1960–1963	Leyton Orient	23	(0)
1963–1969	Nottingham Forest	20	(1)
1969–1971	Lincoln City	79	(6)
- * Club domestic league appearances and goals

William Taylor (31 July 1939 – 30 November 1981) was a Scottish footballer who played for junior club Bonnyrigg Rose Athletic before moving to England, where he made 122 appearances in the Football League playing for Leyton Orient, Nottingham Forest and Lincoln City. He then joined the coaching staff at Fulham. He played as a midfielder.
