= Will Taylor (land speculator) =

American land speculator

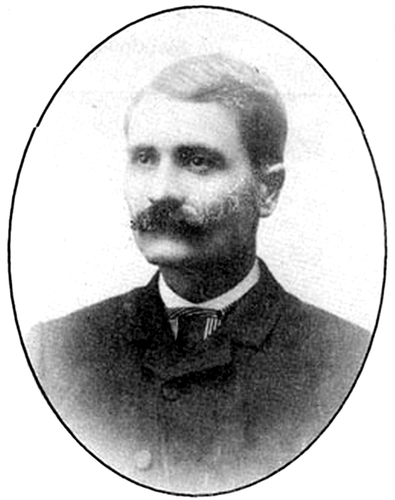
William Taylor (1853-1941) founder of North Bend, Washington

William Taylor (1853–1941) was a pioneer, Snoqualmie Valley driving force and the founder of North Bend, Washington in February 1889.

William H. Taylor was born in Iowa on February 12, 1853 to a large mid-western family. In 1872 at the age of 19, his family moved to the Snoqualmie Valley where William took a cooks assistant job at the Newcastle Coal Mine cookhouse, near Issaquah. Later, he relocated to Fall City to help clear land and worked as logger near the mouth of the Skykomish River.

Like most pioneers, he found work wherever he could and later returned to the upper Snoqualmie Valley to work as cabin builder, logger and general laborer for Lucinda Fares and her uncle Jeremiah Borst, known as the "Father of the Snoqualmie Valley".

In 1876, he moved to California to take work as a miner. After receiving a work offer from Borst, he married Molly Beard and they returned north to work on Borst's farm for six years. They built their own home, a popular boarding house and trading post for travelers over the Snoqualmie Pass. As a family, they raised six children, but in the 1890s the Taylors separated. William later remarried valley resident Ella Hyman, who was a widow with one daughter.

From 1888 to 1891, Taylor served as county commissioner and was instrumental in building many of the bridges over the rivers and streams that cut through the Snoqualmie Valley.

On February 16, 1889, with the upcoming railroad boom, Taylor formally platted a town including his farm, upcoming street plans and building lots, giving it the name Snoqualmie. Later that summer competing Seattle land speculators subsequently platted nearby Snoqualmie Falls choosing a similar name. Pressured by demands of the Seattle, Lake Shore and Eastern Railway to avoid confusion, Taylor reluctantly renamed his town Mountain View. However, the United States Post Office Department objected to Mountain View as a town already existed in northern Whatcom County. To conclude the matter Taylor agreed to permanently rename his settlement North Bend after its prime location near the large northward bend of the South Fork of the Snoqualmie River. Taylor was proud of his new, thriving town, but by historical accounts "He never got over having his town name taken away".

Throughout his remaining years Taylor served on the Snoqualmie Valley school board, operated a general store, cleared an abundance of valley land and built many homes. He was also an early conservationist who planted trees to replace those he felled. In 1931, at the age of 76, he helped build a trail up Mount Si, which was dedicated as the William H. Taylor Memorial Trail by his friend the regional historian Edmund Meany. A hard-working man, he lived to the age of 88, long enough to see the settlement he founded grow into a vibrant community. Taylor died on January 9, 1941, and was buried at the foot of Mount Si.
