= Will Taylor (baseball) =

American football player (born 2003)

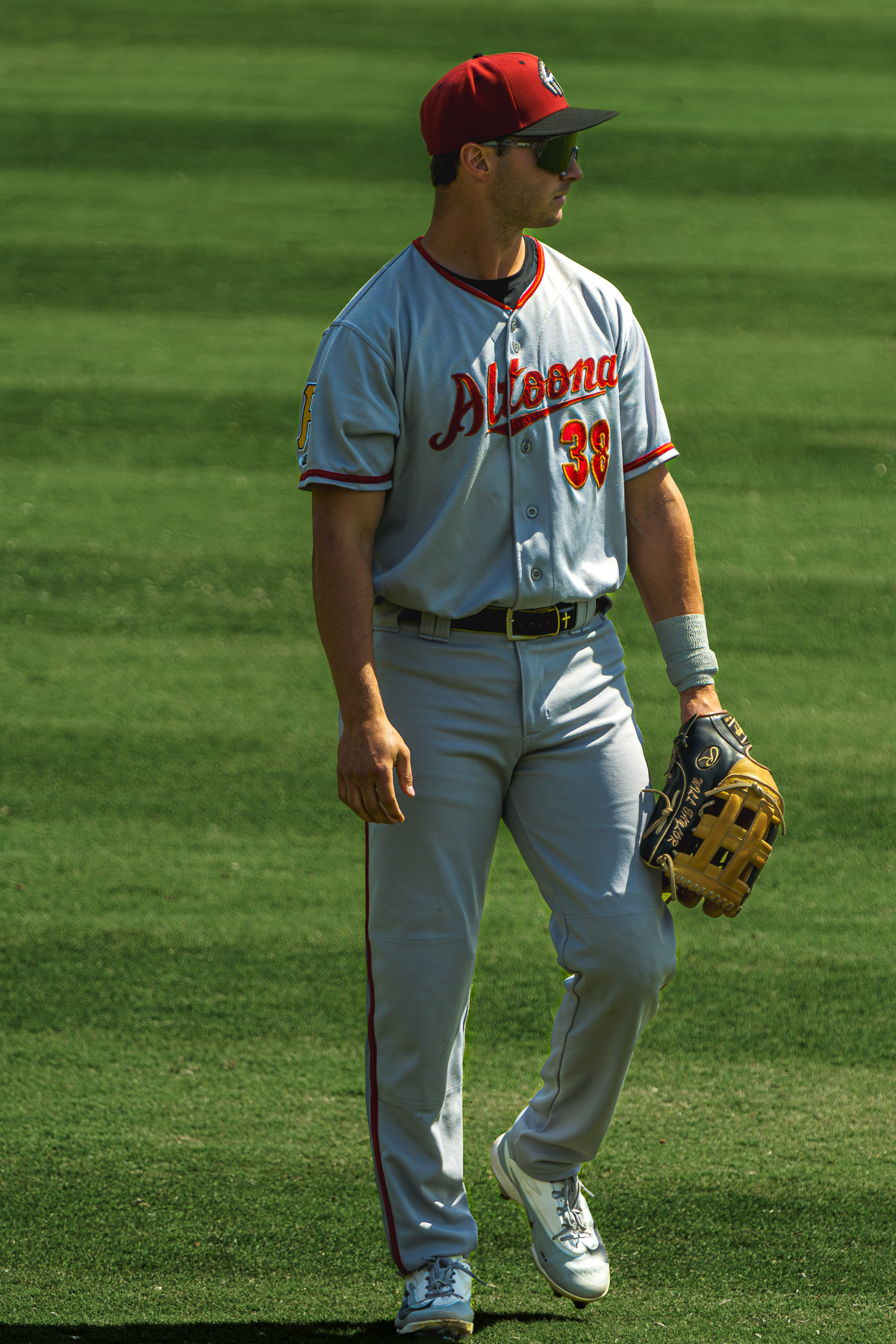
- Taylor in 2026

Pittsburgh Pirates
- Outfielder
- Born: January 10, 2003 (age 23); Columbia, South Carolina U.S.
- Bats: Right Throws: Right
- Stats at Baseball Reference

William Edward Taylor (born January 10, 2003) is an American professional baseball outfielder in the Pittsburgh Pirates organization. He previously played quarterback and wide receiver for the Clemson football team.

== Early life ==
Taylor grew up in Irmo, South Carolina and originally attended Ben Lippen School in Columbia, South Carolina, where he played baseball and football. He batted .432 with 38 hits in his sophomore baseball season. Taylor passed for 1,647 yards while also rushing for 1,549 yards as a junior. Taylor transferred to Dutch Fork High School in his hometown prior to his senior year. He completed 136-of-203 passes for 2,237 yards and 21 touchdowns with four interceptions and gained 448 rushing yards with 11 touchdowns on 60 carries as Dutch Fork won the Class 5A state championship. In his senior baseball season, Taylor batted .450 with seven home runs, 33 RBIs and 34 runs scored and was named the South Carolina Gatorade Player of the Year. Taylor committed to play college baseball at Clemson during his junior year at the Ben Lippen School and pledged to also play football at the school during his senior football season.

Taylor was considered a potential first round selection in the 2021 MLB draft. He was selected in the 19th round by the Texas Rangers after he stated his desire to play football at Clemson and opted not to sign.

== College career ==
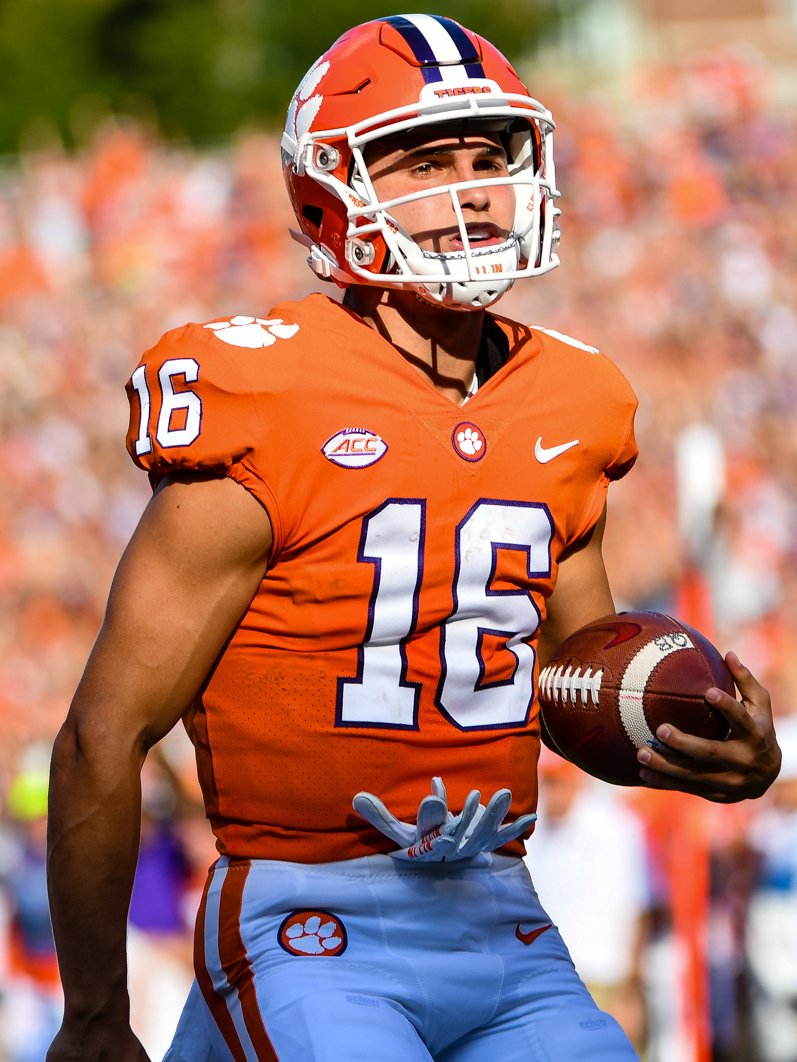
Taylor playing football for Clemson in 2021

Taylor entered Clemson as a quarterback with the expectation that he would move to the wide receiver position after his freshman season. He was named the Tigers' primary punt returner going into the 2021 season. Taylor received significant playing time for the first time on September 11, 2021, in a 49–3 win against South Carolina State, rushing for 20 yards and returning three punts for 53 yards. Taylor suffered a season-ending knee injury in the Tigers' fifth game of the season against Boston College.

Taylor missed the beginning of his freshman baseball season due to his knee injury. He began playing with the team in May. Taylor finished the season with a .260 batting average and 14 runs scored in 13 games played. After the season, he played collegiate summer baseball with the Greeneville Flyboys of the Appalachian League.

Taylor played in ten games during his sophomore football season and caught five passes for 16 yards and one touchdown and returned ten punts for 20 yards as the Tigers won the 2022 ACC Championship Game. He missed four games after suffering a minor knee injury. In baseball, Taylor batted 362 with 79 hits, 16 doubles, five home runs, 46 RBIs and 11 stolen bases and became the first Clemson athlete to win ACC championships in football and baseball in the same academic year since 1989. During the following summer, Taylor announced he would be giving up football to focus solely on baseball going into his junior year.

In 2023, he played collegiate summer baseball with the Hyannis Harbor Hawks of the Cape Cod Baseball League.

== Professional career ==
Taylor was drafted by Pittsburgh Pirates in the 5th round, with the 145th overall selection, of the 2024 Major League Baseball draft. He signed with the Pirates on July 26, 2024, and received an overslot signing bonus of $500,000. Taylor was assigned to the Bradenton Marauders of the Single-A Florida State League to begin his professional career.
