= William Campbell-Taylor =

British politician and Church of England priest

The Reverend William Campbell-Taylor
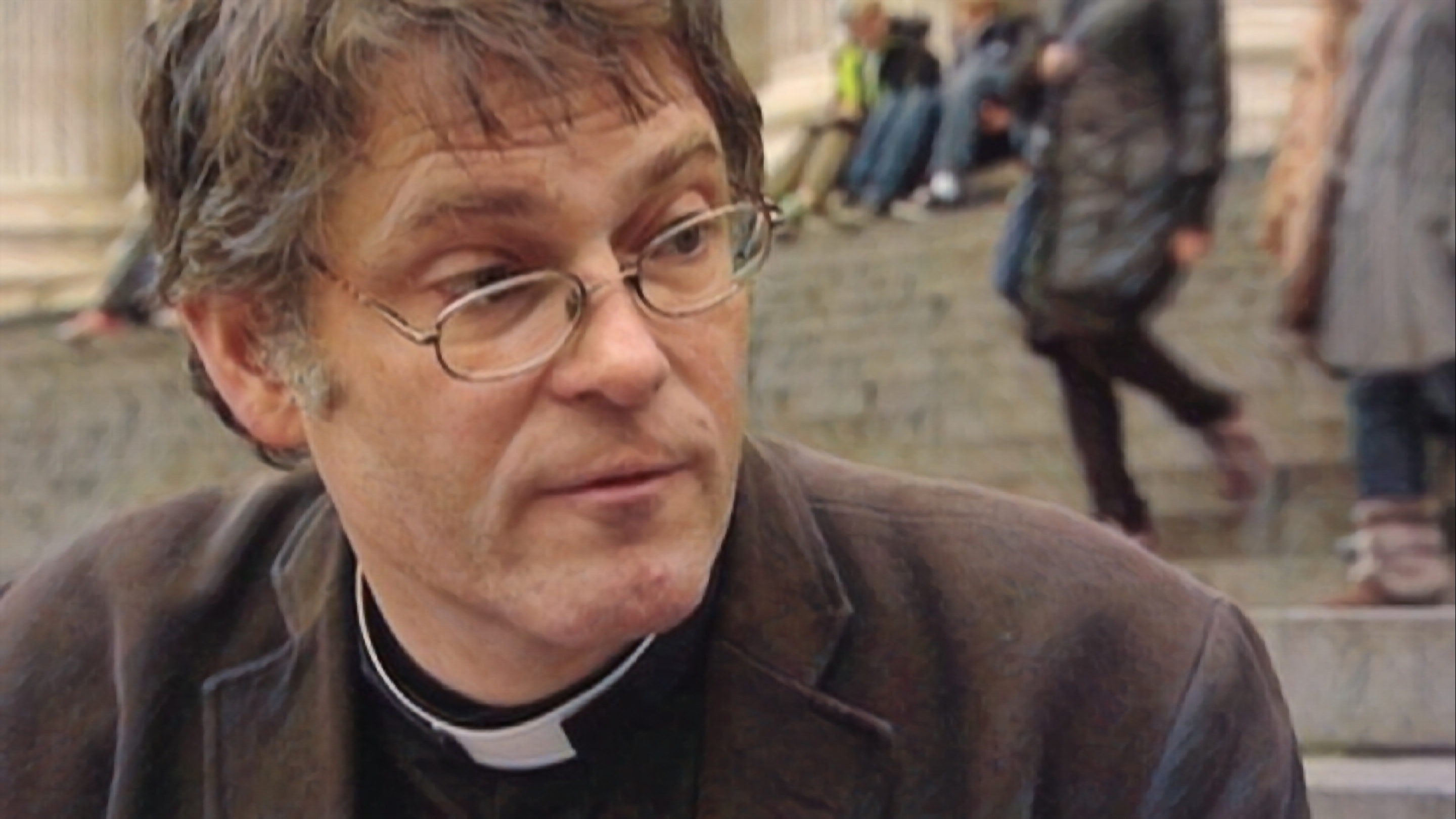

Councillor for Portsoken
- In office 20 March 2014 – 23 March 2017

Councillor
- In office 2001–2008

Personal details
- Born: William Goodacre Campbell-Taylor; 4 July 1965 (age 61) Woking, UK
- Party: Labour
- Children: 1 daughter (Harriet)
- Education: Westcott House, Cambridge
- Occupation: Priest

William Campbell-Taylor (also known by the alias William Taylor) is an Anglican priest, writer and former Labour Party councillor, currently serving as the vicar of St Thomas' Church in Clapton Common.

== Biography ==
Campbell-Taylor was born 7 April 1965 to barrister Francis Hunter Campbell-Taylor (1915-1969) and his wife Jeanie Goodacre. He has a brother called Rod and a daughter called Harriet. His paternal grandfather was a Presbyterian minister from the north-east Scottish Highlands whereas his maternal grandfather Reverend John Goodacre, vicar of All Saints, Hanley and the fifth generation of Anglican priests in his family, served with the 59th division of the North Staffordshire Regiment in France and Ireland (where he met his wife) as a military chaplain, later earning the Military Cross for his service. His maternal grandmother, Winnifred Purefoy, was born in Dublin to Revd. Amyrald Dancer Purefoy, vicar of Chapelizod, Dublin from 1889, and of French descent. Through his mother he claims descent from Matthew Young who was Bishop of Clonfert and Kilmacduagh for the last two years of his life. Following the death of his father by heart attack his mother remarried the artist Charles Longbotham (1917-1999) in 1979. In 1991 whilst in training for the priesthood at Westcott House, Cambridge, he was suspended after it was discovered that his girlfriend at the time was pregnant with his daughter (Harriet). His case was referred to the Bishop of Oxford, who eventually allowed him to return to his studies but without the guarantee of ordination.

In 2001 he released an autobiography This bright field : a travel book in one place detailing his early life and journey to the priesthood.

== Politics ==
In October 2002, Campbell-Taylor along with Maurice Glasman challenged the City of London (ward elections) Bill during its third hearing in the House of Lords, which heavily expanded business voting within the elections of the City of London Corporation. In 2012 he cofounded the City Reform Group, a "coalition of thinktanks, faith groups and City businesses" with the goal of reforming the transparency and accountability of the City of London Corporation.

In 2014 he made history when he became the first ever party politician to win a seat on the City of London's Common Council, standing as a Labour candidate in a by-election in the ward of Portsoken, controversially breaking the tradition of Aldermen and Councilmen in the financial capital standing as non-party political independents. He stood down as a Common Councilman in March 2017 at the end of his time in office. In December 2017, Campbell-Taylor was defeated in the by-election for Alderman of Portsoken Ward by Prem Goyal with a margin of 228 to 143 votes. He previously was a councilman between 2001 and 2008.

Prior to the 2017 Aldermanic by-election for Portsoken, the City Matters website reports that flyers containing an article from the "orthodox anglican website virtueonline.org" were distributed to residents of the Middlesex Street Estate "accusing the Anglican priest of grooming 'a vulnerable male'" for sex and then attempting "to prosecute him for speaking out". The article states, "Mr Campbell-Taylor described the allegations as 'false' and 'defamatory'", though to date there is "no evidence" linking any individual to the flyers.

In 2021, the Editor of the Church of England Newspaper published an article which states that a legal complainant of clergy sexual abuse under the Clergy Discipline Measure 2003 (CDM) had "been subjected to a campaign of harassment and bullying since he reported an indecent assault by a London clergyman" and that "he has now lodged CDM complaints against Bishop Sarah Mullally and the Rev William Campbell-Taylor". In a follow-up article concerning the release by artists Liam Ó Maonlaí and Steve Cooney of a music video about the case, the Editor of the Church of England Newspaper writes, "My article revealed that a legal complaint of clergy abuse filed with a Clergy Discipline Measure, was shockingly leaked by a Bishop to the alleged abuser".

In 2026, Gabriella Swerling, Religious Affairs Editor of The Daily Telegraph reported, "A second victim was allegedly targeted by a priest accused of sexual assault, in a scandal engulfing the incoming Archbishop of Canterbury. The second victim, a Church of England clergy member whom The Telegraph is referring to as Survivor O, claims that the priest confronted them, while fully naked, and sexually propositioned them". The article directly quotes the victim, Survivor O: "A number of years ago, I visited the priest at the centre of the allegations made more recently in 2020. He made an unwanted sexual proposition towards me". The Daily Telegraph states, "A Diocese of London spokesman has alerted the Diocesan Safeguarding Team to the case of Survivor O".

In 2023 he revealed that most of his congregation were from Africa or the Caribbean despite two of the five original trustees of his parish being slave owners and called for further forensic investigation into the founding sources of income for said parish.

== Bibliography ==
- Taylor, William (2001). This Bright Field : A Travel Book in One Place (1st ed.). London: Methuen Publishing. ISBN 978-041374690-0.
