= Newfield Secondary School =

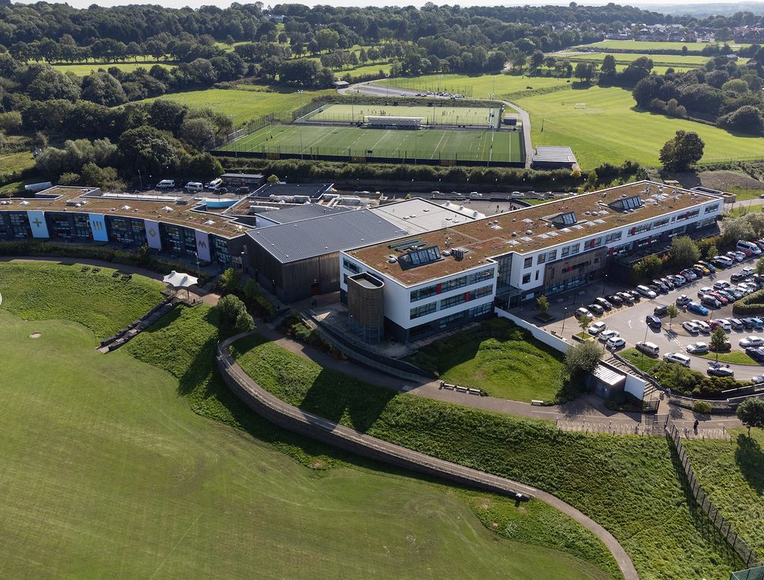

Location
- Lees Hall Road; Sheffield, South Yorkshire, S8 9JP; England; 53.34683°N 1.46066°W

Information
- Type: Academy
- Motto: Achievement Leads to Opportunity and Choice
- Department for Education URN: 140821 Tables
- Ofsted: Reports
- Chair: S Chew
- Staff: 103
- Gender: Mixed
- Age: 11 to 16
- Enrolment: 1200
- Website: www.newfield.sheffield.sch.uk

Newfield Secondary School is a coeducational secondary school with academy status for 11–16-year-old children, in the Norton Lees area of the city of Sheffield, South Yorkshire, England. There are approximately 1,000 students at the school.

In 2013 the school was sponsored to become an academy as part of its ongoing partnership with King Ecgbert School in Sheffield, with Lesley Bowes assuming the role of executive headteacher.

== Physical aspects of the school ==
Newfield shares its location with Talbot Specialist School, a school for students aged 11–19 with special educational needs, and Learn Sheffield.

The school has its own private drive from Lees Hall Road which leads on to the grounds. The school was originally split between two buildings, known as East Wing and West Wing, which were connected by a short driveway, but these buildings were demolished in the mid-2000s in preparation for the school's major remodel. Newfield is now contained in a single building, attached on one side to the Talbot building. To the right of the main building are the sports facilities, which including a large grass field, astroturf, and tennis courts.

=== New build ===
The school's rebuild, which began in summer 2007 and was completed in January 2009, brought new facilities so that the school, including a recording room, a gym with seats for spectators, and astroturf football pitches. A new purpose-built specialist school, the Talbot Specialist School, was also constructed as part of the rebuild; it is located on the lower field.

== Mercia Learning Trust ==
The original founding school was King Ecgbert 11-18 Secondary School in Dore, Sheffield, which was graded by Ofsted as Outstanding in 2013. Subsequently, a multi-academy partnership formed with Nether Edge and Totley feeder primary schools (both judged to be Outstanding by Ofsted in 2015), Further partnership with Newfield 11-16 Secondary School (judged to be Good by Ofsted in 2017) with Woodlands Primary School (formerly Valley Park Primary) joining soon after. In 2018 it was announced that the Mercia Learning Trust had secured funding to build a new secondary school in Sheffield, Mercia School. There are now a total of six schools within the trust.

All six schools work closely together and operate as an "Aligned Autonomy" (meaning that the schools operate individually but share common practice and policy.)

== Academic performance ==
The percentage of students achieving five or more A*–C grades at GCSE level (or equivalent) was 55% in 2011; 99% passed five or more GCSEs at any grade (A*–G), and 100% of all pupils achieved at least one qualification. When specifically including English and maths GCSEs, the percentage of students achieving five or more GCSEs at A*–C grade was 35% in 2011 (down from 44% in 2010). This compares with 49.4% for all secondary schools in the Sheffield local authority area, and 58.9% for England as a whole.

== Pupil demographics ==
Newfield is a broadly average-sized secondary school. The proportion of students known to be eligible for free school meals (21.6% in 2011) is in line with the national average. The proportion of students identified as having special educational needs and/or disabilities is above average, although the proportion with a statement of special educational needs is below the national average. The large majority of students are of White British heritage. The proportion of students from minority ethnic heritages is below average, and the proportion that speaks English as an additional language is well below average.

Overall pupil absence was reported as 8.9% in 2011, compared to a national average of 6.5%. Unauthorised absence was 5.7% (national average 1.4%).

== Ofsted inspections ==
In 2008 an Ofsted inspection report graded Newfield overall as Grade 4 ('inadequate'), resulting in special measures status being applied. Over the following two years, progress was made culminating in the special measures status being removed and the school being judged to be Grade 3 ('satisfactory') in the 2010 inspection. The next inspection, conducted in May 2017, saw the school received an inspection rating of 'good'. The most recent Ofsted inspection came in March 2022. The school was again judged to be 'Good', with notable references to the inclusivity of the school and the high standards at the school.

== Proposed changes to arts teaching ==
In 2025 the school announced that it would be reducing the number of Drama, Music, Design and Technology and Computing lessons, in order to increase teaching time for Maths and English, citing poor performance in those subjects as the justification. In response, in May 2025 students organised their own protests, staging a self-organised walkout; other protests included banners and gatherings outside the school.

== Headteachers ==
- Ruth Hollingsworth (2024-)
- Emma Anderson (2016–2024)
- Yeates (early 2010s)
- Sue Bains (2007–2009)
- Glenda Baker (until 2007)
- Ian Cockburn (1989)
- Peter Threlfall (1974–1989)
- Thraves (until 1974)
- Topliss (1960s)

== Notable former pupils ==
- Jeff Eckhardt, professional footballer with Sheffield United, Fulham F.C. and Cardiff City
- Ritchie Humphreys, professional footballer with Sheffield Wednesday, Hartlepool United, and Chesterfield, Chairman of the Professional Footballer's Association
- Ian Thomas, 51st Town Clerk of London and Chief Executive of the City of London Corporation
- Liam Waldock, professional footballer with Sheffield Wednesday.
- Jamie Yates, professional footballer with Rotherham United and Boston United
