= Henry Woodthorpe =

Henry Woodthorpe may refer to:

- Henry Woodthorpe Jr. (1780–1842), Town Clerk of London
- Henry Woodthorpe Sr. (1755–1825), his father, Town Clerk of London
