= James Bell (town clerk) =

English solicitor and town clerk

Sir James Bell CVO (26 March 1866 – 1 September 1937) was an English solicitor who served as Town Clerk of London for 33 years.

Bell was born in Preston, the son of a doctor, and was educated at Preston Grammar School and University College School in London. He was admitted a solicitor in 1888. In 1891 he was appointed Assistant Town Clerk of Birmingham and in 1894 he became Town Clerk of Leicester.

In May 1902 he was elected Town Clerk of the City of London from a large number of candidates. In this role he was chief executive of the Corporation of London. Bell conducted the Corporation's business rapidly and efficiently and did not expect his instructions to be debated by his subordinates. Nevertheless, he was highly respected by his staff, by the members of the Corporation, and by the businessmen of the City. He retired in 1935, having been persuaded not to by the Corporation every year since 1931.

Bell was knighted in 1911 and appointed Commander of the Royal Victorian Order (CVO) in the 1920 New Year Honours.

== Footnotes ==
Civic offices
Preceded by Sir John Monckton	Town Clerk of London; 1902–1935	Succeeded by Alfred Roach
