= City Remembrancer =

Chief Officer of the City of London Corporation

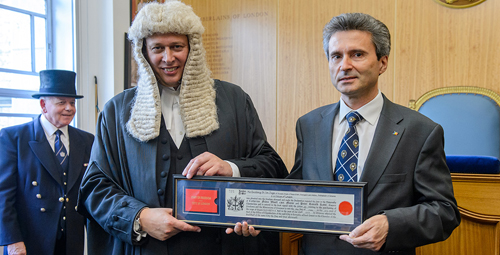
Paul Double (left) presenting Ion Jinga with the Freedom of the city, 13 June 2014

The Remembrancer is one of the City of London Corporation's Chief Officers; the role dates back to 1571. His traditional role is as the channel of communications between the Lord Mayor and the City of London on the one hand and the Sovereign, Royal Household and Parliament on the other. The Remembrancer is also the city's Ceremonial Officer and Chief of Protocol.

Since 2023, the Remembrancer has been Paul Wright.

== Origins ==
On 6 February 1571 the Corporation of the City of London created the office of Remembrancer, appointing Thomas Norton to the position. The record of the decision reads:

This daye Thomas Norton, Gent., is admytted to be Remembrauncer of this Cittye, accordinge to th' articles followinge, as was sworne officer according to the othe followinge.

He shall keepe all the Bookes of the Cittye, suche as to his custodie shall be delivered by indenture between M^{r.} Chamb^{lem}, M^{r.} Towne Clerk, and him.

All suche matters concerninge the Cittye as usually have been entred by ——, he shall cause to be entred and engrossed with convenyent spede. All the matters conteyned in the Bookes concerninge th' affayres of thee Cittye, w^{ch} Bookes shalbe in form aforesaid comytted to his custodie, he shall gather together and reduce the same into Indices, Tables, or Kalendars, wherby they may be more easily, readily, and orderly founded.

All like matters hereafter to be engrossed he shall likewise reduce into Tables, and so contynewe the same from tyme to tyme during his enjoyeinge th'office.

The said officer shalbe called the Remembrauncer of the Cittye, and shall have place next ——.

It is ordered that he shall not make any Copies of any bookes or Recordes of this Cittye, for that the same apperteynith to the Towne Clerk, and the foure Clerkes of the L. Maior's Court, nor shall not doe anythinge that shall or may be in any wise prejudiciall to th' office of the Towne Clerk, or entermeddle with the same.

The title 'remembrancer' was used for the office as it was responsible for keeping in remembrance the important affairs of the corporation – to act as the corporation's memory.

== Remembrancer's role and department ==
The Remembrancer's department at the City of London is broken into three distinct branches of work: parliamentary, ceremonial and private events. The parliamentary office is responsible for looking after the City of London's interests in Parliament with regard to all public legislation, and the ceremonial office's objectives are to enable the Lord Mayor and City of London to welcome high-profile visitors both domestically and internationally. Functions staged range from small receptions to major state dinners. Finally, the private events team co-ordinate the hiring of Guildhall for private banquets, receptions or conferences. The Remembrancer's department had a budget of £6 million in 2011, and employed six lawyers to scrutinise prospective legislation and give evidence to select committees.

=== Relationship with Parliament ===
The Remembrancer is a parliamentary agent and so can observe House of Commons proceedings from the under-gallery next to the entrance to the chamber reserved for visitors, near the chair of the Sergeant at Arms (the opposite end of the chamber from the Speaker's chair) and has no access beyond the bar of the house, which marks the area of the chamber where only MPs are allowed and visitors may not enter during sessions. The House of Commons Commission have stated that the Remembrancer does not have any access to the floor of the House of Commons.

Access to the under-gallery does not give any ability to participate in or influence the proceedings, and the Remembrancer has no access to sit in this area by right, but rather by permission of the Speaker extended to parliamentary agents.

The Corporation in general, and the Remembrancer in particular, have no power to overrule Parliament, which has the right to make legislation affecting the City. For example, the Corporation needed to request a local act of Parliament, the City of London (Ward Elections) Act 2002 (c. vi), to modernise its system of local elections; the act notes, "The objects of this Act cannot be attained without the authority of Parliament".

The Remembrancer does not have any entitlement to see parliamentary bills or other papers before they are publicly available, or to amend laws. The Remembrancer's responsibilities include monitoring legislation introduced into Parliament, and reporting to the Corporation anything that is likely to influence the City of London's interests. The Remembrancer also offers briefings to MPs and submits evidence when select committees are investigating matters of interest to the corporation, but does not have any special rights or privileges in this regard, having the same access as that of any other individual or body. The Remembrancer does not have any privileged access to view legislation during the drafting process, and is not even notified of public bills that impact the City, but is notified of the introduction of private bills that impact the City.

Despite statements to the contrary by the parliamentary and City authorities, beliefs persist that the Remembrancer has special access to or authority over the Commons, for example that they sit behind or near the Speaker, that the Remembrancer can access the floor of the Commons, that the Remembrancer can intervene in proceedings, or that the Remembrancer has special privileges to view draft legislation. For example, in an article in The Guardian in 2011 about the unreformed nature of the City of London Corporation, George Monbiot wrote:

The City of London is the only part of Britain over which parliament has no authority. In one respect at least the Corporation acts as the superior body: it imposes on the House of Commons a figure called the remembrancer: an official lobbyist who sits behind the Speaker's chair and ensures that, whatever our elected representatives might think, the City's rights and privileges are protected.

In a further example, in 2013 Green Party MP Caroline Lucas wrote to the Speaker of the House of Commons, John Bercow, asking him to consider removing the Remembrancer from the floor of the House of Commons, and to end privileges she claimed the Remembrancer had to view legislation during the drafting process.

== List of city remembrancers ==
List of city remembrancers
Term	City remembrancer
1571–1584 d.	Thomas Norton
1584–1587	no appointment (Note: On 21 July 1584 the Court of Aldermen decreed that nobody should be appointed to fill the position of Remembrancer following Norton's death "for that same was never before hys tyme any offyce and ys thought by thys Courte for to be needeles and superfluous.)
1587–1605	Giles Fletcher DCL (Note: Appointed at the request of Elizabeth I)
1605–1609	Clement Edmonds
1609–1619	William Dyos
1619–1633 d.	Robert Bacon
1633–1643	Thomas Wiseman
1643–1646	no appointment (Note: Remembrancer "discharged by the Court of Common Council, it being conceived an unnecessary charge to the City.")
1646–1647	Thomas Skinner
1647–1657 d.	William Pullen
1657–1659	John Hind
1659–1660	John Topham
1660–1662	John Wright
1662 (January–July)	Richard Lightfoot
1662–1664	John Lightfoot
1664–1665 d.	George Dalton
1665–1666	John Burrowes
1666–1667	Edward Manning
1667–1673	Richard Brawne
1673–1677	George Doe
1677–1681	Sir Richard Dearham (or Dearam)
1681–1696	Abraham Clarke (or Clerke)
1696–1698	John Sandsford
1698–1708	William Bellamy
1708–1719	John Johnson
1719–1727	John Preston
1727–1743	John Lethieullier
1743–1745	William Hamilton
1745–1760	Richard Cheslyn
1760–1761	Brass Crosby
1761–1793 d.	Peter Roberts
1793–1832 d.	Timothy Tyrrell
1832–1863	Edward Tyrrell
1864–1878	William Corrie
1878–1881	Charles Henry Robarts
1882–1903	Sir Gabriel Prior Goldney
1903–1913	Adrian Donald Wilde Pollock
1913–1927	Colonel Herbert Stuart Sankey
1927–1932	John Bridge Aspinall
1932–1953	Sir Leslie Blackmore Bowker
1953–1967	Sir Paul Christopher Davie
1968–1981	Sir Geoffrey Arden Peacock CVO
1981–1986	Anthony Douglas Howlett
1986–2003	Adrian Francis Patrick Barnes CVO
2003–2023	Paul Double CVO
2023–present	Paul Wright

== See also ==
- Remembrancer
- King's Remembrancer
