= John Carpenter (town clerk) =

Member of the Parliament of England

John Carpenter, the younger
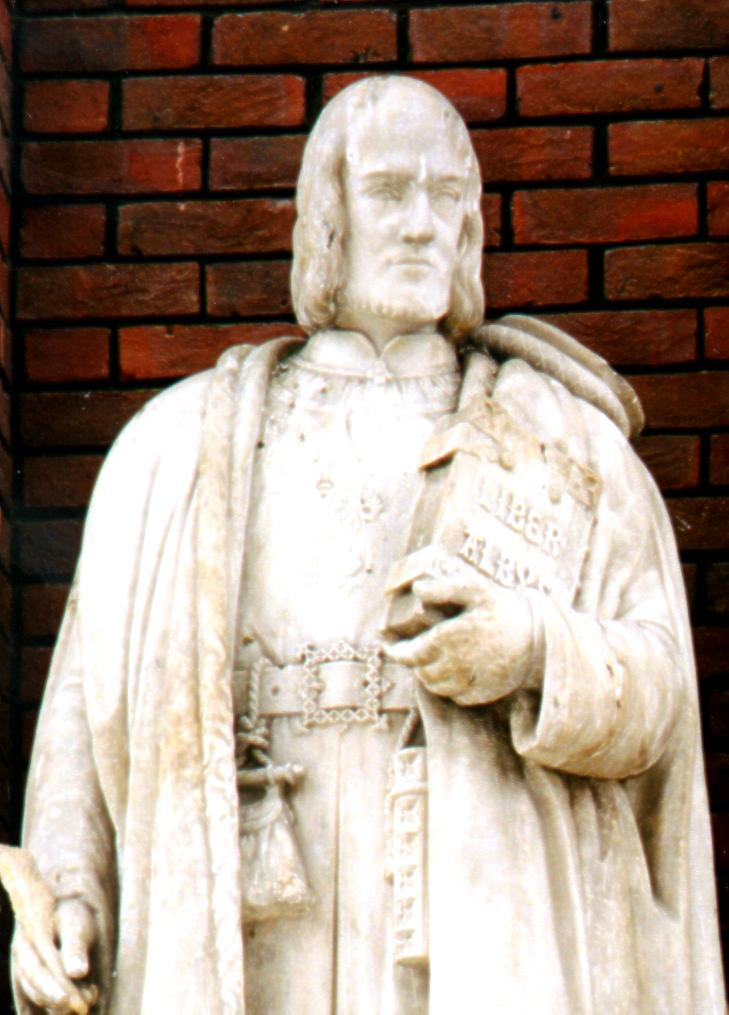
- Statue of John Carpenter by Samuel Nixon, The Great Hall, City of London School
- Born: c.1372; baptised 18 December 1378; Unknown location; baptised Hereford Cathedral
- Died: Between 8 March 1441 (will) and 12 May 1442 (will proved) – maybe April 1442; Buried in Westminster Abbey
- Other names: John Carpenter, town clerk of London
- Occupations: Town Clerk of London, author, founder
- Known for: Liber Albus, City of London School, Member of Parliament from London

John Carpenter, the younger (c.1372–1442), was a Town Clerk of London. He was elected as Town Clerk to the City of London during the reigns of Henry V and Henry VI. He was the author of the first book of English common law, called Liber Albus (the White Book). He was a member of the English Parliament from London in 1425. He is also recognized as the founder of the City of London School for boys. He resided in the Parish of St. Peter, Cornhill, London, and was buried in the Abbey of St. Peter, Westminster, where his wife Katherine was later interred.

He is frequently distinguished in historical documents as "John Carpenter, the younger", "John Carpenter, Junior" (incorrectly), and as "John Carpenter, Jenkin". "Jenkin" or "Jenken" is a diminutive of the name John.

John Carpenter was one of three men by that name who were prominent during the 15th century. Both others are mentioned in his will of 1442. One was his brother, John Carpenter the elder, who received much property from his younger brother.

John Carpenter may have been related in some way to the other John Carpenter who was the Warden of St. Anthony's Hospital, Rector of St. Mary Magdalen's, and Bishop of Worcester. Bishop John Carpenter was willed, by the subject of this article, "that book on architecture which Master William Cleve gave me". Cleve was King's Chaplain and clerk of the works, and carried out building at the Palace of Westminster and the Tower.

== Early life and ancestry ==
Thomas Brewer in his 1856 book on John Carpenter found no significant record of his life until his election as the Town Clerk or Common Clerk of the City of London on 20 April 1417, at about age 45. The exemption mentioned on page 14 suggests that John Carpenter had been in the City of London's service "from the time of his youth". It is assumed that he was apprenticed to John Marchaunt, his predecessor as Town Clerk. Based on Liber Albus (see below) and other works, he was familiar with the law.

Genealogical efforts have revealed a baptismal date of 18 December 1378 at Hereford Cathedral, but he was probably born earlier, with about 1372 being generally accepted. His father is listed as Richard Carpenter and his mother as Christina.

His father, Richard or Renaud Carpenter, is believed to have been born about 1335–1337 in or of Grand Pont, Cambrai, France. He may have been alive as late as 1412 in London. He married Christina, last name unknown, who was of London. Their known children were:

- John Carpenter, the elder, born circa 1362, the father of Bishop John Carpenter. His baptismal date of 20 September 1371 in Battlesden has not been confirmed and is probably wrong. His death date is unknown.
- Robert Carpenter, born circa 1368, of London. His brother's will indicates that he had a son named Richard and two daughters named Joan and Katherine.
- John Carpenter, the younger – the subject of this article.

His grandfather John or Jean Le Carpenter or Carpentier was born about 1303 of Le Grand Pont and died after 1345 in Dilwyn, Herefordshire. He married Jeanne Tabarie, who was born circa 1310 near Cambrai. His parents are disputed.

== Marriage ==
The date of John Carpenter's marriage has not been found, nor has the maiden name of his wife, Katherine.

Katherine was born in or of Zeeland (now a province of the Netherlands) about 1372. Her will was written 31 March 1457 and proved in June 1458. She was later buried with her husband in the Abbey of St. Peter, Westminster. They had no children.

== Political life ==
John Carpenter was elected the Town Clerk or Common Clerk of the City of London on 20 April 1417, two years after the Battle of Agincourt.

Proclamacio sup' judicio billor' appears to be the first public document signed by John Carpenter with his surname only.

He obtained a letter of patent from Henry VI dated 3 December 18 (either 1418, or the 18th year of Henry's reign, i.e. 1439), exempting him "for the whole of his life from all military and civil duties whatsoever, which included election as a member of Parliament and receiving the Honour of Knighthood". What service he rendered the Crown is unknown, but it can be assumed he provided a great service.

John Carpenter was a member of the English Parliament from London in 1425.

== Coat of arms ==
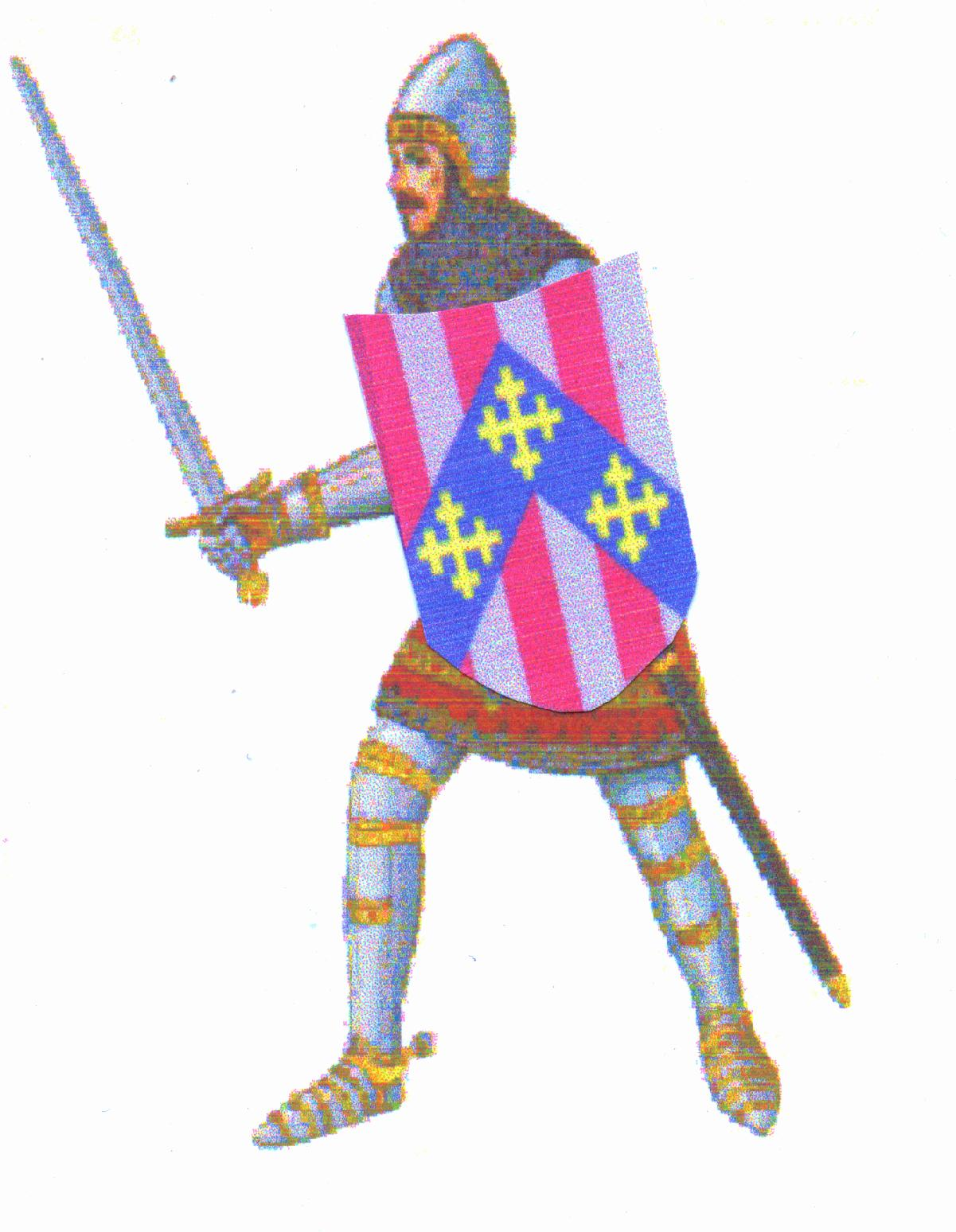
Illustration of a medieval knight bearing a Carpenter coat of arms.

John Carpenter's arms appear to be of French or Norman heritage, "Paly of six, argent and gules, on a chevron azure, 3 cross crosslets or." This coat is often referred to as the Hereford Arms, named for the later ancestral home of the Carpenter family in Hereford. The crest, supporters and motto apparently changed several times over the centuries. A more recent motto is Per acuta belli.

The Hereford Arms were granted in 1719 to George, Lord Carpenter (1657–1732). He was a Lt. General and commander-in-chief of all the Crown's forces in Scotland when he was elevated to the peerage of Ireland, by patent dated 29 May 1719, as Baron Carpenter, of Killaghy, county Kilkenny. There is no direct male to male Carpenter descent connecting Lord Carpenter and Sir William Boyd Carpenter. The family connection is by marriage through the females in the family.

William Boyd Carpenter (1841–1918), Bishop of Ripon in the Church of England, afterwards a Canon of Westminster and Chaplain to the reigning sovereign of England, wrote in a letter dated 7 August 1907 that his family bore the Hereford Arms. Sir Noel Paton, upon painting the family arms, informed him that the supporters were originally a round-handled sword, which in drawing over time became shortened, until nothing but the cross and globe were left beneath it. Those Hereford Arms were used by "John Carpenter, town clerk of London, who died 1442 A.D." His grandson John Boyd-Carpenter, Baron Boyd-Carpenter (1908–1998) continued the arms into the new century by passing them down to his son, Thomas Boyd-Carpenter, who was himself knighted after a military career as a Lieutenant-General and in public service.

The Hereford Coat of Arms described above should not be confused with the Arms of Bishop Richard Carpenter (c. 1450s? – 1503) presented in the "Visitations of the County of Oxford" taken in 1566, 1574, and 1634, published in 1871, which describe the arms displayed in the buildings at the University in Oxford – "In the Lyberarye of Baliall College" – as recorded by the officials performing the visitations in those years. The Visitations describe the arms of Richard Carpenter (theologian) as: "Paly of nine Gu. and Az. on a chevron Arg. surmounted by a mitre Or, three cross crosslets or – nine pales alternating red and blue, with a silver chevron bearing three gold cross-crosslets."

== Liber Albus ==
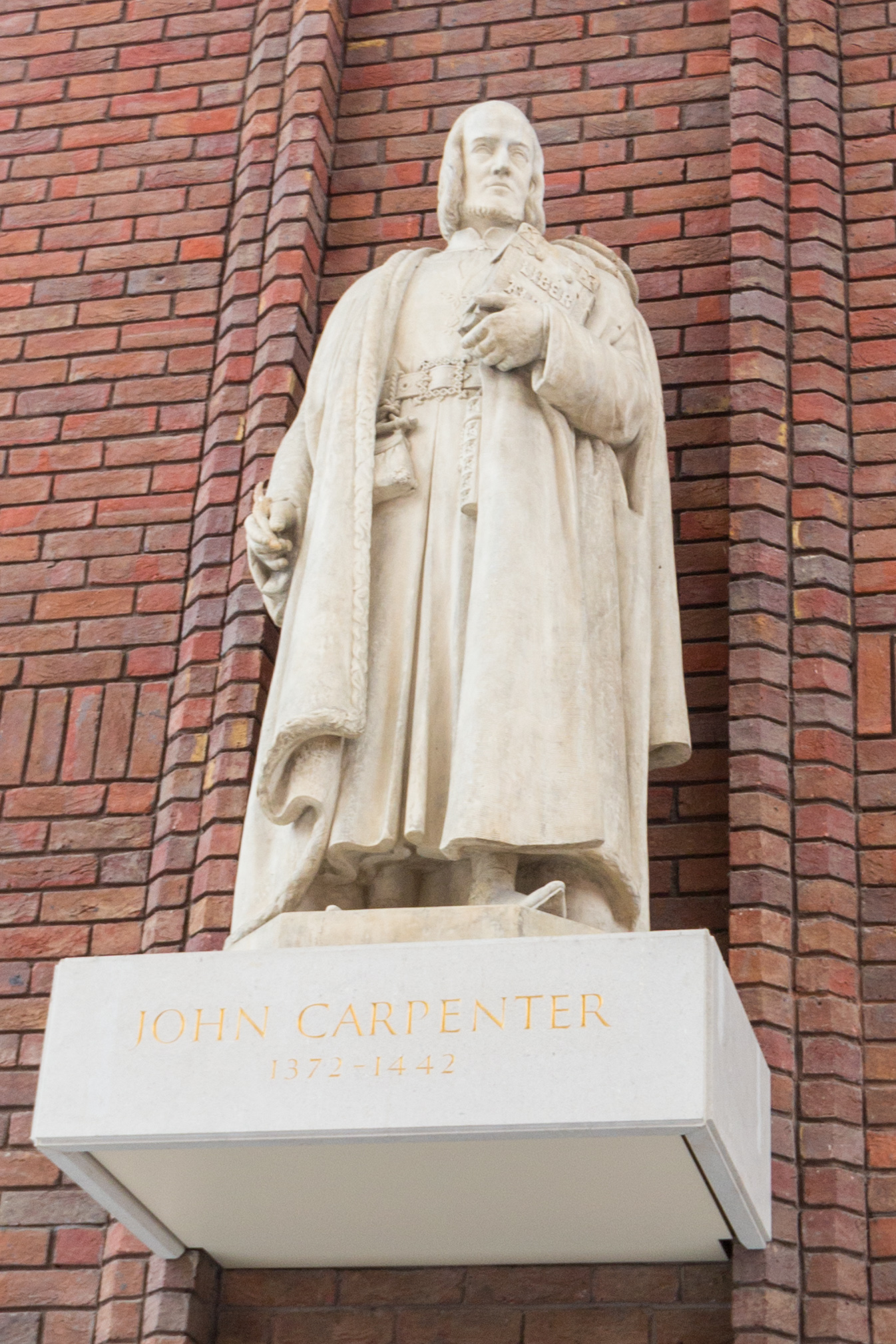
Statue of John Carpenter, founder of the City of London School, by Samuel Nixon (1804-1854).

John Carpenter was the author of first book of English Common Law, called Liber Albus ("White Book"), completed in 1419. It provided a basis of legal, social and history of the law relating to the City of London. The statue of John Carpenter, now residing within the City of London School for Boys, shows him holding this book.

The following lines were hand written (probably in the 16th century) on the fly-leaf of "Liber Albus" translated from Latin:

The book that once was white is white no more;
Made black with grease, and thumb'd its page o'er.
Then, while it still exists, transcribe each page;
Once gone, 'tis lost to every future age.
And if so lost—some fault of ours, 'tis true—
Ah me! thou gem of greatest price, Adieu!

== Latter life ==
At one point, John Carpenter reportedly owned over 300 tenements. He had a fish pond, doubling as a reservoir, on top of his own house. Most of these properties he later willed to his brother. He resided in the Parish of St. Peter, Cornhill, London.

John Carpenter's will was made in his 70th year, dated 8 March 1441 and proved 12 May 1442. This indicates he was born about 1372 and that his death may have been some time in April 1442. He was buried at St Peter upon Cornhill, London.

Bequest for the betterment of poor children: John Stow recorded the actual bequest as, "He gave tenements to the Citye for the finding and bringing up of foure poore men's children with meate, drinke, apparell, learning at the schooles in the universities, &c., until they be preferred, and then others in their place for ever."

John Carpenter left property to the City of London (later known as the Corporation of London) to provide "Carpenter's Children" (as they became known) to assist at divine service in the choir of the Guildhall chapel on festival days. That continued for almost 400 years until an Act of Parliament (1834) permitted the combining of several accounts to establish the City of London School. Since 1986, the school has resided on the east end of John Carpenter Street and Queen Victoria Street.

== See also ==
- Common Law
- Ralph Crepyn, town clerk of London
- Medieval English common law: foundations for 21st century legal systems
- John Monckton (town clerk)
- John Sadler (1615-1674), town clerk of London
- Town Clerk of London

Preceded by John Marchaunt	Town Clerk of London; 1419–1438?	Succeeded by Richard Barnett
Parliament of England
Preceded by	Member of Parliament for London; 1425, 1437, 1439	Succeeded by
