= John Aspinall =

John Aspinall may refer to:

- John Aspinall (zoo owner) (1926–2000), English zoo owner and gambler
- John Aspinall (engineer) (1851–1937), English engineer
- John Aspinall (politician) (c. 1815–1865), English Conservative Party politician, Member of Parliament for Clitheroe 1853
- John Aspinall (footballer) (born 1959), English footballer
- John Aspinall (cricketer) (1877–1932), Irish cricketer
