= City of London Finance Committee =

The City of London Finance Committee is a committee of the City of London Corporation. In its current form it has existed since 1992. It is responsible for prudent management of the City Corporation's funds and controls a range of important functions of the City Corporation.

== History ==
The Finance Committee was originally called the Coal, Corn and Rates Finance Committee when the Coal, Corn and Finance Committee was merged with the Rates Committee on 21 March 1968.

=== Coal, Corn and Finance Committee ===
The Coal, Corn and Finance Committee grew out the need to manage the coal duties imposed in 1667 for rebuilding the city after the Fire of London.

After being transferred to the Metropolitan Board of Works they were finally abolished in 1889 when the London County Council was created. The Committee used to administer the City's Cash.
