= John Barradell =

British civil servant

John Barradell OBE
- Born: 20 August 1960 (age 65); London
- Occupation: Public servant
- Known for: Town Clerk and Chief Executive, City of London Corporation

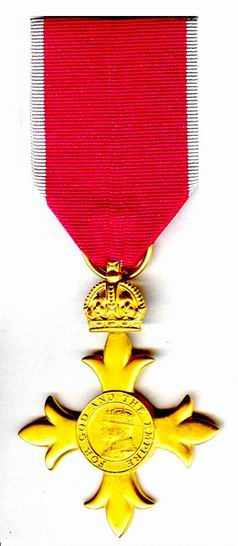

John Bernard Barradell OBE (born 20 August 1960), served as Town Clerk and Chief Executive of the Corporation of London (2012–23).

== Career ==
Educated at Bishop Challoner School, he went up to UCL where he read geography (graduating BA).

Barradell pursued a career in the information and communication technology sector, playing a variety of marketing management roles for such companies as Unisys and Hewlett Packard.

Serving with the Special Police Force, he was promoted Chief Officer and was appointed Officer of the Order of the British Empire (OBE) in the 2008 New Year Honours for "services to the police".

In 2002, Barradell joined Westminster City Council, being promoted Deputy Chief Executive, then Chief Executive 2006–09. Chief Executive of Brighton and Hove Council 2009-12, he became in 2012 Town Clerk of London, succeeding Chris Duffield.

He chairs the National Emergencies Trust and since 2016, he chairs the Sir Simon Milton Foundation, a charitable organisation set up to promote the vision of society developed by the Conservative politician Sir Simon Milton, Leader of Westminster City Council from 2000 to 2008.

=== Town Clerk successor ===
Ian Thomas CBE succeeded as 51st Town Clerk of London in February 2023, after the ten-year tenure of John Barradell ended on 31 December 2022.

Civic offices
Preceded by Chris Duffield	Town Clerk of London; 2012–2022	Succeeded by Ian Thomas
