= Chris Duffield =

- Born: 20 May 1952 (age 73); St Albans, England
- Occupation: public servant
- Known for: Town Clerk of London & Chief Executive of the Corporation of the City of London

Christopher Paul Duffield (born 20 May 1952) is the former Town Clerk of London and Chief Executive of the Corporation of the City of London. He was succeeded by John Barradell in 2012.

== Early life ==
Duffield was born on 20 May 1952, the son of Jack and Irene Duffield. He was educated at St Albans School, a then all-boys private school in Hertfordshire. He graduated from Newcastle University in 1973 with a Bachelor of Arts (BA Hons).

== Career ==
He has served in local government for nearly 30 years and prior to joining the City of London was the Chief Executive of Bexley Council. He has also previously worked for the GLC, Redbridge and Essex.

=== Corporation of London ===
He joined the corporation by appointment to the Town Clerk and Chief Executive position in September 2003 and has previously worked as the Chief Executive of a London Borough and as the assistant director of finance at the Greater London Council

He is also the chief executive of the Police Authority. His responsibility is to oversee all Police Authority staff. He works closely with the chairman to facilitate efficient and effective police service within the City of London.

Sample duties of the Town Clerk and Chief Executive include, but are not limited to:

- Efficient management and execution of City functions.
- Primary advisor on policy and resources.
- Servicing meetings of the Court of Common Council and designated committees.
- Servicing meetings of the Court of Alderman and designated committees.
- Investigating complaints against the city.
- Electoral Registration Officer.
- Overseer of public relations.
- Overseer of economic development.
- Overseer of human resources.

== Associations ==
Duffield is a member of the Chartered Institute of Public Finance and Accountancy (CIPFA).

== Family ==
He is married and has three sons, Mark, Jack and Joe Duffield. He also has four grandchildren, Amelia, Alex, Katie and Stanley Duffield.

He has a brother, Ian Duffield who has 2 children Paul Duffield and Melanie Duffield

Civic offices
Preceded by Tom Christopher Simmons	Town Clerk of London; 2003–2012	Succeeded by John Barradell
