= John Sadler (town clerk) =

English lawyer, academic and Member of Parliament

John Sadler, of Warmwell
- Born: 18 August 1615; England
- Died: April 1674 (aged 58); England
- Other names: John Sadler, town clerk of London
- Occupations: Lawyer, public official
- Known for: English lawyer, Member of Parliament, Town Clerk of London, Hebraist, Neoplatonist, academic

John Sadler (of Warmwell, Dorset) (18 August 1615 – April 1674) was an English lawyer, academic, Member of Parliament, Town Clerk of London, Hebraist, Neoplatonist and millenarian thinker, private secretary to Oliver Cromwell, and member of the Parliamentarian Council of State. He was Master of Magdalene College, Cambridge from 1650 to 1660.

Sadler was educated at Emmanuel College at the University of Cambridge.

== Career ==
=== Politics ===
He was nominated for Cambridgeshire for the 1653 Barebone's Parliament. In 1659, for the Third Protectorate Parliament, he was MP for Yarmouth, in the Isle of Wight.

Ernestine van der Wall writes:

John Sadler (1615–1674) was a well-known London lawyer and constitutional theorist, and a good friend of Oliver Cromwell, at one time serving as his personal secretary. During the 1650s he held several offices, being secretary to the Council of State and a member of the Committee for the Advancement of Learning and the Committee for Lunatics.

The Hale Commission on law reform, headed from 1652 by Sir Matthew Hale, had Sadler as a leading lawyer, together with William Steele and John Fountain.

He was Town Clerk of London from 3 July 1649 (elected) to 18 September 1660. He was removed on the Restoration, under the pretext that he had signed the death warrant of Christopher Love. He was suspended 4 September 1660, then the suspension was removed on 6 September 1660 and finally he was "declared incapable of office" on 18 September 1660.

=== Political thought ===
He wrote The Rights of the Kingdom (1649), a founding document of British Israelism. Tudor Parfitt calls it "one of the first invented expressions of an invented Israelite genealogy for the British". This was not, however, its overt purpose. Glen Burgess calls it "an historical defence of the regicide". Maurice Vile writes

Sadler's view of the executive function was, as we have seen, not our modern one, but in other respects his grasp of the principles of the doctrine of the separation of powers was clear.

=== Hartlib circle ===
Sadler was a philosemite, on friendly terms with Menasseh Ben Israel. He believed that readmission would allow for the Jews to be converted to Christianity, which would hasten the new millennium (which he conceived as being a time of "more justice and more mercy" rather than being visited by Christ's "bodily presence"). He was also an associate of Samuel Hartlib and John Dury. This interest was not clearly separated from the line taken by Sadler in The Rights of the Kingdom.

== Personal life ==
He married Jane, daughter of the Dorset MP John Trenchard.

== See also ==
- Ralph Crepyn, town clerk of London
- John Carpenter, town clerk of London
- John Monckton (town clerk)

Preceded by Robert Mitchell	Town Clerk of London; 1649–1660	Succeeded by Sir John Weld
Parliament of the United Kingdom
Preceded by	Member of Parliament for Cambridge; 1653	Succeeded by
Academic offices
Preceded by Edward Rainbow	Master of Magdalene College, Cambridge; 1650–1660	Succeeded by Edward Rainbow
