= George Gillon =

Councilman of the City of London

George Marr Flemington Gillon MBE (born November 1942) was a councilman of the City of London Corporation where he represented the ward of Cordwainer. He was master of the Worshipful Company of Chartered Surveyors in 2002/2003. He was Sheriff of London from 2008 to 2009 and Chief Commoner of the Court of Common Council for 2013/2014.

Gillon was appointed Member of the Order of the British Empire (MBE) in the 2017 New Year Honours for services to the City of London Corporation and the Scottish community in London.
