= John Braddick Monckton =

British lawyer and civil servant (1832–1902)

Sir John Braddick Monckton
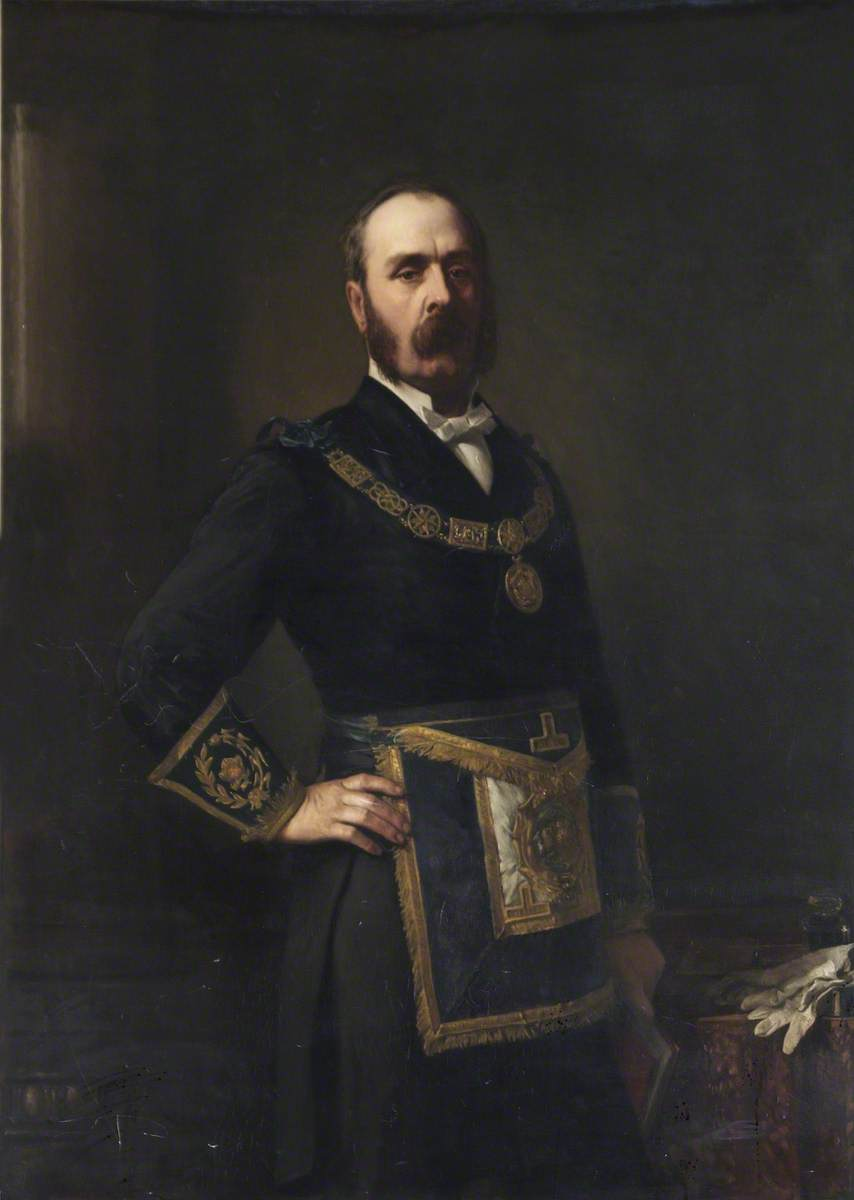
- Monckton, in Masonic regalia
- Born: 8 July 1832; Maidstone, Kent, England
- Died: 3 February 1902 (aged 69); Cranley Gardens, Middlesex, England
- Resting place: Brompton Cemetery
- Years active: 1851–1902
- Known for: lawyer, civil servant, Town Clerk of London
- Parent(s): John Monckton, Eliza Whitmore Braddick
- Relatives: Lionel Monckton (son)

Sir John Braddick Monckton FSA (8 July 1832 – 3 February 1902) was a British lawyer and civil servant, then Town Clerk of London for 30 years until his death. He was elected Town Clerk of London after the death of Frederick Woodthorpe on 17 July 1873 and served until 3 February 1902, his death date. The "Remembrancer" officiated during vacancy until the next Town Clerk was elected on 1 May 1902.

He was educated at Rugby School and while living on King Street in 1851 he became a Solicitor's Articled clerk for the City of London.

He represented the 'Guild of Saddlers of the City of London' in 1875.

He was a Master of 'Worshipful Company of Coachmakers and Coach Harness Makers of London' in 1893 & 1894.

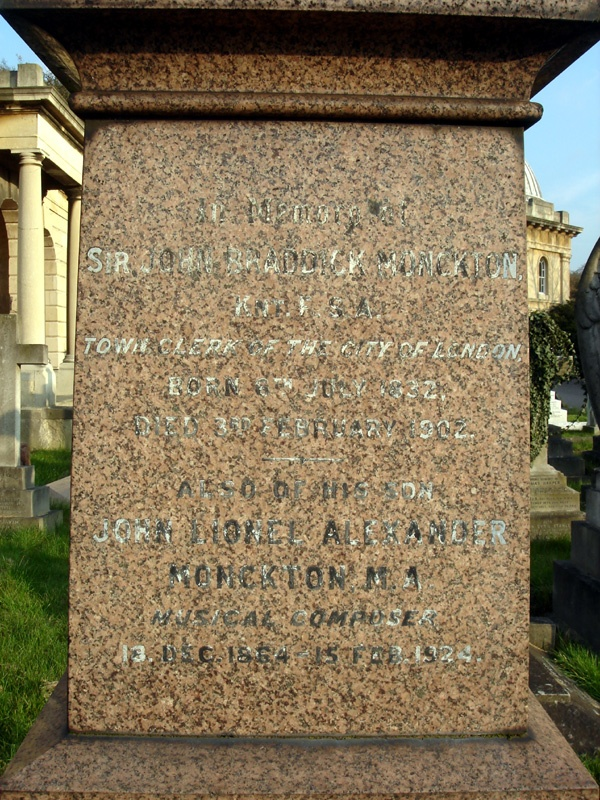
Funerary monument (detail), Brompton Cemetery, London

== Family ==
His parents were John Monckton (born about 1803 in East Peckham (Kent) - died September 1886 in Maidstone, Kent, England and Eliza Whitmore (maiden name unknown). He was one of ten children growing up on King Street, Maidstone, Kent, England.

In 1858 he married an amateur actress Maria Louisa Long (1837–1920).

Their eldest son was composer Lionel Monckton. Their daughter, Mrs. Augusta Moore, who wrote as 'Martin J. Pritchard,' was a popular novelist of the period.

He is buried in Brompton Cemetery, London in the south-east part of the central enclosed roundel.

== See also ==
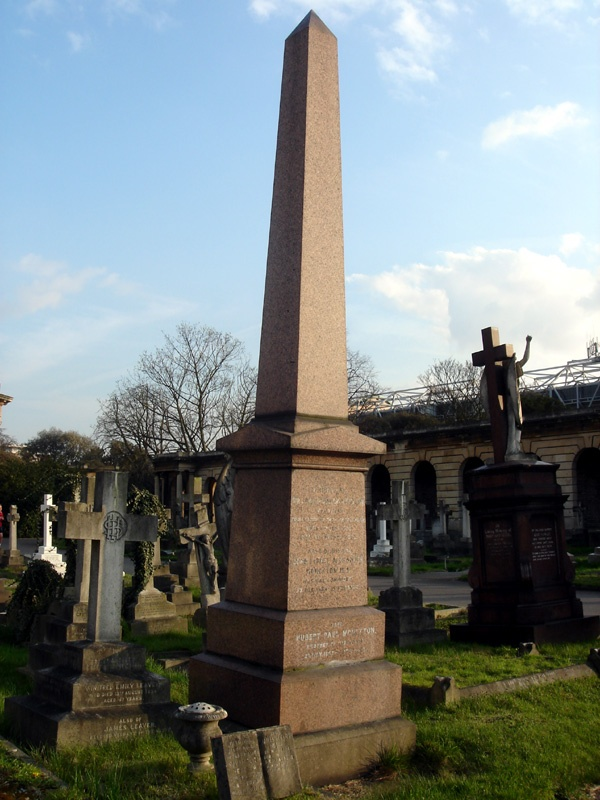
Funerary monument, Brompton Cemetery, London

- Ralph Crepyn, town clerk of London
- John Carpenter, town clerk of London
- John Sadler (1615-1674), town clerk of London

Preceded by Frederick Woodthorpe	Town Clerk of London; 1873 – 1902	Succeeded by James Bell
