= Ralph Crepyn =

Member of the Parliament of England

Ralph Crepyn, aka Ralph de Alegate
- Born: c. 1245 unknown, England
- Died: before 1331; London, Middlesex, England.
- Other names: Ralph Crepyn, town clerk of London - Radulphus de Alegate
- Occupations: Town Clerk of London, lawyer, Member of Parliament
- Known for: Town clerk of London, early London Lawyer, Member of Parliament

Ralph Crepyn (also known as Radulphus de Alegate) was a lawyer and the first documented Town Clerk of London in 1274. His birth was about 1245, and he was well-educated for his day. He died before 1331, but the exact date is unknown.

== Town clerk service ==
Crepyn served as Town Clerk of London from 1274 to November 1284, and again from 1286 to at least 1306. His two-year absence from 1284 to 1286 was due to a royal inquest, after which he was restored to office. During this time period, the term "clericus" or "common clerk" was used for the Town Clerk of London.

== Attack and aftermath ==
In November 1284, he suffered a serious injury when attacked in the street by Laurence Duket. This event excited local society because Ralph Crepyn was defending the honor of his mistress Alice Atte-Bowe. His attacker then fled to St Mary-le-Bow to seek sanctuary. Within days, Laurence Duket was found hanging from the mullion of one of the church's windows in what was believed to be a suicide. In an official inquest, the Sheriff and others declared the incident closed. However, a young boy who was closeted within the church claims to have seen what really happened.

John de Bauquell was listed as the clerk of the city on 21 November 1284 through most of 1285.

=== Royal inquest ===
On 2 July 1285, Crepyn's estates in Cornhill were given to Ralph de Sandwych to hold for King Edward I of England. This was due to a Royal inquest that seized all of Crepyn's lands in Borham, and also in Ware, in the county of Hertford, along with lands and estates in Stepney and Hackney. Richard de Gravesend, Bishop of London, took care of the recovering Crepyn during the Royal inquest into the vile murder of Laurence Ducket, who had been given Church sanctuary. It is unknown if Ralph served within the gaol during this period.

After the Royal inquest and the sentence given, Alice Atte-Bowe was burnt at the stake, which was the common execution for women. Fifteen "ruffians", who she enticed to commit the murder within the Bow Church were hanged. Sheriff Jordan Godchepe (a friend of Crepyn) and several others were imprisoned during the months of the inquest. Finally they, along with Crepyn, were released after paying stiff fines.

== Summary ==
Coat of arms of the City of London.

Ralph Crepyn was noted as a "clerk in the service of the mayor of London" in 1286 and his lands were restored by the King due to his incapacity during the murder of his assailant. In 1294 Richard Crepyn (Richard de Gloucester) and in 1306 Walter Crepyn (Walter de Gloucestre) were documented as sons of Ralph Crepyn, the clerk. By 1331 Ralph Crepyn is reported as deceased.

== Portrayal in fiction ==
- Satan in St Mary's - Paul Doherty, 1986, www.revealweb.org.uk - ISBN 0-7472-3492-2 - McArthur & Company - 1990 Paperback ISBN 0-7472-3492-2 and ISBN 978-0-7472-3492-0
- This is a work of fiction based on events in the life of the first Town Clerk of London. The blurb describing this book reads,

"Building on an actual murder in 1284, Doherty (The Death of a King) auspiciously begins a mystery series featuring Hugh Corbett, clerk of the King's Bench. Lawrence Duket, goldsmith, kills Ralph Crepyn, moneylender, and flees to London's St. Mary Le Bow for sanctuary. The next day Duket is found hanged inside the locked church, an apparent suicide. Bishop Burnell, Chancellor for King Edward I, assigns Corbett to investigate. Burnell fears that the antiroyal Populares party will join with practitioners of devil worship at this time, Christianity is only skin deep. Hugh Corbett is threatened and attacked while probing a suicide which was really murder which . . . masked treason, sorcery and rebellion. The satanist group seems to be centered at The Mitre, a tavern owned by the beautiful Alice atte Bowe, with whom Corbett falls in love. The mystery is neatly done and Doherty's ease of scholarship in giving us the rich sights, sounds and smells of medieval London is masterful." http://www.fantasticfiction.co.uk/d/p-c-doherty/satan-in-st-marys.htm

== See also ==
- Town Clerk of London
- John Carpenter, town clerk of London
- John Sadler (1615-1674), town clerk of London
- John Monckton (town clerk) of London

== References and notes ==
- Additional information can be seen in "Hundred Rolls", pp. 428 & 415. And see: MISC MSS3 66.1.

=== Bibliography ===
- Hopkinson, Henry Lennox (1913). A History of the Site of Merchant Taylors' Hall And Adjoining Properties Belonging to the Guild of Merchant Taylors of the Fraternity of Saint John Baptist, in the City of London. London: Riorden Press.

Preceded by	Town Clerk of London; 1274–1306	Succeeded by William ____
Parliament of the United Kingdom
Preceded by	Member of Parliament for London; Several years from 1285 to 1307	Succeeded by
