= Ian Thomas (town clerk) =

British local government official (born 1969)

Ian Thomas CBE
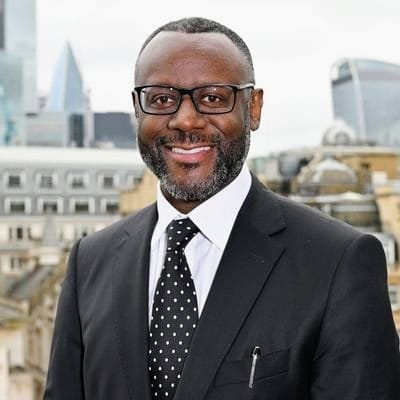
- Ian Thomas, Town Clerk of London (2023)
- Born: 15 September 1969 (age 57); Sheffield, Yorkshire, UK
- Education: University of Lancaster (MA)
- Occupations: Town Clerk & Chief Executive of the City of London Corporation
- Awards: CBE

Ian Cornelius Thomas CBE (born 15 September 1969), is a British local government official. Having worked in local government for over 20 years, in 2023 Thomas was appointed as the 51st Town Clerk of London and Chief Executive of the City of London Corporation.

== Early life ==
Born in Sheffield, South Yorkshire to Jamaican parents who emigrated to the United Kingdom as part of the Windrush Generation.

Thomas originally trained to be a footballer and was signed to Sheffield United until suffering a back injury; he is related to Dame Jessica Ennis-Hill.

Thomas attended Newfield Secondary School, Sheffield, before studying Professional Practice (Change Management) at Lancaster University, graduating MA in 2007.

== Career ==
Thomas started his career in public service at Trafford Council in 1999, before joining Derbyshire County Council (2006–14), becoming Director of Children’s Services from 2011 to 2014: during this time, the number of children in Derbyshire who achieved five or more GCSEs trebled in a single year. Ofsted praised Thomas's leadership for creating "a culture of learning, support and challenge".

=== Rotherham Borough Council ===
Thomas was initially headhunted on a one-year contract by Malcolm Newsam, the Children's Social Care Commissioner appointed by the UK Government to oversee children's and young people's services in Rotherham in the wake of the Jay Report by Professor Alexis Jay.

As Rotherham Metropolitan Borough Council's Strategic Director for Children and Young People from 2015 until 2018, Thomas transformed the council's social services, for which he received national recognition.

=== Lewisham Council and Kingston-upon-Thames Council ===
Thomas was chief executive of the London Borough of Lewisham in 2018, before being appointed CEO of the Royal Borough of Kingston-upon-Thames (2019–23) where he led a £1.2bn regeneration programme providing an additional 1,338 new homes in Kingston, plus investment in schools, leisure and cultural facilities, new jobs and apprenticeships, and inward investment, including Unilever's new global HQ.

In 2020, Thomas, writing in the Local Government Chronicle, said the sector needed to make better use of AI, robotic process automation, and augmented reality.

=== Corporation of the City of London ===
Town Clerk and CEO of the City Corporation since February 2023, Thomas also oversees the City of London Police Authority.

As Town Clerk of London, a position dating back to the 13th century, Thomas acts as head of the City of London's paid service, leading over 4,000 City Corporation staff, and is principal advisor to the City's elected Commoners on matters of policy.

== Honours and awards ==
For "services to Local Government and Children's Services" in the wake of the Rotherham child sexual exploitation scandal, Thomas was appointed a CBE in the 2019 New Year Honours.

In 2025, Thomas was named as one of Britain’s most influential black people in the Powerlist. The following year, during the list's 21st anniversary edition, he topped the ranking as the UK's most influential Black Briton, joining previous number one honourees such as Sir Lewis Hamilton and Edward Enninful.

== Personal life ==
Thomas married Sadie Elizabeth Clarke in 2009, and lives in London with their two sons and two daughters.

Civic offices
Preceded by John Barradell	Town Clerk of London; 2023–present	Succeeded by in office
