= Parliamentary agent =

Parliamentary agents are solicitors who are licensed (together with the firms they belong to) by the Houses of Parliament in the United Kingdom to draft, promote or oppose private bills. Private bills are a specific class of legislation promoted by organisations outside Parliament to obtain powers for themselves that differ from the general law.

== History ==
In 1836, due to the obvious conflict of interest, the Clerks of the House were debarred from carrying out what had been a lucrative line of agency work. Parliamentary agents expanded into the space vacated by the clerks and formed the Society of Parliamentary Agents in 1840.

The high point for parliamentary agency work was during the mid-19th century, during the rise of the railway industry, because railway companies often needed parliamentary powers to build and run their operations. That was a source of political controversy, in that railway directors were increasingly seen as becoming overly powerful, leading the prime minister at the time, William Ewart Gladstone, to identify parliamentary agents as "the deeper power in opposition".

== Today ==
As private bills make up a very small proportion of contemporary legislation, with most legislation being sponsored by the government and thus drafted and supported by the Civil Service, the work of parliamentary agents has relatively diminished and there are now only seven firms of parliamentary agents: BDB Pitmans LLP, employing five Roll A agents, Winckworth Sherwood LLP and Eversheds Sutherland (International) LLP (formerly Rees & Freres), each employing three Roll A agents, Sharpe Pritchard LLP, employing two Roll A agents and Bryan Cave Leighton Paisner LLP, Pinsent Masons LLP and Veale Wasbrough Vizards LLP who each have one Roll A agent.

It is also possible for any person to become a Roll B parliamentary agent for the purpose of opposing a single bill in Parliament. Such a person must either be a solicitor or have "a certificate of respectability".

Much of the work of parliamentary agents, as experts in the legislative process and Whitehall and Westminster political culture, would now come under the profession of political consultancy, although the remaining parliamentary agents are now billed as law firms first and parliamentary agents second. However, the largest of the seven firms, Bircham Dyson Bell, has developed a political consultancy business within its legal practice, thus giving it the rare distinction of most of its political consultants also being qualified lawyers.

Parliamentary agents can observe House of Commons proceedings from the under gallery near the entrance to the chamber.

The City Remembrancer is a Roll A parliamentary agent.
