= Michael Dormer (lord mayor) =

English knight and Lord Mayor of London (d. 1545)

Sir Michael Dormer
- Died: 20 September 1545
- Spouse(s): Elizabeth (surname unknown); Katherine Dallam
- Children: Thomas Dormer; William Dormer; Geoffrey Dormer; John Dormer; Ambrose Dormer; Walter Dormer; Joan Dormer
- Parent(s): Geoffrey Dormer, Alice Collingridge

Sir Michael Dormer (died 20 September 1545) was a wealthy member of the Mercers' Company, and Lord Mayor of London in 1541.

== Family ==
Michael Dormer was the son of Geoffrey Dormer (d. 9 March 1503), Merchant of the Staple of Calais, by his second marriage to Alice Collingridge. By his first marriage to a wife named Margery, whose surname is unknown, Geoffrey Dormer had five sons, including his eldest son and heir, William Dormer (d.1506), and eight daughters. By his second marriage, Geoffrey Dormer had seven sons, including Michael Dormer, and five daughters. By 1498, however, only six of Geoffrey Dormer's twelve sons were still living, William and Thomas, by his first marriage, and Geoffrey, Michael, Peter and Edward by his second marriage.

== Career ==
Dormer was a demy at Magdalen College, Oxford, and "brought up in learning there". He acquired considerable wealth as a London Mercer, and as a member of the wool staple at Calais, and was actively involved in both the affairs of the Worshipful Company of Mercers and civic government. He was Sheriff of London in 1529–30, Master of the Mercers in 1531 and 1545, an Alderman from 1531 until his death in 1545, and Lord Mayor of London in 1541. Dormer purchased several manors, including Long Crendon, which he bought from Thomas Grey, 2nd Marquess of Dorset in 1520, and the manor of Hughenden, which he purchased from the Crown for £387 in 1539 after the last Prior of Kenilworth had surrendered it during the dissolution of the monasteries.

In 1539 Dormer married Katherine (née Dallam), and he and his wife resided for a time at The Key, a property which her former husband, Richard Collier (d.1533), had purchased in 1520. It was said to have been "an extensive holding on the south side of Cheapside, almost opposite Mercers' Hall, in the parish of St Pancras, Soper Lane". Collier had directed in his will that if his two children died without issue, his property called The Sun was to be sold to establish a free school in Horsham, Sussex, where he had been born, and The Key was to be granted to the Mercers' Company to enable them to pay a schoolmaster and maintain the school. Collier's children had both died by 1540 and the Mercers "had to persuade the widow and sole surviving executor, Katherine, now married to Sir Michael Dormer, to establish the school". In August 1540 Dormer paid £8 6s 8d for "a house and garden near Horsham church", which remained the home of The College of Richard Collyer until 1893. Almost 300 years after Dormer's purchase, as a result of a lawsuit in 1810, it was found that, as the school property had been conveyed to Dormer by a deed dated 10 August 1540, the school was therefore now the property of Dormer's heir at law, but that "it was impracticable at such a distance of time to ascertain who was such heir at law".

Dormer was knighted after 1538, probably during his term as Lord Mayor of London in 1541. He made his will on 17 September 1545, leaving a house in London and extensive lands in Buckinghamshire and Oxfordshire to his widow, six sons, and daughter. He appointed as executors his wife, Katherine, and son, John, and as overseers his son-in-law, Anthony Stapleton (c.1514–1574), and his nephew of the half blood, Sir Robert Dormer (d.1552), son of William Dormer (d.1506), and father of Sir William Dormer (d.1575).

== Marriages and issue ==
Dormer married firstly, before 1505, a wife named Elizabeth Davye, by whom he had six sons, Thomas, William, Geoffrey, John, Ambrose and Walter (a cleric), and a daughter, Joan, who married firstly James Bolney (d.1536), by whom she had a daughter, Agnes; secondly Edward Borlase (d.1544); and thirdly, Anthony Stapleton, by whom she had two sons, Michael and Amyas, who died without issue.

Dormer married secondly, on 21 August 1539, Katherine Dallam, the daughter of Thomas Dallam, Warden of the Skinners' Company in 1497. Katherine Dallam's first husband was a London Mercer, Richard Collier (d.1533), the founder of Collyer's School in Horsham, Sussex, by whom she had a son and daughter, George and Dorothy. Between 1533 and November 1535 Katherine married, as his second wife, Robert Pakington (d.1536), a London Mercer who was murdered on the morning of Monday 13 November 1536 while crossing Cheapside on his way to early Mass at the Mercers' chapel of St Thomas of Acre. Katherine's two children by her marriage to Richard Collier died about the time of her third marriage to Dormer. She appears to have had no issue by her second and third marriages.

Dormer died in 1545 and was buried at St Lawrence Jewry Church. Katherine survived him by many years and was buried on 29 January 1563.
