= Anthony Stapleton =

16th-century English politician and lawyer

- Born: c. 1514
- Died: 1574
- Spouses: Joan Dormer; Alice Roos
- Children: Michael Stapleton; Amyas Stapleton
- Parent(s): George Stapleton, Margaret Gasgill

Anthony Stapleton (c. 1514–1574) was a Tudor lawyer, member of parliament, and Clerk of the City of London.

== Family ==
Anthony Stapleton, born by 1514, came of a family long settled in Yorkshire. He was the third son of George Stapleton of Rempstone, Nottinghamshire, and Margaret Gasgill, the daughter and co-heir of William Gasgill of Rolleston, Nottinghamshire. His father, George Stapleton, was the second son of Sir Bryan Stapleton by Joan or Jane Lovell, the daughter of John Lovell, 8th Baron Lovell (d.1464), and sister of Francis Lovell, 1st Viscount Lovell.

== Career ==
In her 1537 will Elizabeth (née Scrope), Dowager Countess of Oxford, bequeathed Anthony Stapleton ten pounds 'towards his learning at the common law'. He was educated at the Inner Temple, and was active in its affairs throughout his life. He 'rarely missed a parliament' of the Inner Temple, was Reader in 1543, 1544, and 1553, 'and held the highest offices', serving as treasurer during the years 1555–7, and as governor in 1555 and 1566. Among his legal clients were Henry Percy, 5th Earl of Northumberland; his paternal uncle, Sir Brian Stapleton; John de Vere, 16th Earl of Oxford, whose will he witnessed in 1548; and the Dean and Chapter of Westminster, who paid him a retainer of 40s a year.

In 1544 he was appointed Recorder for Colchester in Essex, perhaps through Lord Oxford's influence, and in the same year was granted the reversion of the office of Town Clerk of London, although he was not able to take up the position until 24 July 1570. By the early 1550s he was a member of Oxford's council. In 1554 he was elected to Parliament for East Grinstead.

Stapleton made his will on 20 October 1569, appointing his second wife as executrix. He was granted a leave from his position as Clerk of the City of London in early 1574 on grounds of illness, and appears to have died shortly thereafter, as his successor in the clerkship took up the position on 25 May 1574. His will was proved on 12 October 1575.

== Marriages and issue ==
Anthony Stapleton married firstly, by licence dated 14 August 1544, Joan Dormer, the daughter of Sir Michael Dormer, Lord Mayor of London, by whom he had two sons, Michael and Amyas, who died without issue. This was Joan Dormer's third marriage; she had earlier been the wife of James Bolney (d.1536), by whom she had a daughter, Agnes, and of Edward Borlase (d.1544), by whom she had several children, including John Borlase.

He married secondly Alice Roos, the daughter of Francis Roos of Laxton, Nottinghamshire, by whom he had no issue. After Stapleton's death, Alice married Thomas Leke of Derbyshire.
