= Tom Hoffman =

Thomas Dieter Dirk Hoffman MBE LLB FCA (born August 1945) was a councilman of the City of London Corporation, where he represented the ward of Vintry.

== Early life and career ==
Hoffman was educated at St. John's College School and The Leys School, Cambridge. He studied law at the University of Exeter. He is a Fellow of the Institute of Chartered Accountants in England & Wales and had a career in banking until his retirement in 2003.

== Offices ==
He was elected to the Court of Common Council in 2002. He is a governor of the Museum of London, the Barbican Centre, and the City of London School for Girls (and former chairman). He was a governor of King's College Hospital and, since 2012, has been a governor of Guy's & St. Thomas Hospital. He was a member of the Council of the University of Exeter, governor of Birkbeck College, of which he is an Honorary Fellow, chairman of the Guildhall School of Music & Drama, chairman of the board of the London Festival Orchestra, and almoner and governor of Christ's Hospital.

== Guilds ==
Hoffman is a member of the Court of the Tylers' and Bricklayers' Company, of which he was master in 2006/7. He is honorary treasurer of the Guildhall Historical Association, which published his paper on The Rise & Decline of Guilds in Great Britain and Ireland. He compiled a four-volume Bibliography on the Guilds of Great Britain and Ireland, which is published on the website of Birkbeck College.
