= Anthony Eskenzi =

British politician

Anthony Noel Eskenzi, CBE, (born January 1933) was a councilman of the City of London Corporation where he represented the ward of Farringdon Within. A chartered surveyor, Eskenzi was appointed Queen's Sheriff for the City of London and previously elected Chief Commoner. He was a councilman since 1970 and at the time of his retirement was the senior elected member of the City of London Corporation. He was chairman of the Police Authority. He was appointed CBE for services to the City of London and youth enterprise and awarded a DSc by City University for his services to the City of London.
