= Henry Woodthorpe Jr. =

Henry William Holder Woodthorpe Jr. (1780 – 3 March 1842) succeeded his father, Henry Woodthorpe Sr., as Town Clerk of London on 6 October 1825.

Henry Jr. had started to work in the Town Clerk's department of the City of London Corporation at an early age. When his father became deaf and otherwise infirm, Henry Jr. was appointed Deputy Town Clerk in 1818. He was elected to take over his father's post following the latter's death on 4 September 1825. His son, Frederick Woodthorpe, was also eventually to succeed to the post on 10 February 1859.

In 1837 he had to file for insolvency.

He had four sons, but only two survived him: Frederick Woodthorpe and Edmund Woodthorpe (1814-87), an architect.

Civic offices
Preceded by Henry Woodthorpe Sr.	Town Clerk of London; 1825–1842	Succeeded by Henry Alworth Merewether
