= Henry Alworth Merewether =

English serjeant-at-law

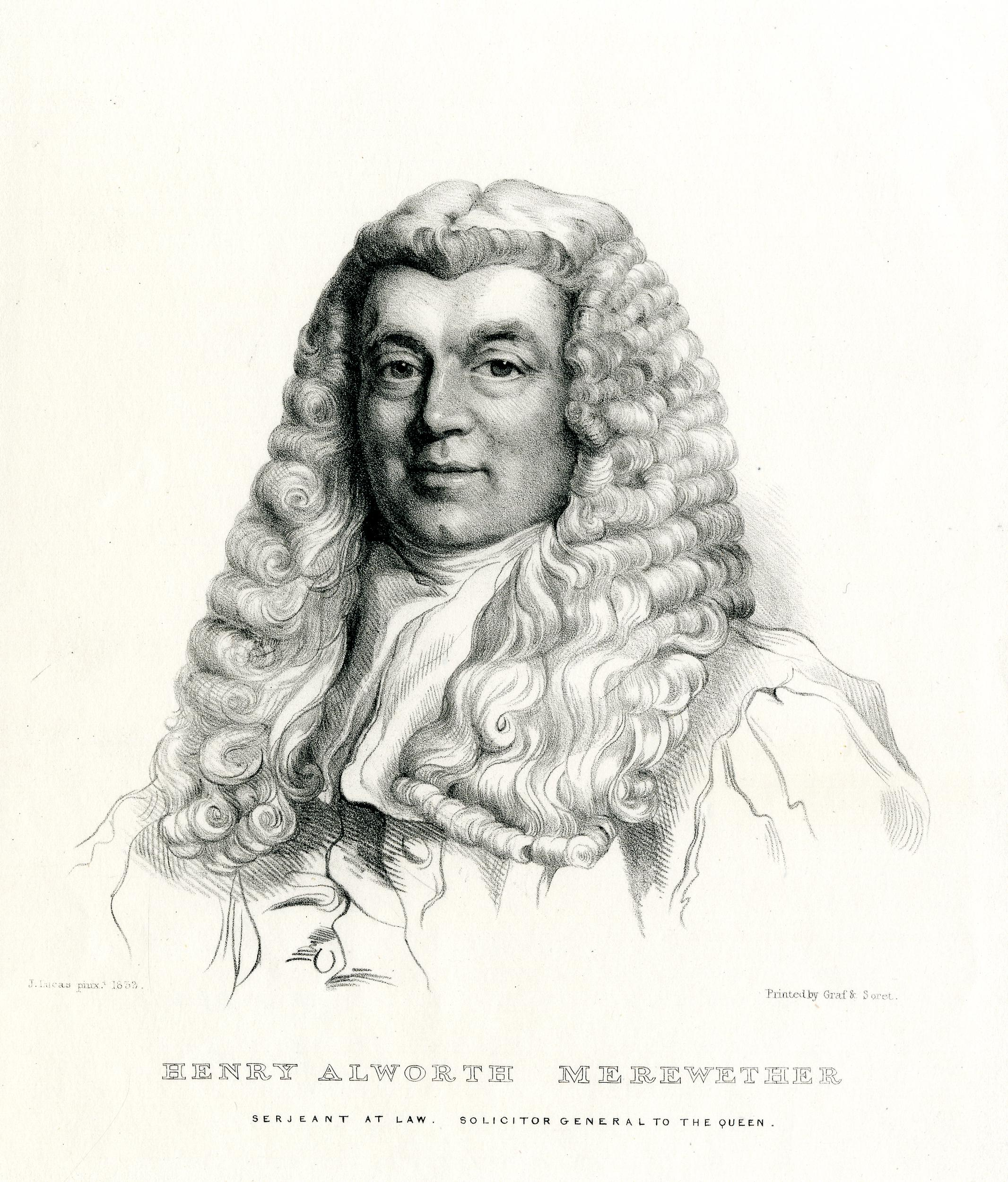
Henry Alworth Merewether

Henry Alworth Merewether (4 May 1782–1864) was an English serjeant-at-law, Town Clerk of London and author.

== Life ==
He was eldest son of Henry Merewether of Calne, Wiltshire; his brother Francis (1784–1864) was rector of Coleorton. He was educated at Reading School under Richard Valpy, was called to the bar 5 May 1809, was created serjeant-at-law 25 June 1827, and became king's counsel with patent of precedence in 1853.

Merewether practised on the western circuit with success. He was appointed recorder of Reading and was attorney-general to Adelaide, Queen-dowager. He received the degree of D.C.L. from the University of Oxford on 12 June 1839.

Elected town-clerk of London on 23 June 1842, over William Pritchard, Merewether then became high bailiff of Southwark. By accepting this appointment he lost a good income at the bar. He resigned the office of town-clerk on 10 February 1859, and died at his family seat, Castlefield, near Calne, Wiltshire, on 22 July 1864, at age 83.

== Works ==
Merewether's major work was The History of the Boroughs and Municipal Corporations of the United Kingdom (1835), written with Archibald John Stephens, and published in three volumes. He also wrote:

- A New System of Police, London, 1816.
- A Sketch of the History of Boroughs, and of the Corporate Right of Election, London, 1822.
- Report of the Case of the Borough of West Looe, London, 1823.
- An Address to the King, the Lords, and Commons on the Representative Constitution of England, London, 1830.
- The Speech … at the Bar of the House of Commons against the Bill intituled An Act to make Temporary Provision for the Government of Jamaica, London, 1839.
- The Speech … upon the Claim of the Commissioners of Woods and Forests to the Seashore, London, Dublin, 1850.

== Family ==
Merewether was twice married, and left several children. His eldest son, Henry Alworth (1812–1877), was recorder of Devizes and a bencher of the Inner Temple. His youngest son was Sir William Lockyer Merewether.

== Notes ==
Attribution

Civic offices
Preceded by Henry Woodthorpe, Jr.	Town Clerk of London; 1842–1859	Succeeded by Frederick Woodthorpe

This article incorporates text from a publication now in the public domain: Lee, Sidney, ed. (1894). "Merewether, Henry Alworth". Dictionary of National Biography. Vol. 37. London: Smith, Elder & Co.
