= Town Clerk of London =

Late Medieval compiler of London documents

Coat of arms of the City of London.

The Town Clerk of London is an important position that has existed since the 13th century in the City of London, England. Originally the role was to take the minutes of London council meetings, but over the years the holder's role has gathered responsibility, including staff and executive powers. Historically the incumbent received an annual fee of £10. This has risen to £244,000 in 2016/17, with 55% coming from the City Fund and 40% coming from the City's Cash.

== Responsibilities ==
The Town Clerk of London has been responsible for recording the minutes of the council of the Corporation of London and its committees since 1274. But historically, the Town Clerk of London's role was also one of a legal advisor and recorder of city law. The Town Clerk has worked at the Guildhall in London since 1411. Today the Guildhall is still used for official functions.

The elected City of London council assumed legislative functions and adopted financial powers as confirmed by charters of 1377 and 1383 and as written by a series of Town Clerk of London with the council approval. The council, with the Town Clerk, has amended the civic constitution, regulated the election of Lord Mayor and other officials, and amended the functions of the City of London courts via writs.

These series of changes were successful in expanding the duties of the Town Clerk position and leading to the similar expansion of the City of London courts which had jurisdiction outside London as a type of county court. This gradually took over from the now obsolete circuit criminal court called the Assize Court. The format strongly influenced the development of the High Court of Chancery and Lord Chancellor's jurisdiction based in Westminster.

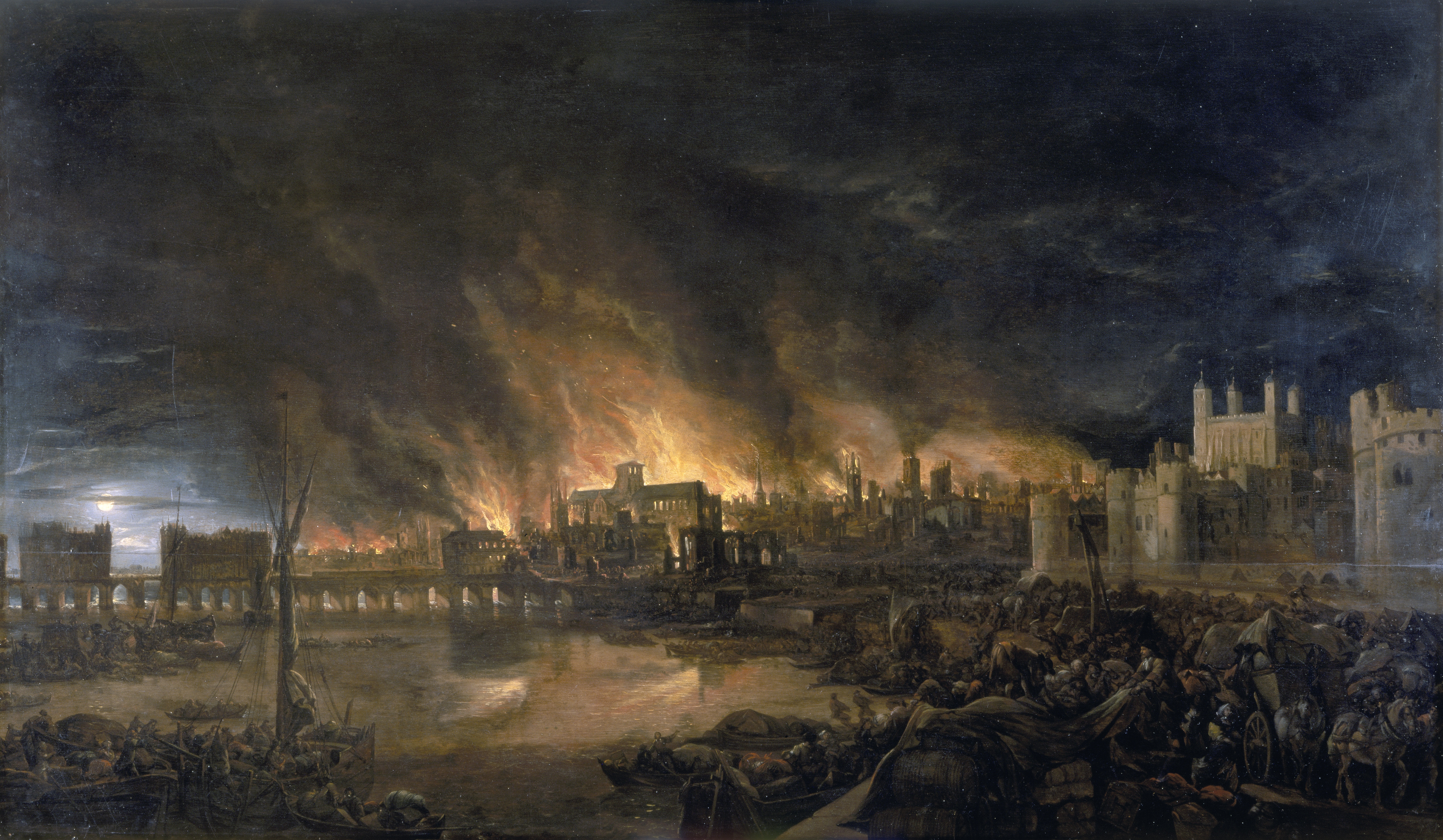
The Great Fire of London destroyed 80% of the city in 1666. The Guildhall was damaged in this and other great fires.

During the early 17th century, before and after the 1666 Great Fire of London, the Town Clerk's function began to evolve into more complex and multiple roles. The more modern era of the Town Clerk as an executive requires more assistants.

Today the Lord Mayor of the City of London is assisted in their day-to-day work by three leading personnel whose titles are the Town Clerk and Chief Executive, the Chamberlain and the Remembrancer.

== Town Clerk and Chief Executive ==
By 2009 the actual title of Town Clerk had resolved into its combined Town Clerk and Chief Executive position, which is much more than a recorder of minutes for the city council, the original role.

As of 2025, The Town Clerk and Chief Executive of the City of London is Ian Thomas, who assumed the position in February 2023. The Town Clerk's Department manages hundreds of officers and employees of the corporation.

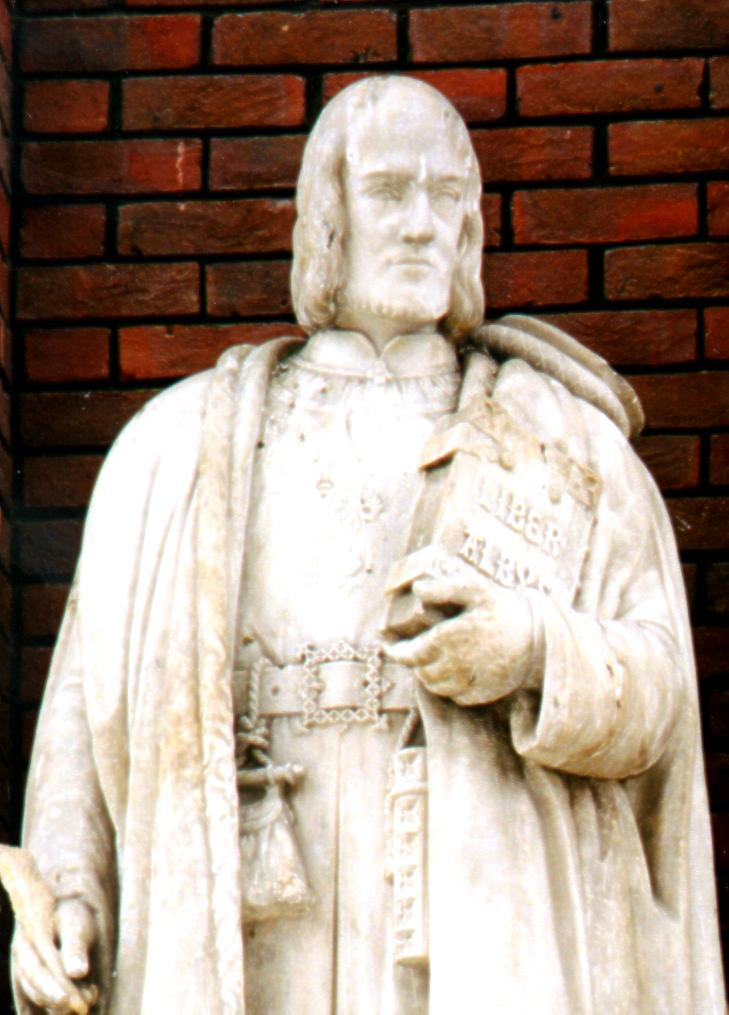
Statue of John Carpenter (1372–1442) in the City of London School

Duties include:

- Efficient management and execution of City functions.
- Primary advisor on policy and resources.
- Servicing meetings of the Court of Common Council and designated committees.
- Servicing meetings of the Court of Aldermen and designated committees.
- Investigating complaints against the city.
- Electoral Registration Officer.
- Overseer of public relations.
- Overseer of economic development.
- Overseer of human resources.

== The noted Town Clerk of London ==
John Carpenter was one of the most famous of London's town clerks, and was the author of the first book of English Common Law called Liber Albus (the White Book). The statue of John Carpenter, now residing within the City of London School, shows him holding this book. John Carpenter (1372–1442) also in 1442 bequeathed land to the Corporation of London intended to fund the maintenance and education of four boys born within the city, who would be called 'Carpenter's children'. This later became the City of London School.

== Town Clerks of London ==
This is a list of the known Town Clerks of London from 1274 to 2025, covering over 750 years:

‡ Date of election

Years served	Name	Notes
1274–1306	Ralph Crepyn, alias 'Ralph de Alegate'	Served as "clericus" or "common clerk" of the city with an absence due to serious injury and Royal inquest from 1285 to 1286 due to the murder of his assailant.
1284–1286	John de Bauquell, aka Batequell, Banquell and Bankwell	Served from 21 November 1284 to 1286 in absence of Ralph Crepyn.
1307-????	William [last name unreadable]	aka "clerk de la Gyalle"
1311–1335	Hugh de Waltham	First known elected Clerk on 20 November 1311.
25/1/1335‡-c. August 1335	Roger de Depham	Second shortest term in office.
29/8/1335‡–1354	John de Bourne	
1364?-????	John Lucas	
7/9/1368‡–1375	Henry de Padingstone	
10/8/1375‡–1399?	Henry Perot	
1399?–1417	John Marchaunt	First known to be granted a dwelling and pension (£10 per year) upon retirement.
20/4/1417‡–1438	John Carpenter	Member of Parliament (MP) 1425, 1437–1439
4/10/1438‡–1446?	Richard Barnett	
18/11/1446‡–1461	Roger Spicer, alias Tonge	First known to be dismissed from his office for offences and rebellions against King Edward IV on 5 August 1461.
2/10/1461‡–1490	William Dunthorn	
9/3/1490‡–1510	Nicholas Pakenham	
16/7/1510‡–1514	Walter Stubbe	
20/6/1514‡–1533	William Paver	First known to have committed suicide while in office
1533–1540	Thomas Ryshton, or Rysshton	Admitted 13 May 1533, granted annual pension and livery.
1540–1570	William Blackwell	Admitted 10 July 1540.
1570–1574	Anthony Stapleton	Admitted 24 July 1570
1574–1613	William Sebright	Admitted 25 May 1574. First known to have a deputy (Richard Langley) admitted to assist in office.
1613–1642	John Weld	Admitted 27 April 1613. His deputy was Robert Michell. He was later knighted for service to the Crown.
1642–1649	Robert Michell	Succeeded to office 15 September 1642 and confirmed 27 October 1642. First Deputy to assume office when required.
3/7/1649‡–1660	John Sadler	First known to be suspended from office (on 4 September 1660), then first to have suspension lifted (on 6 September 1660). He is the first known to be declared incapable of continued service (on 18 September 1660) and retired for cause.
1660–1666	Sir John Weld	Admitted 21 September 1660, first to serve two separate terms of office. His deputy (William Avery) was to succeed him on his death per contract.
1666–1672	William Avery	Admitted 12 November 1666.
9/2/1672‡–1690	William Wagstaffe	
1690–1700	John Goodfellow	Elected 17 February 1690/91
2/7/1700‡–1705	Henry Ashurst	
16/11/1705‡–1717	James Gibson	
9/5/1717‡–1724	Randolph Stracey	
1724–1737	Thomas Jackson	Elected 19 March 1723/24
1737–1757	Miles Man	First recorded "Clerk" to the Town Clerk to succeed as Town Clerk upon death, he was then elected 13 July 1737.
10/5/1757‡–1774	Sir James Hodges	Knighted c. 1760.
1774–1801	William Rix	First known Clerk to the Town Clerk to officiate during vacancy of illness of Town Clerk. He was then elected 25 November 1774
1801-1801	Edward Boxley	Former "principal clerk" appointed to fill in during vacancy on 2 September 1801 to 15 December 1801. Shortest term in office
15/12/1801‡–1825	Henry Woodthorpe, Sr.	First to have his son (Henry Woodthorpe, Jr.) to be his "principal assistant" upon election then to be his appointed deputy on 27 February 1818
6/10/1825–1842‡	Henry Woodthorpe, Jr.	First son to succeed his father in office. "The Remembrancer" appointed to officiate during vacancy of Town Clerk
23/6/1842‡–1859	Henry Alworth Merewether	
10/2/1859‡–1873	Frederick Woodthorpe	Son of Henry Woodthorpe, Jr.
17/7/1873‡–1902	Sir John Braddick Monckton	Knighted 1880. The "Remembrancer" appointed to officiate during vacancy of Town Clerk
1/5/1902‡–1935	Sir James Bell	With effect from 1 June 1902. Knighted 1911
1935–1946	Alfred Thomas Roach	Elected 13 June 1935. The "Comptroller and City Solicitor" (Anthony Frederick Ingham Pickford) appointed to officiate during vacancy of Town Clerk from November 1946
1946–1953	Sir Anthony Frederick Ingham Pickford	Elected 27 February 1947 with effect from 28 November 1946. Knighted 1949
1954–1974	Sir Edward Henry Nichols	Elected 22 October 1953 with effect from 1 January 1954. Knighted June 1982
1974–1982	Stanley James Clayton	With effect 1 April 1974
1982–1991	Geoffrey William Rowley	With effect 2 September 1982
1991–1995	Samuel Jones	With effect 23 May 1991
1996–1999	Bernard Peter Harty	No election date given
1999–2003	Tom Christopher Simmons	No election date given. Former Deputy Town Clerk
2003–2012	Chris Duffield	Served from September 2003 to 2012.
2012–2022	John Barradell	Served February 2012 to 31 December 2022. Formerly Chief Executive of Brighton & Hove City Council and Deputy Chief Executive of Westminster City Council.
2023–present	Ian Thomas	Appointed effective February 2023. Former Chief Executive of the Royal Borough of Kingston upon Thames.
