= Henry Woodthorpe Sr. =

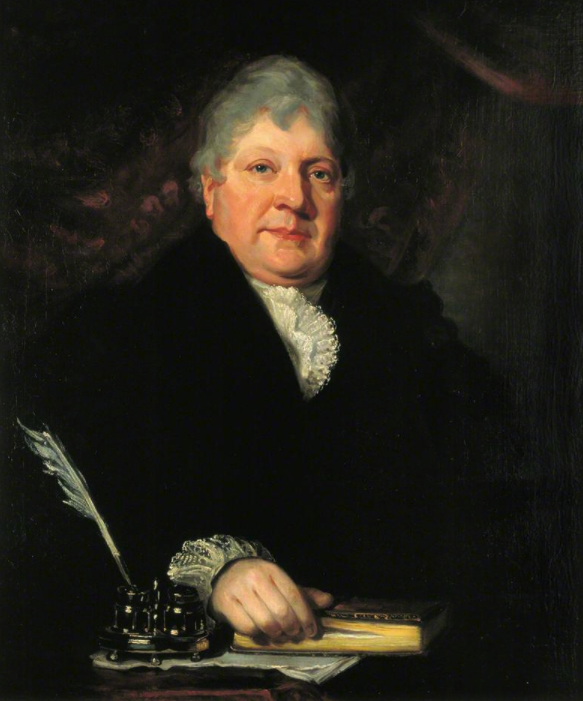
Henry Woodthorpe Sr. (unknown artist)

Henry Woodthorpe Sr. (1755 – 4 September, 1825) was Town Clerk of London from 15 December, 1801 until his death on 4 September, 1825. He was succeeded in the role by his son, Henry Woodthorpe Jr. His grandson Frederick Woodthorpe also filled the role from 10 February 1859 until 1873.

Civic offices
Preceded by Edward Boxley	Town Clerk of London; 1801–1825	Succeeded by Henry Woodthorpe Jr.
