= John Aspinall (cricketer) =

Irish cricketer

- Aspinall in May 1927.

Personal information
- Full name: John Bridge Aspinall
- Born: 13 August 1877; Inchicore, Ireland
- Died: 21 June 1932 (aged 54); Holborn, London, England

Career statistics
Competition	First-class
Matches	2
Runs scored	42
Batting average	14.00
100s/50s	0/0
Top score	20
Balls bowled	2
Wickets	0
Bowling average	–
5 wickets in innings	–
10 wickets in match	–
Best bowling	–
Catches/stumpings	1/–
- Source: Cricinfo, 26 July 2019

John Bridge Aspinall (13 August 1877 – 21 June 1932) was an Irish barrister and first-class cricketer.

== Life ==
The only son of English mechanical engineer John Aspinall, he was born in the Dublin suburb of Inchicore in August 1877; His grandfather was John Bridge Aspinall, the recorder for Liverpool. He was educated in England at Stonyhurst College, before going up to Christ Church, Oxford. After graduating from Oxford, he became a barrister.

Aspinall was the Remembrancer for the City of London from 1927 until his death in 1932. He died at his Lincoln's Inn home in June 1932.

== Cricketer ==
Aspinall toured British India with the Oxford University Authentics in 1902–03, making two first-class appearances on the tour against Bombay and the Parsees. He scored 42 in his two first-class matches, with a high score of 20.
