= City of London (Ward Elections) Act 2002 =

- Act of Parliament
- Parliament of the United Kingdom
- Long title: An Act to make further provision with respect to the qualification of voters at ward elections in the city of London; and for connected purposes.
- Citation: 2002 c. vi
- Introduced by: Peter Brooke MP (Commons); Lord Jenkin of Roding (Lords)

Dates
- Royal assent: 7 November 2002

Text of statute as originally enacted

The City of London (Ward Elections) Act 2002 (c. vi) was a local act passed by the United Kingdom Parliament on 7 November 2002. Whereas throughout the rest of the United Kingdom the business vote had been abolished, in the City of London this act not only retained it but greatly increased it, so that it came to outnumber the residential vote.

When the legislation was passed, the franchise was extended to 32,500 businesses compared to 6,000 resident electors.

== Historical background ==
The Municipal Corporations Act 1835 was part of the reform programme brought in by the Whigs and following Reform Act 1832. While the latter had abolished most of the rotten boroughs for parliamentary purposes, the 1835 act applied the similar reforms in terms of local government to 178 boroughs. Over the next fifty years various unreformed boroughs were affected by successive pieces of legislation. However, none of these affected the City of London Corporation. When the local government of London was reorganised by the London Government Act 1899, the City of London was again excluded. Likewise, the City of London was unaffected by the London Government Act 1963.

== Criticism ==
The legislation was criticised by Labour MP, John McDonnell, for being undemocratic.
