= Scribe D =

Professional scribe

The Trinity Gower D Scribe (fl. 1390–1420), often referred to simply as Scribe D, was a professional scribe and copyist of literary manuscripts active during the late fourteenth and early fifteenth century in London, England. Although his real name long remained unknown, Scribe D has been described as "so well known to students of late Middle English manuscripts that he hardly needs any introduction".

== Identification and conjectured biography ==
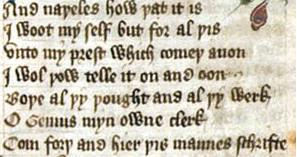
"Anglicana formata at its best": the hand of Scribe D, from BL. MS. Egerton 1991 (Confessio Amantis).

Scribe D was first identified in the 1970s by Ian Doyle and Malcolm Parkes, who noticed that the same scribal hand occurred in a range of prestige manuscripts of the late fourteenth and early fifteenth century date. The hand has been characterised as "Anglicana formata at its best"; restrained, traditional and rather austere, with a slight influence of secretary hand. The manuscripts in which this hand appears show that Scribe D was active between the 1390s and 1420s.

The spellings used by Scribe D have suggested to some critics that his original dialect was that of the south-west Midlands of England, particularly north Worcestershire; Kerby-Fulton has suggested that Scribe D can be regarded as one of a class of "'reasonably educated men' who came up from the provinces seeking their fortunes, Dick Whittington style". More recent scholarship has proposed he was in fact a Londoner influenced by his extensive work with manuscripts from the south-west Midlands, such as those of Langland. His particular specialisation in the works of John Gower seems to have resulted in him picking up several unusual word forms used by Gower, who had a London ("East Midlands") dialect with idiosyncratic Suffolk and Kent influences, and subsequently using them when copying the works of Geoffrey Chaucer.

One of Scribe D's earliest identified works, based on the style of the illumination used in the manuscript, is the important "C text" of William Langland's Piers Plowman, contained in University of London MS. v.88. This contains scribal editing of "real skill" in addition to unique material written either by a "Langland enthusiast" or Langland himself. It may be significant that Scribe D's first surviving commission was for Piers Plowman, a work written in the same south-west Midland dialect that he could have spoken himself.

Once established in London, Scribe D may have worked with other professional scribes. He is known to have worked on the same manuscript, the "Trinity Gower" manuscript, as the scribe of the Ellesmere and Hengwrt manuscripts of the Canterbury Tales and either both men or the bookseller they worked for seem to have had good links to the London literary world, being able to obtain high-quality draft copies of texts. Another of the scribes working on the Trinity Gower was Thomas Hoccleve, himself a poet and an admirer (and possibly friend) of Chaucer.

Some scholars, such as Estelle Stubbs, have argued that Scribe D and his colleagues may, rather than trying to assemble the Canterbury Tales after Chaucer's death in 1400, have been steadily revising and recopying manuscripts in several stages with possible authorial supervision or input.

In recent years, Scribe D has been tentatively identified by Mooney and Stubbs as John Marchaunt, active as Town Clerk of London between 1380 and 1417; in 2018, however, Lawrence Warner argued that the Marchaunt identification had no evidentiary support: there are no substantial documents known to be in Marchaunt's hand with which to compare these records, which seem to have been identified as Scribe D's on the assumption that he was Marchaunt rather than the other way around. Mooney and Stubbs also cite the appearance of the name 'Jhon Marcant' in the margin of a Canterbury Tales manuscript by Scribe D as evidence that a later reader knew who the scribe was, but both this and a second marginal entry ('Jhon Marka') in the manuscript appear next to passages concerning jealousy and thus provide no evidence regarding the scribe's identity.

== Manuscripts attributed to Scribe D ==
- London University Library v. 88 (the so-called "Ilchester manuscript" of Piers Plowman, regarded as possibly Scribe D's earliest work).
- Cambridge, Trinity R.3.2 (quires 9, 15–19) (Confessio Amantis)
- British Library, Egerton 1991 (Confessio Amantis)
- Columbia University, Plimpton 265 (Confessio Amantis)
- Oxford, Bodley 294 (Confessio Amantis)
- Oxford, Bodley 902 (Confessio Amantis)
- Oxford, Christ Church 148 (Confessio Amantis)
- Princeton, Taylor 5 (Confessio Amantis)
- British Library, Add. 27944 (John Trevisa's translation of De proprietatibus rerum)
- British Library, Harley MS. 7334 (Canterbury Tales)
- Oxford, Corpus Christi 198 (Canterbury Tales)
