= City's Cash =

Endowment fund of the City of London

Coat of Arms of the Corporation of the City of London

City's Cash is an endowment fund, overseen by the City of London Corporation, built up over 800 years and passed from generation to generation to fund services that the Corporation claims benefit London and the nation as a whole. It is one of three funds run by the City of London Corporation, the other two being the City Fund and the Bridge House Estates.

The City of London's right to acquire any "wastes and open spaces" gave rise to the City's Cash estate. Its core holding is a 35-acre (14-hectare) estate within the "Square Mile", including the Old Bailey, sections of New Broad Street, Whitefriars and Fenchurch Street, plus the markets of Smithfield and Leadenhall. Billingsgate market, although now outside the City, also forms part of the Cash estate.

== History ==
The City's Cash account has been regarded as being as old as the City of London Corporation itself, but the oldest remaining set of accounts date from Michaelmas 1632–Michaelmas 1633. These were the seventh set of accounts presented by Robert Bateman who had been Chamberlain of London since 1626. They were audited by Nicholas Rainton, who was at that time Lord Mayor.

The City's Cash was used to supplement the Police Rate, which had been authorised in the City of London Police Acts 1839 and 1919 to cover the costs of the City of London Police. However owing to problems in the management of the funds, the City of London had to ask the government to contribute a grant for the upkeep of their police force. In the year ending 31 March 1938, the City's Cash balance sheet totalled over £6.5 million, while income from the estate and other sources was estimated at over £850,000.

== Public scrutiny ==
In 2012, in response to pressure from Occupy London, the City of London Corporation released some information about the account, where the money came from and what it gets spent on. It proved to contain more than £1.319 billion. With an income, in 2012, of £145 million, 29% of which came from school fees, with a further eight per cent coming from rents and nine per cent coming from grants, reimbursements and contributions. However, the largest source of revenue was 52 per cent from investments. By the end of March 2016, it had net assets of £2.3 billion, while Andrew Duncan said the Cash estate generated a "reasonably respectable £210 million a year."

The City's Cash Financial Statements are prepared in accordance with Financial Reporting Standard 102 (FRS 102) as issued by the Financial Reporting Council and the external auditor's opinion confirms that the statements give a ‘true and fair view’ of the state of City's Cash. A detailed City's Cash Overview summary statement is published along with other accounts on the City of London website.

== Uses of fund ==
The City's Cash published account summary details how the funds are used to provide services that are of importance nationally and internationally as well as to the City and Greater London.

=== Open spaces ===
The City of London Corporation looks after 11,000 acres of open spaces across London. Some of the sites have been owned and managed by the City of London Corporation since 1870 to protect them from development and preserve them as a natural resource. Many sites have gained national Green Flag and Green Heritage Awards, are Sites of Special Scientific Interest or are important wildlife habitats. Some sites are national nature reserves for the public to enjoy. Annual visits to these open spaces are currently estimated at 23 million.

=== The Lord Mayor's activities ===
All of the Lord Mayor's activities are paid for through the City's Cash.

=== The City of London markets ===
The wholesale markets currently operated by the City of London Corporation are Smithfield and Billingsgate (both of which are funded by City's Cash), plus New Spitalfields (accounted for in the City Fund). The City of London Corporation retains its property interests in the former markets of Leadenhall and Old Spitalfields, but these are not managed by its Department of Markets and Consumer Protection.

=== The City Remembrancer ===
The City's Cash is also used to fund the Office of the City Remembrancer, an official with responsibilities for representing the City of London and its interests to Parliament.

=== Subsidised refreshments ===
The Members Bar in the Guildhall is a subsidised facility for members of the Court of Common Council and the Court of Aldermen. Access to the facilities is an entitlement for life even after an individual is no longer a member of either court. Members can also entertain guests there. With spirits available for as little as 60p, in October 2017, it was substantially cheaper than any other bar in the City of London. In 2016, over £200,000 was allocated for a refurbishment of the club. Catering and bar costs here amounted to more than £0.5 million in 2016, partly offset by income from hiring for private events.
