= McMurran =

McMurran is a surname. Notable people with the surname include:

- John T. McMurran (1801–1866), American planter, lawyer, and state legislator
- Lewis McMurran (1914–1989), American state legislator

== See also ==
- McMurrin
- McMorran
