= Bassishaw =

Ward of the City of London

Coordinates: 51.51649°N 0.0926°W

- Ward
- Location within Greater London
- Bassishaw ward boundaries since 2013
- OS grid reference: TQ325815
- Sui generis: City of London
- Administrative area: Greater London
- Region: London
- Country: England
- Sovereign state: United Kingdom
- Post town: LONDON
- Postcode district: EC2
- Dialling code: 020
- Police: City of London
- Fire: London
- Ambulance: London
- UK Parliament: Cities of London and Westminster
- London Assembly: City and East

Bassishaw is one of the 25 wards of the City of London, with the City forming the historic and financial centre of Greater London, England. While all 25 wards within the small, 1.12 sq mi (2.90 km^{2}), City are themselves small, Bassishaw is historically the City's smallest. It is bounded by four wards: Coleman Street, east; Cheap, south; Cripplegate, north; Aldersgate, west.

It first consisted of Basinghall Street with the courts and short side streets off it, but since a boundary review in 2003 (after which the ward expanded into Cripplegate Within) it extends to streets further west, including Aldermanbury, Wood Street, and, to the north, part of London Wall and St Alphage Garden.

== History ==
=== Toponymy ===
The ward is named for Basinghall, the mansion house of the Bassing (or Basing) family, who were prominent in the City beginning in the 13th century. King Henry III granted Adam de Basing "certain houses in Aldermanbury and in Milk-street; the advowson of the church at Bassings hall; with other liberties and privileges". John Leake's 1667 map of the City of London refers to the ward as "Basinghall ward".

=== Guilds and churches ===
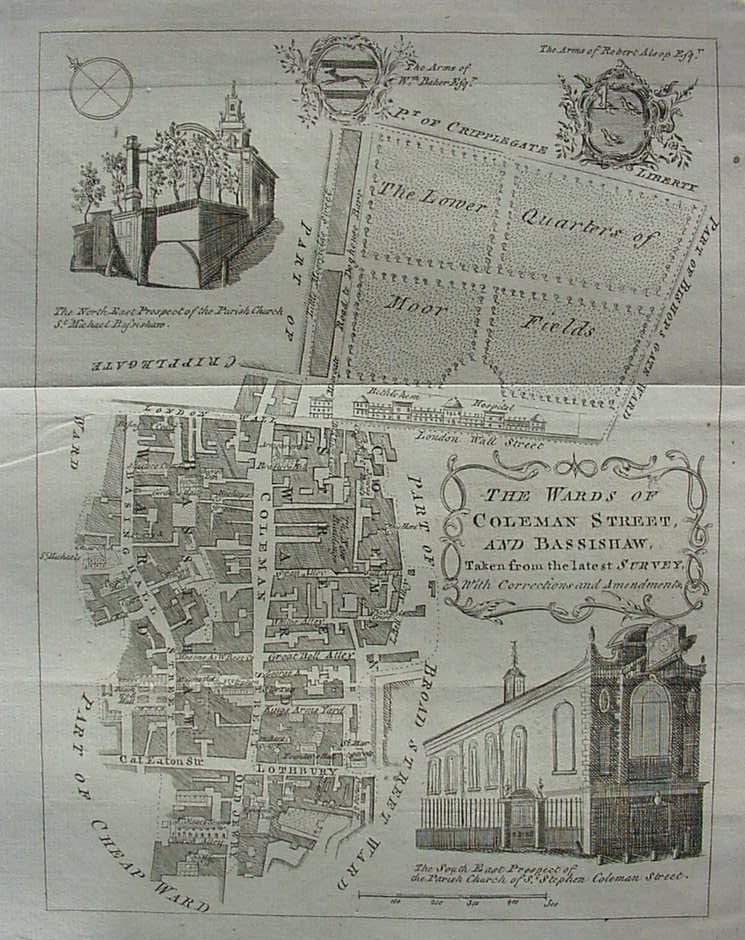
Cole's 1755 map of Bassishaw ward.

In this ward was a weekly cloth market, authorised by King Richard III. The coopers' guild hall was first founded in this ward in 1522, at The Swan, a public house, and, from 1547, their purpose-built hall. Their hall was destroyed in the Great Fire of London in 1666 but later rebuilt in situ. They rebuilt again in 1865, selling a part of the site to the City of London Corporation for the expansion of the Guildhall. This hall was destroyed by fire on the night of 29 December 1940.

The masons' hall was constructed in 1463 in Mason's Avenue which today is a southern limit. Their hall was also sold to the Corporation in 1865. The weavers and girdlers also had their guild halls in the ward. The modern livery halls of the pewterers, salters and brewers are in Bassishaw.

There were two churches, neither of which remain. St Michael Bassishaw, dedicated to St Michael, the archangel, which was founded in the 12th century. At that time, the rectorship was included in the gift of St Bartholomew-the-Great, but, over time, it came to be associated with St Paul's Cathedral itself. The church was destroyed in the Great Fire of London, and rebuilt in 1679. It was united with St Lawrence Jewry in 1897; the site was sold in 1899 and the church was demolished in 1900. St Alphage London Wall, also damaged in the Great Fire but not rebuilt until 1777, was eventually demolished in 1924.

== Points of interest ==
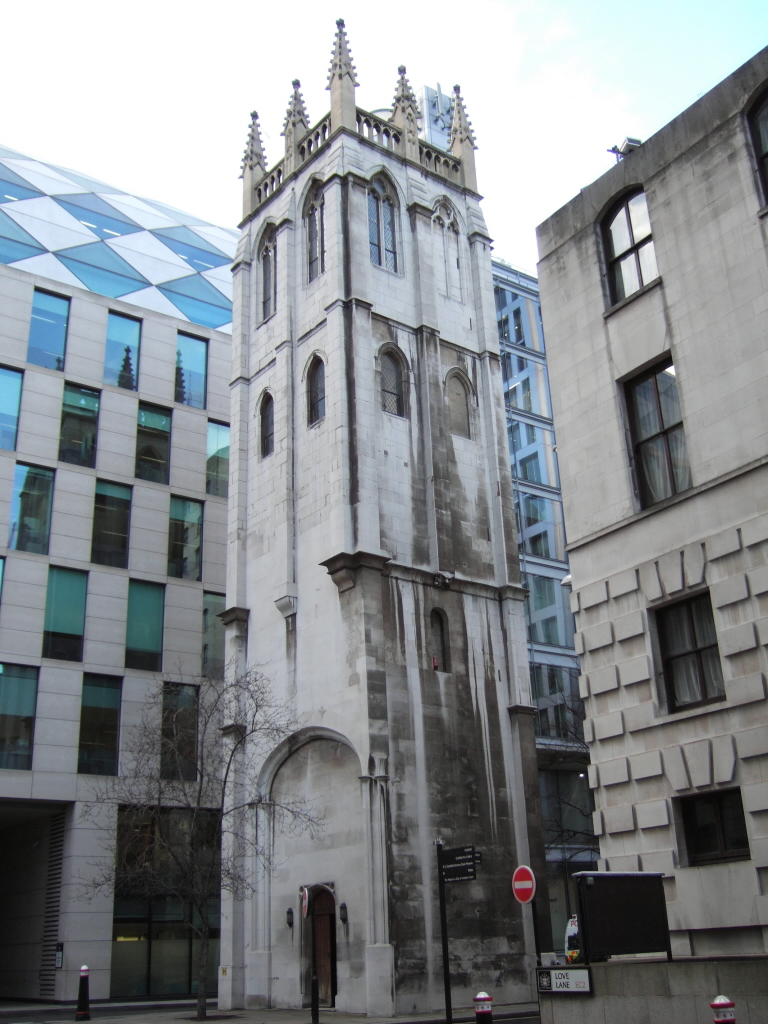
The Tower on Wood Street.

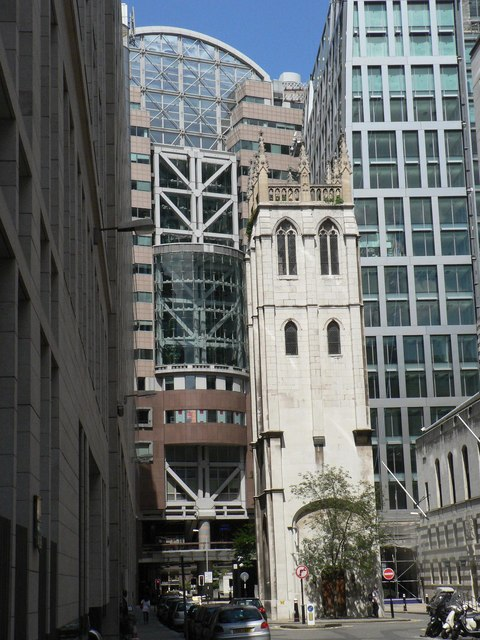
View up Wood Street.

The ward contains a large part of the Guildhall buildings, the main administrative centre for the City of London Corporation. (A small, but important, part of the Guildhall lies within Cheap ward.) The Guildhall Art Gallery and Guildhall Library both lie in Bassishaw, as part of the Guildhall buildings.

Also in the ward is Wood Street police station, the former headquarters of the City of London Police (not to be confused with the Metropolitan Police Service whose headquarters are at Scotland Yard). It used to host a small police museum, which relocated in 2016 to the Guildhall Library, replacing the Clockmakers' Museum and Library.

The prominently motifed Chartered Insurance Institute at 20 Aldermanbury has its own hall (Insurance Hall) and a small museum. The building itself is Grade-II listed.

== Pedestrian route ==
Aldermanbury has broad pavements and remains a pedestrian link from Gresham Street to the road aspect of, the main successor of, London Wall.

== Politics ==
Bassishaw is one of 25 wards in the City of London, each electing an alderman to the Court of Aldermen and commoners (the City equivalent of a councillor) to the Court of Common Council of the City of London Corporation. Only electors who are Freemen of the City of London are eligible to stand for election, though all candidates who stand are granted this status.

== Notable people ==
- Camilla Dufour Crosland (1812–1895), writer of fiction, poetry, essays
- Philip Rashleigh (1729–1811), politician and antiquary

== See also ==
- St Mary Aldermanbury
