= Police station =

Facility that serves to accommodate police officers

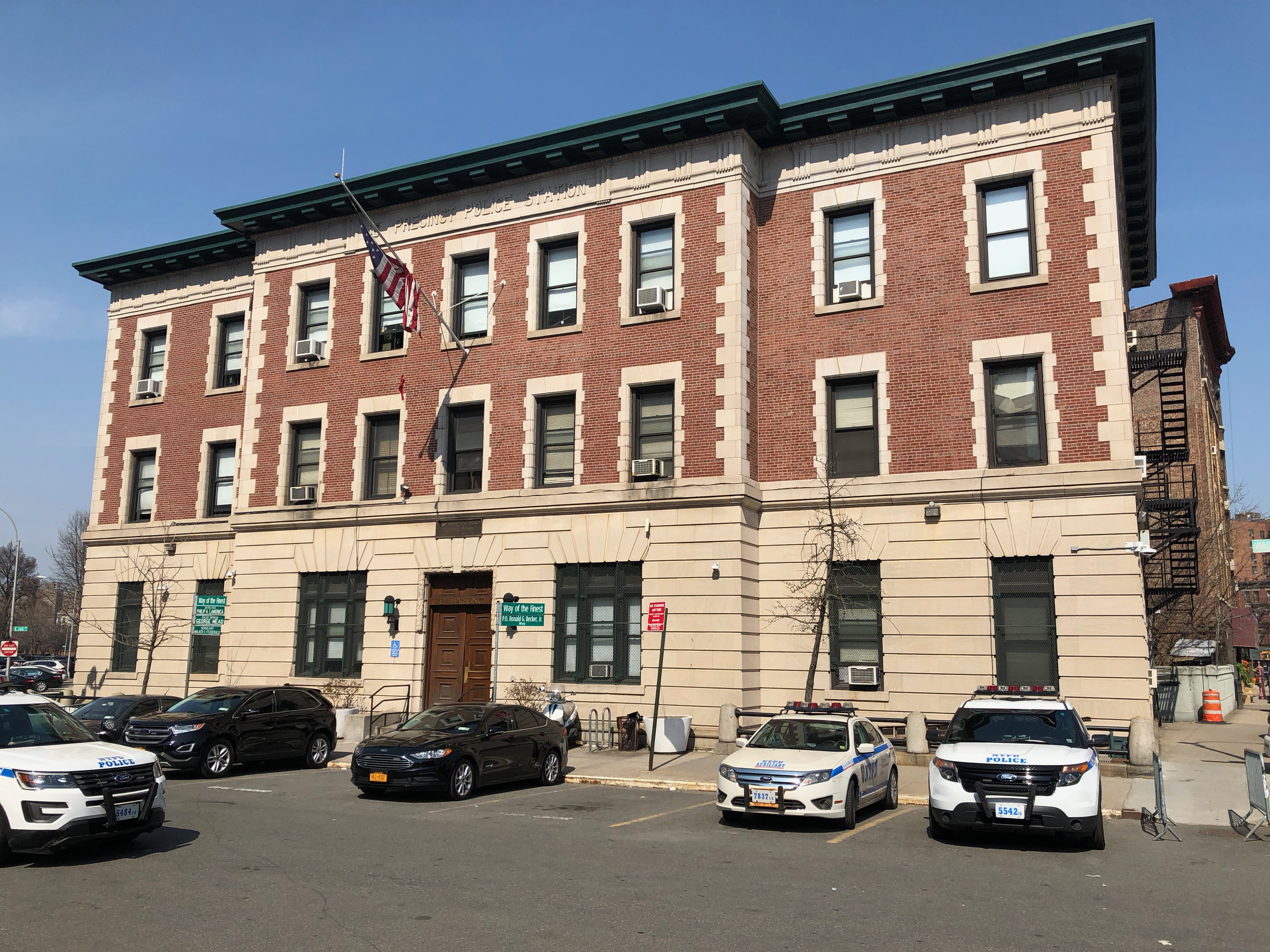
The New York City Police Department's 42nd Precinct in The Bronx, New York City

A police station is a facility operated by police or a similar law enforcement agency that serves to accommodate police officers and other law enforcement personnel. The role served by a police station varies by agency, type, and jurisdiction, but in larger agencies there may be multiple police stations that serve as regional or area sub-headquarters for personnel assigned to certain beats, administrative divisions, or police units, while in smaller agencies there may be fewer stations or even one singular police headquarters.

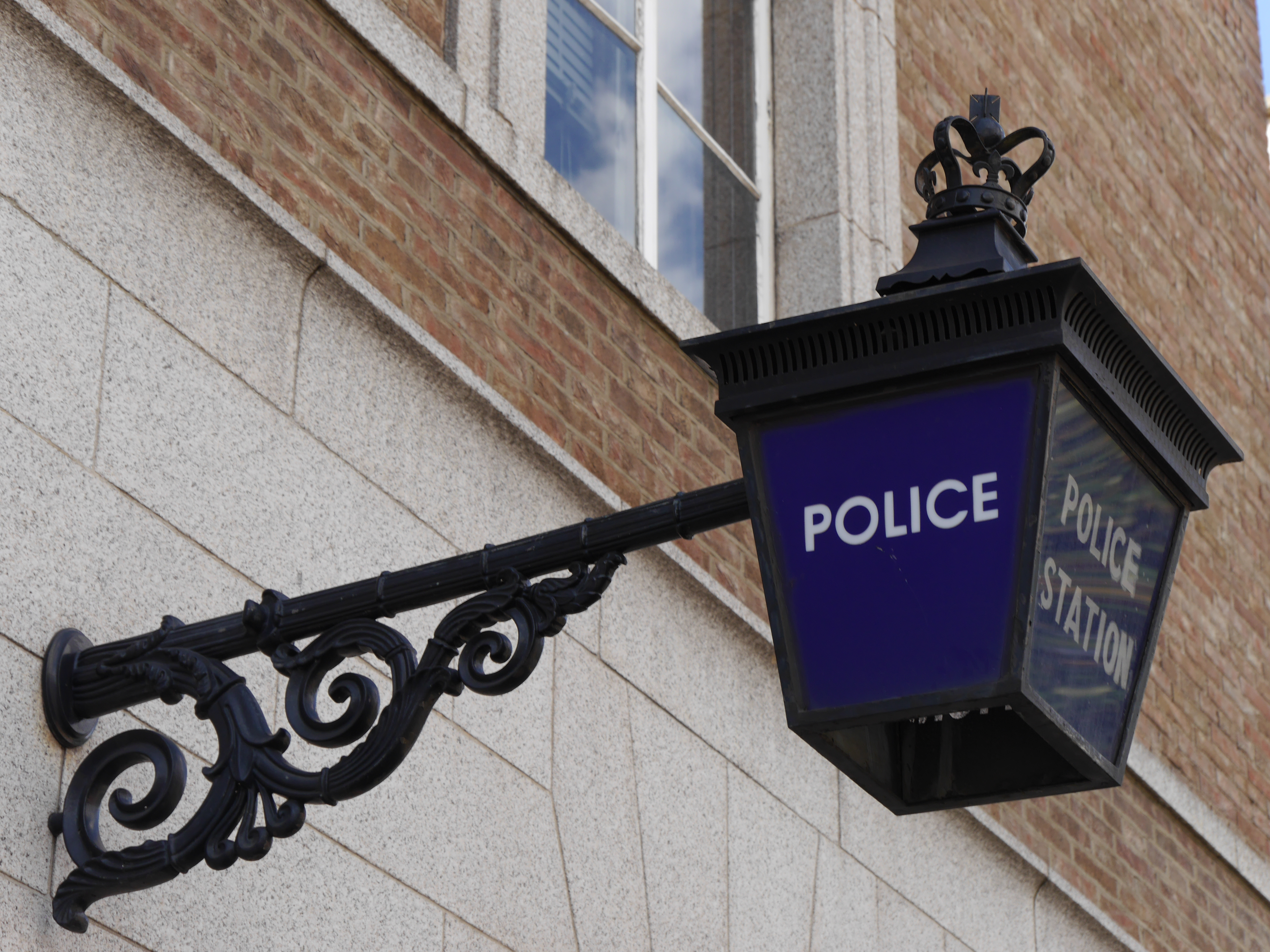
A blue police-marked lamp outside the Metropolitan Police's Hammersmith Police Station in London, England. Such lamps have traditionally been used to mark police stations in the British Isles.

== Names ==
While "police station" is the most generic term, individual law enforcement agencies tend to have specific names for their stations, including:

- Barracks, used by American state police and highway patrol agencies, as well as in Ireland
- District office, used by American state police and highway patrol agencies, as well as some municipal agencies like the Calgary Police Service
- Precinct house or precinct, used by some large American urban police departments such as the New York City Police Department, Memphis Police Department, and Newark Police Department, where stations are in charge of precincts
- Police center or police centre
- Police complex
- Police house
- Police office, especially in Scotland
- Station house
- Substation, usually smaller stations that may have less facilities than regular stations, or an alternate term for normal stations used by American county sheriffs
- Detachment, used by some state, provincial, and national police forces
- Thana (Sanskrit: थाना), used in the Indian subcontinent

Multiple informal names exist as well, such as "cop shop", "cophouse", or "nick". Regardless, "station" and "precinct" are most commonly used in media and public discourse irrespective of an agency's specific terminology.

The placement of a police station in regards to an agency's organization varies. For example, in Ireland, the Garda Síochána operates small sub-district stations serving towns and villages, district headquarters serving the largest town in a Garda district, divisional headquarters serving the largest city in a Garda division, and the Garda headquarters itself in Phoenix Park, Dublin; each of these oversees the one beneath them down to sub-district stations. Similarly, the Ontario Provincial Police operates 165 detachments of various sizes, five regional headquarters covering different regions of Ontario that oversee these detachments, a divisional headquarters dedicated to road traffic safety, and the Ontario Provincial Police Headquarters itself in Orillia.

The jurisdiction a police station serves has a variety of different names, such as beat, precinct, district, division, area, and zone. However, in some agencies such as the Hampshire and Isle of Wight Constabulary, police stations are not limited to a specific area and officers have greater flexibility over where they can operate within their agency's jurisdiction.

== Facilities ==
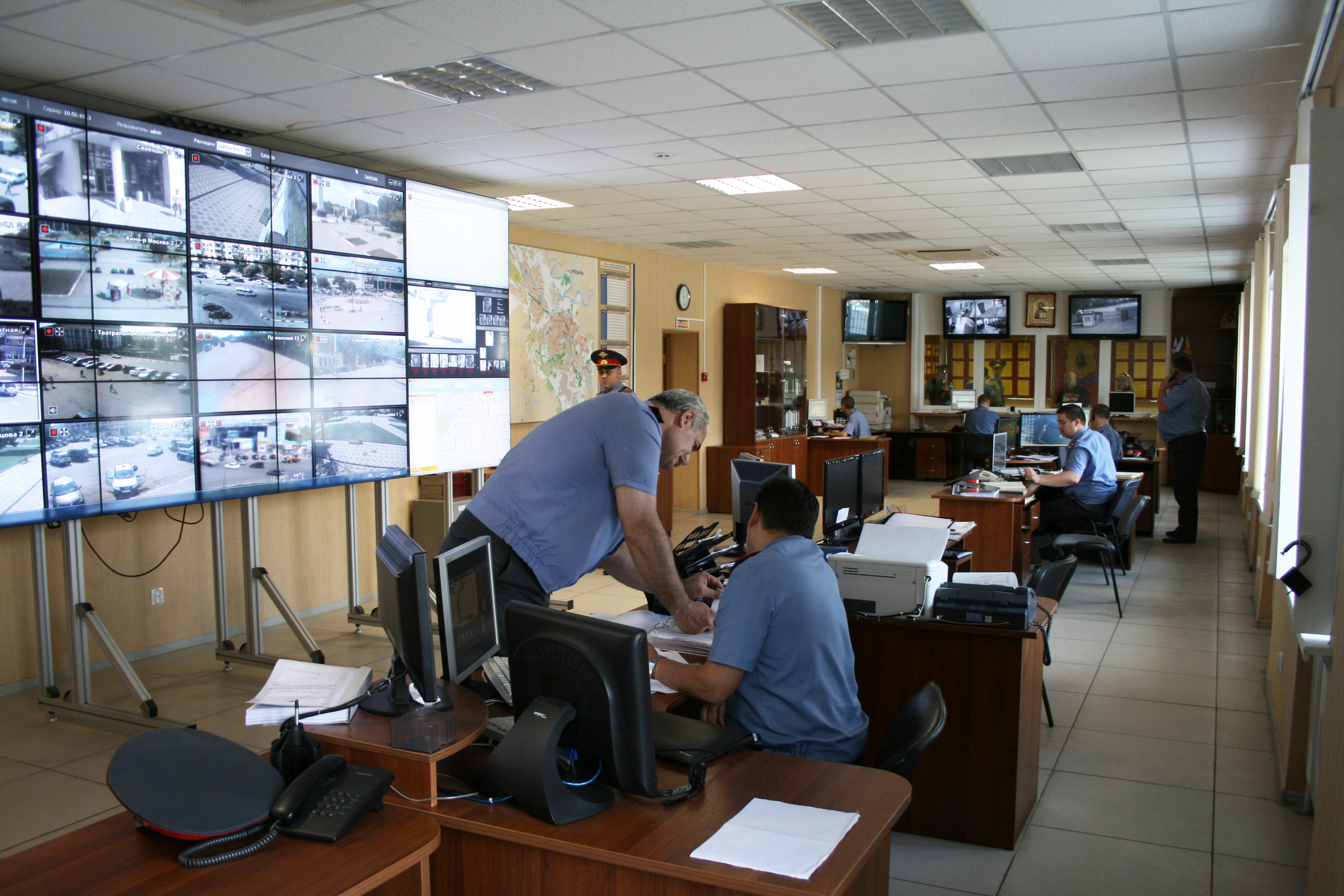
The office of a Russian Police station

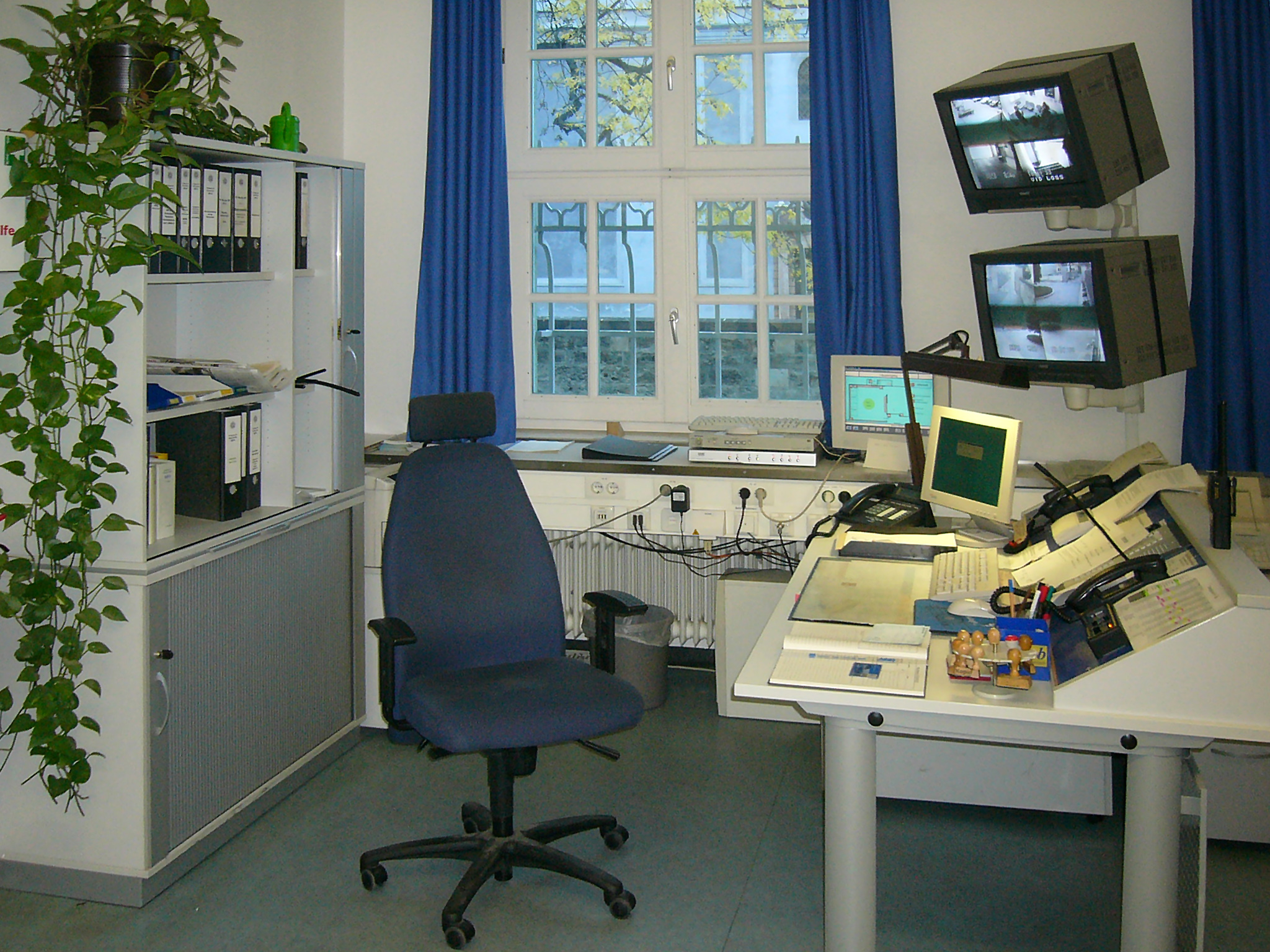
The desk of a Polizeipräsidium München sergeant

Police stations typically feature office space for personnel to work, a reception area for public visitors, holding cells for temporarily confining detainees (the area these cells are in is called a custody suite in the United Kingdom), locker rooms for personnel use, storage rooms that may serve various purposes (such as an evidence room for holding evidence, an armory for storing issued weaponry and ammunition, or simple storage of equipment and supplies), and parking for police vehicles, among others. Unlike fire stations, the officers and personnel assigned to police stations typically do not live in the station itself.

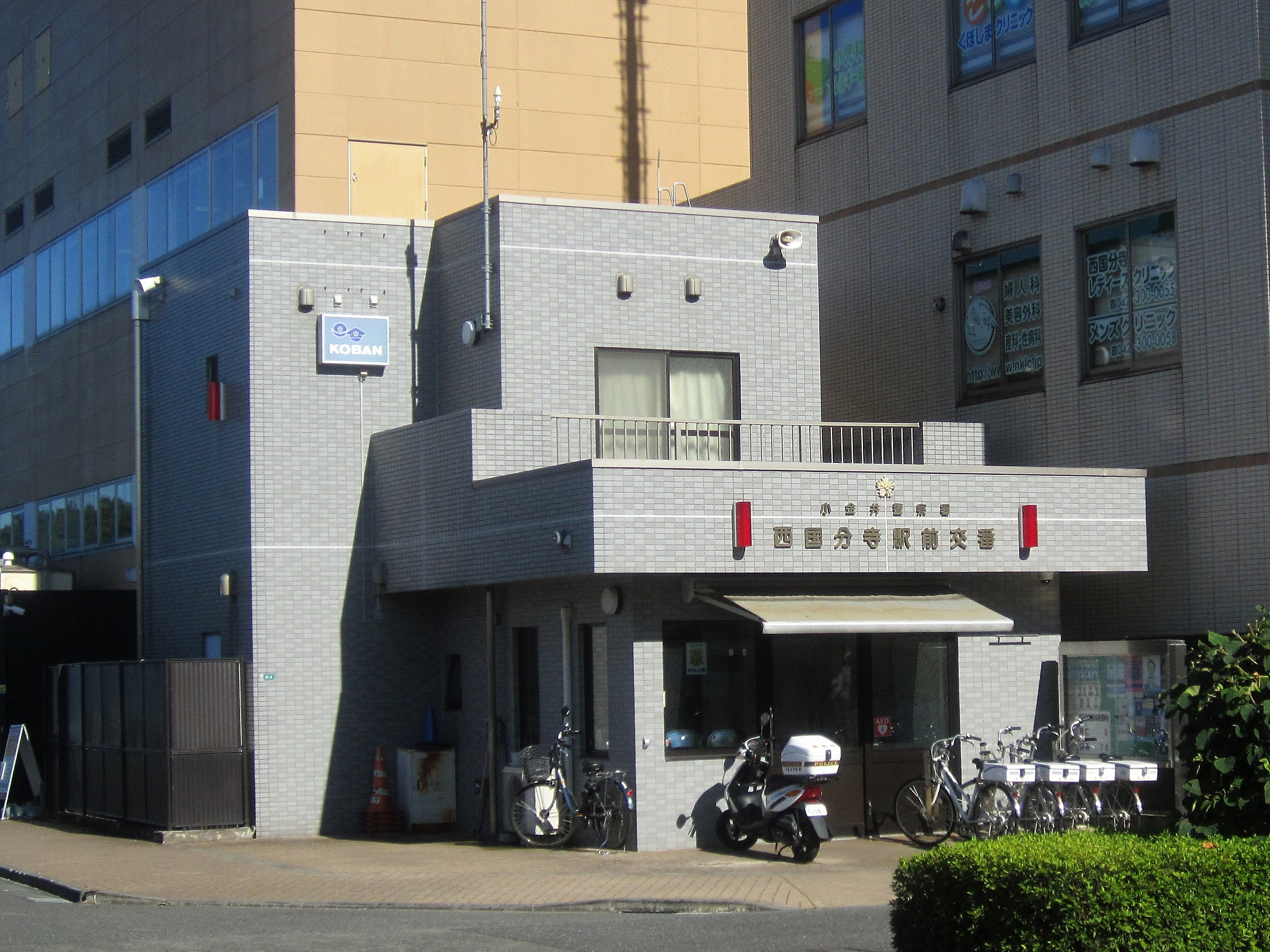
A Tokyo Metropolitan Police Department kōban in Kokubunji, Tokyo

However, these facilities ultimately depend on the agency's needs, the station building's size, and the station's intended role. Some agencies operate specialized police stations meant for specific purposes that may have less facilities or different facilities available. For example:

- Some police stations may not be community-oriented and may instead serve solely as a police workspace without a reception area, with members of the public instead directed to other police stations that do have these facilities.
- Some police units have their own dedicated stations, usually for jurisdiction-wide special units that operate better from one dedicated facility instead of existing stations or the agency's headquarters. For instance, the Los Angeles Police Department's Metropolitan Division operates its own station in Westlake.
- Some agencies operate "mobile police stations" operated out of step vans and trucks to provide police presence and administrative services at major events, akin to mobile command centers.
- In Japan, prefectural police operate kōban, compact police stations with less facilities and less officers assigned to them (sometimes solely consisting of an office and reception area). Kōban are primarily intended to provide permanent police presence in neighborhoods; police stations are the central administrative facilities that oversee these kōban.
- In the Canadian province of Ontario, several police services operate "collision reporting centers", special-purpose police facilities where motorists involved traffic collisions must go to file police reports.
- Some police forces in India, Latin America, and Africa operate women's police stations, which specialize in handling crimes with female victims, such as violence against women and sex crimes.
- The Dubai Police Force operates "Smart Police Stations" in high-traffic locations that are virtually-staffed; instead of having physical officers present, members of the public can use interactive kiosks to file reports, apply for permits and certifications, or speak with officers via videotelephony. The concept was introduced in 2017, and since the 2020s similar virtually-staffed stations have been introduced in the Netherlands and Serbia.

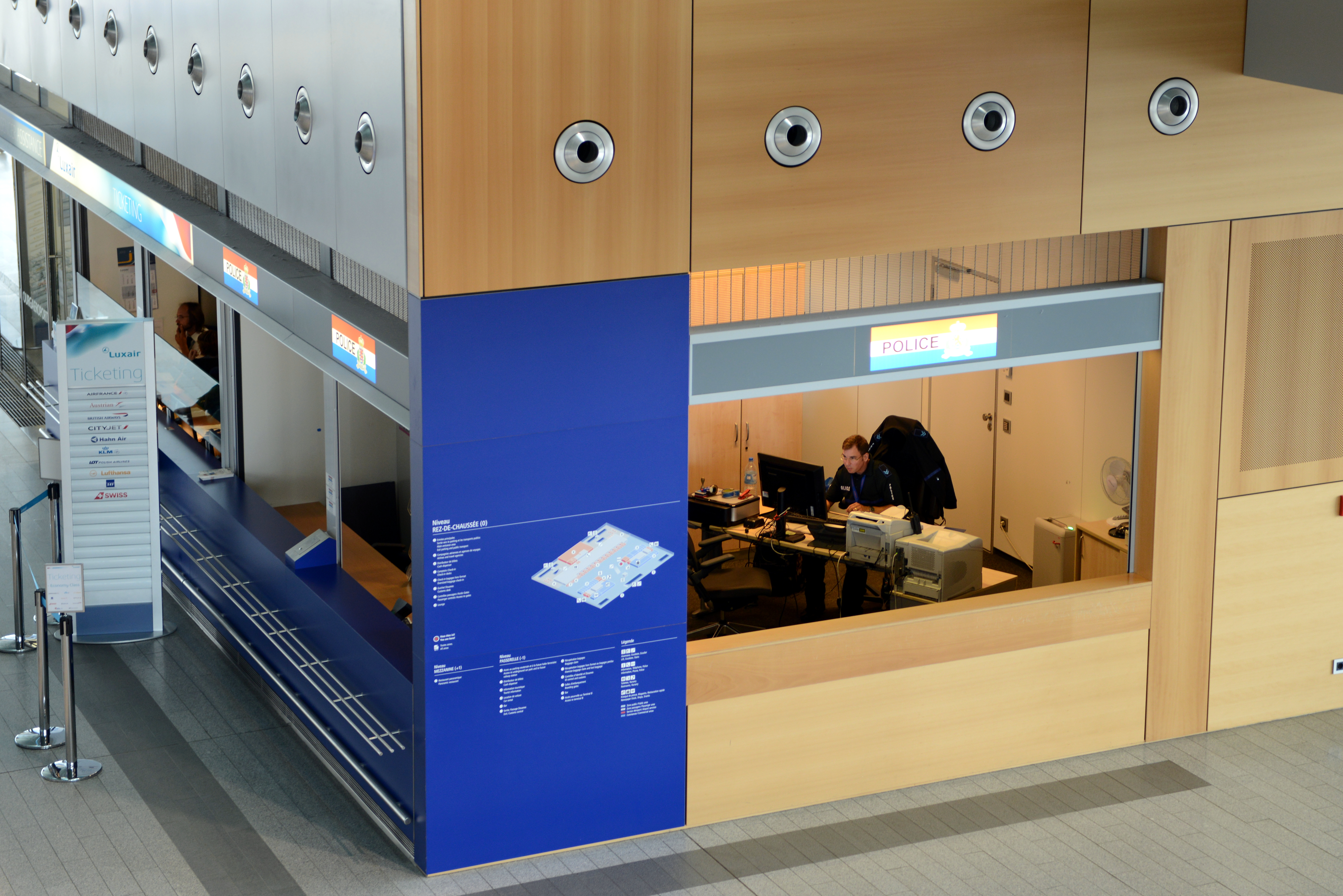
A Grand Ducal Police substation at Luxembourg Airport

Most police stations are their own standalone buildings, though again, this tends to vary based on the agency's size, jurisdiction, and purpose. In some smaller towns in the United States, police stations may be combined with town halls, courthouses, or fire stations (these are sometimes called "municipal buildings" or "public safety buildings"). Some stations may be placed in high-traffic locations where a larger police presence is preferred such as shopping centers, airports, or train stations, unless these facilities have their own law enforcement agencies such as airport police.

== By country ==
=== Greece ===
There are 1,024 police stations and directorates in the Greek territory, each of them is responsible for the safety of the citizens in their area. They usually have parking areas for vehicles, interrogation areas and holding cells.

=== India ===
In India, police stations are referred to as "thana" or "thane". The term thana is derived from the Persian word sthan, which means a place or location. The British colonial administration adopted this term, and it has been widely used ever since. There are regional variations, such as Kāval nilaiyam in Tamil Nadu, etc. Police stations have a designated area under their jurisdiction. Police stations are headed by a station house officer (SHO) who may be of inspector (P.I.) or sub-inspector (S.I) rank, assisted by an assistant sub-inspector (A.S.I.), head constables (H.C.), and constables (P.C.). The number of personnel in a particular police station depends on many factors like area covered, population, topography, crime rate, sensitivity, important places and others. Some police stations may have police outposts under them. Police outposts are set up when areas covered by police stations have difficult topography, a lack of transportation, high population density, communally sensitive places and border points, or if the area is very large. There are many police stations in India which lack basic infrastructure like proper buildings, landline telephones, wireless sets, vehicles, computers and adequate police personnel. Specialized police stations also exist for specific purposes, such as cyber crime, railway, traffic enforcement, and women. Some of the police stations in India (Bharat) may have police checkposts under their jurisdiction to monitor traffic, check movement of contraband, for patrolling and beat duties, to prevent or control communal disturbances or other criminal activities, places where large number of people congregate| and also during elections. These police checkposts may be permanent or temporary in nature depending on the ground situation among many others. As on 1 February 2026 there are 17798 police stations across different states and union territories of India

=== Ireland ===
The police stations (or barracks) of the Garda Síochána come in the following types, in ascending order of size:

- Sub-district stations: Stations in small towns and villages, led by an officer who is no higher in rank than a sergeant. Since the 1980s, many of these small stations have been closed or reduced to operating part-time.
- District headquarters: Located in the largest town in a Garda district, with the most senior officer being a superintendent.
- Divisional headquarters: Located in the largest town or city within a Garda division, which in turn comprises multiple districts. The most senior officer is a chief superintendent.
- Garda headquarters: Located in Phoenix Park, Dublin and includes the office of the Garda Commissioner, as well as other senior officers.

=== Iran ===
FARAJA police command established in 2022 replaced NAJA police force has provincial and county commands, Police electronic offices are called Police +10 (پلیس+۱۰). Iranian cities needs 2000 more police stations/bases per deputy command. There are four thousand patrols.

=== United Kingdom ===
The county constabularies in Great Britain were previously organised on a village basis. Most villages of any size had a "police house". Police houses in small villages were often staffed by a single uniformed constable, with larger stations being staffed by more. Local police stations were grouped together under the command of a uniformed sergeant, whose station was known as a "sergeant's station". Larger towns in the county constabulary areas had police stations staffed by a number of officers, often under the command of an inspector or superintendent, usually also commanding a sub-division or division respectively, and therefore giving the names of "sub-divisional station" or "divisional station" to their stations.

== Gallery ==
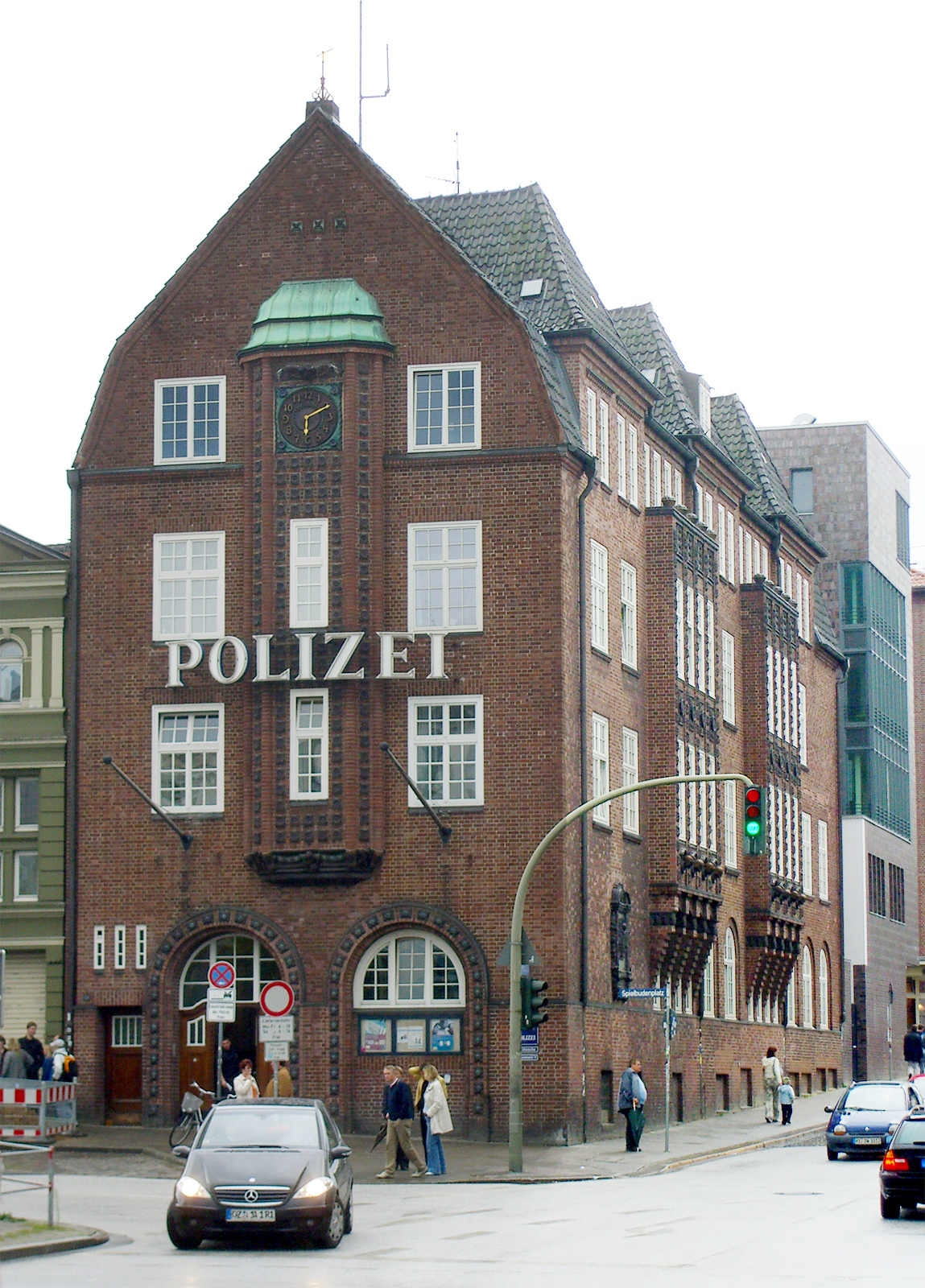
Davidwache, a well-known Hamburg Police station in Hamburg, Germany

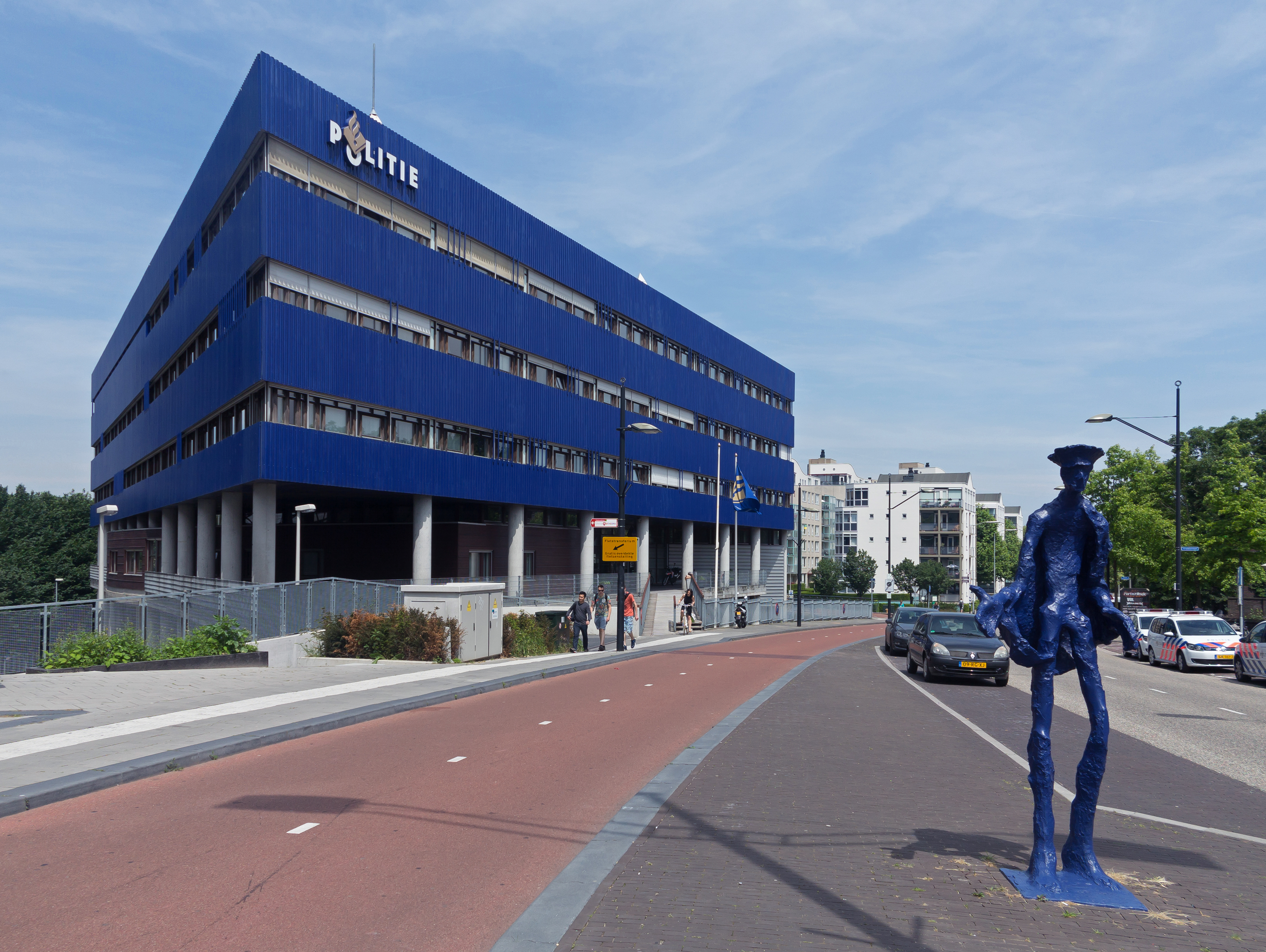
The National Police Corps's Oost-Nederland Regional Police Bureau main office in Nijmegen, Netherlands

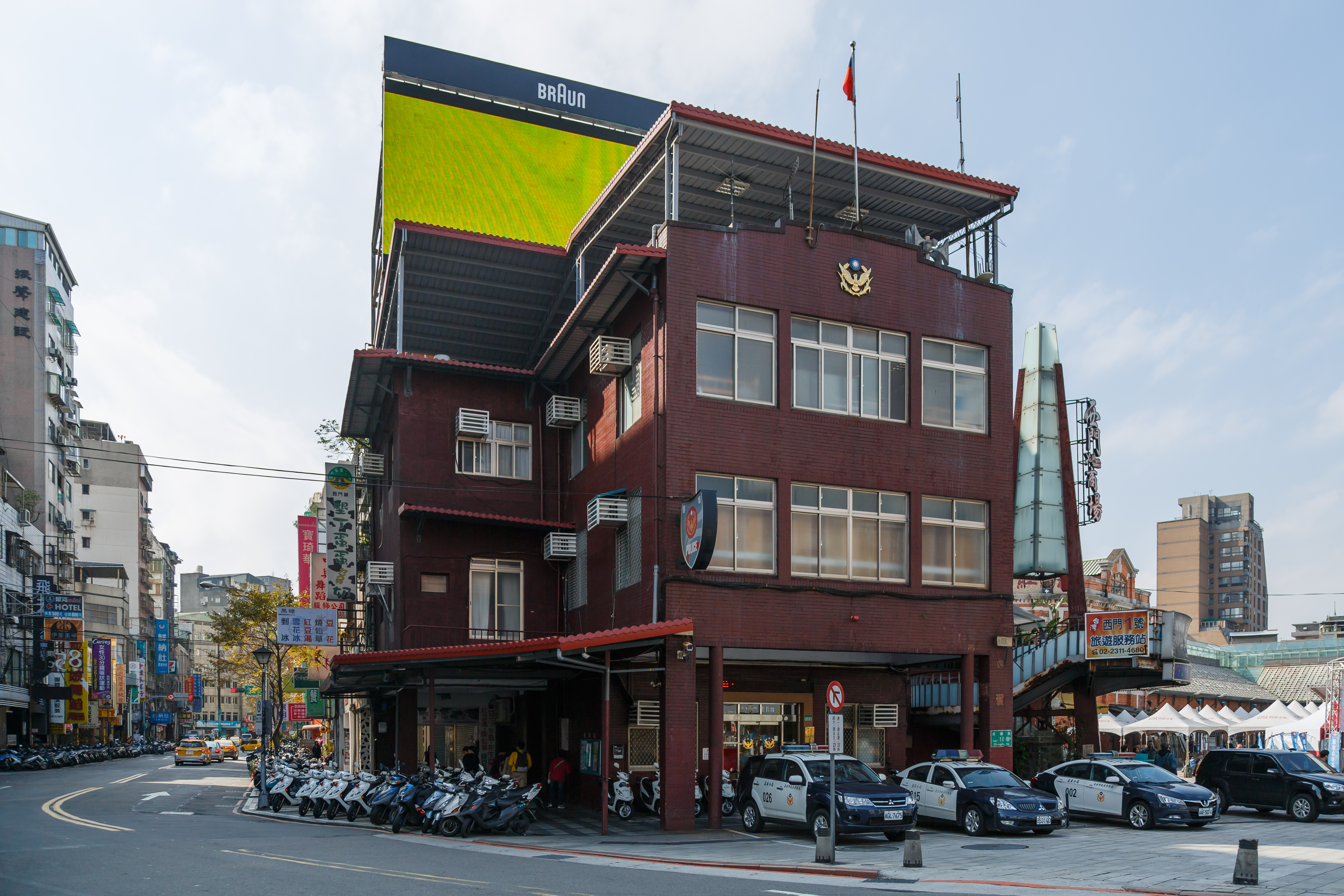
The Taipei City Police Department's Hanzhong Street Police Station in Taipei, Taiwan

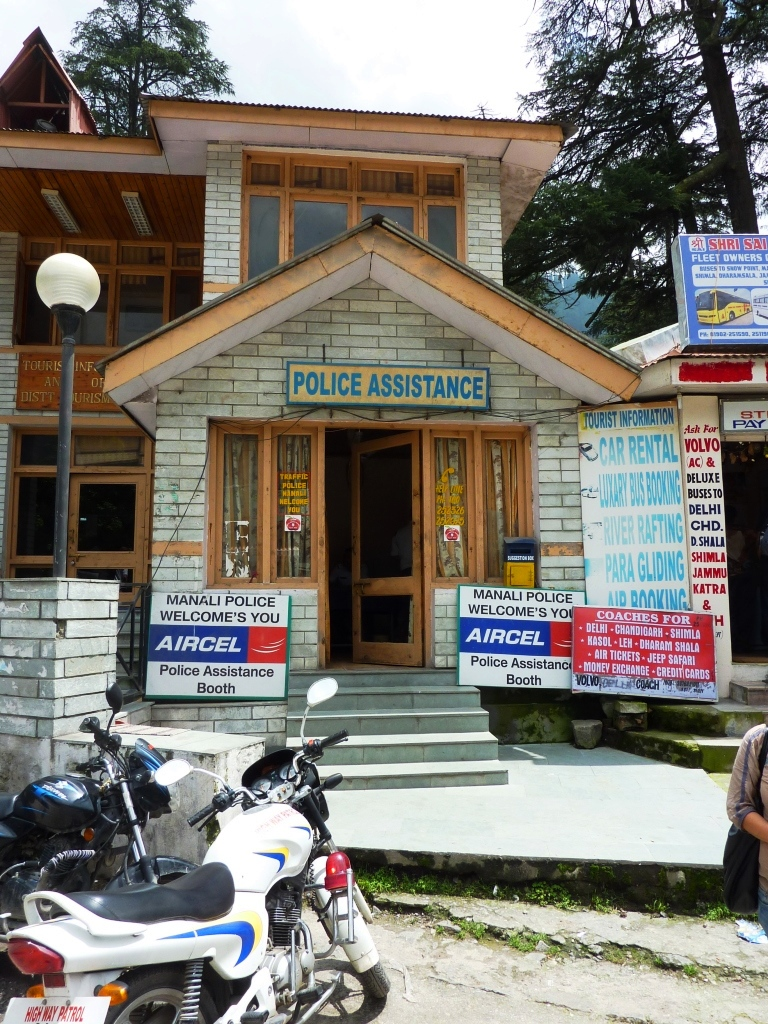
A Himachal Pradesh Police assistance booth in Manali, India

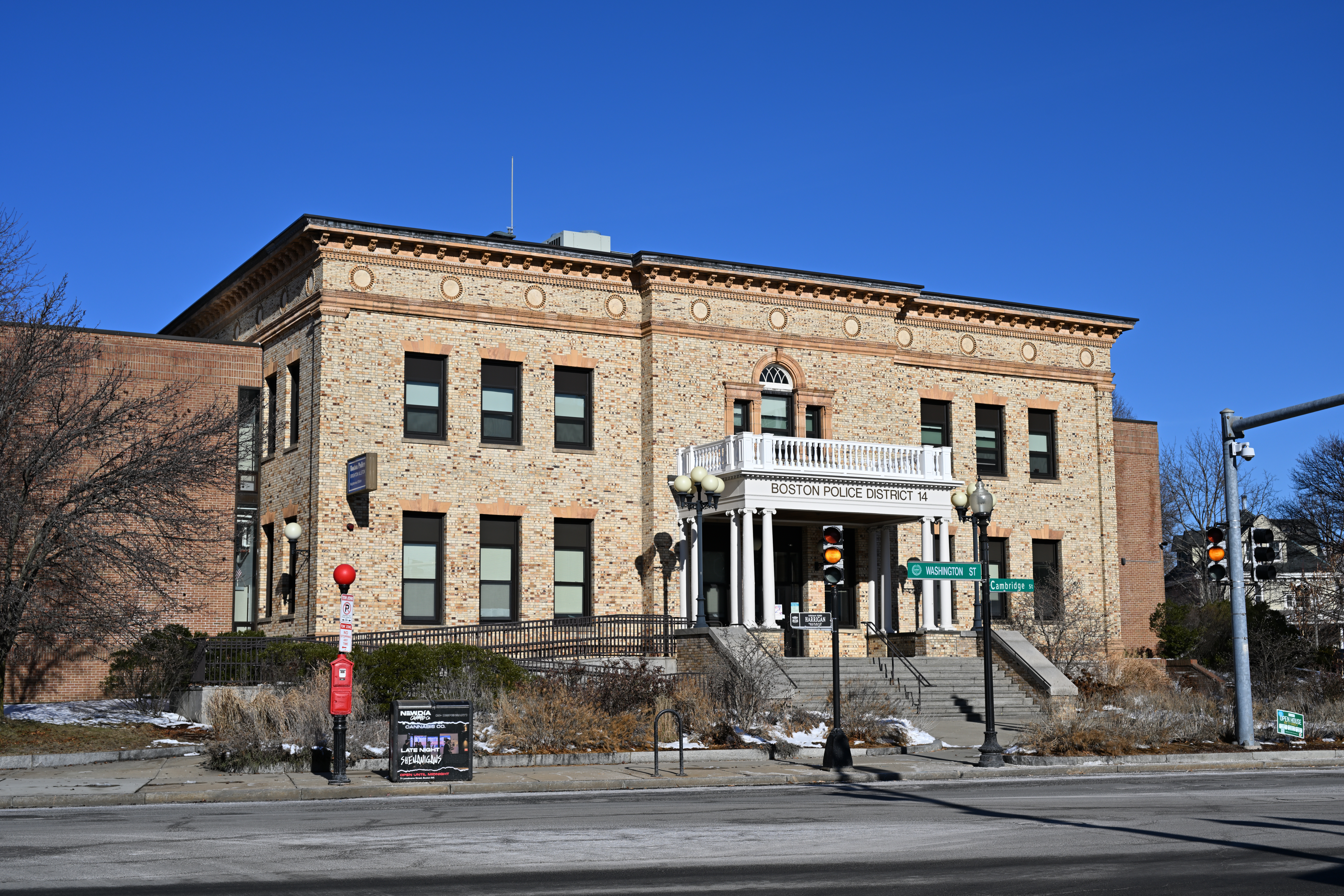
The Boston Police Department's District D-14 station in Boston, Massachusetts

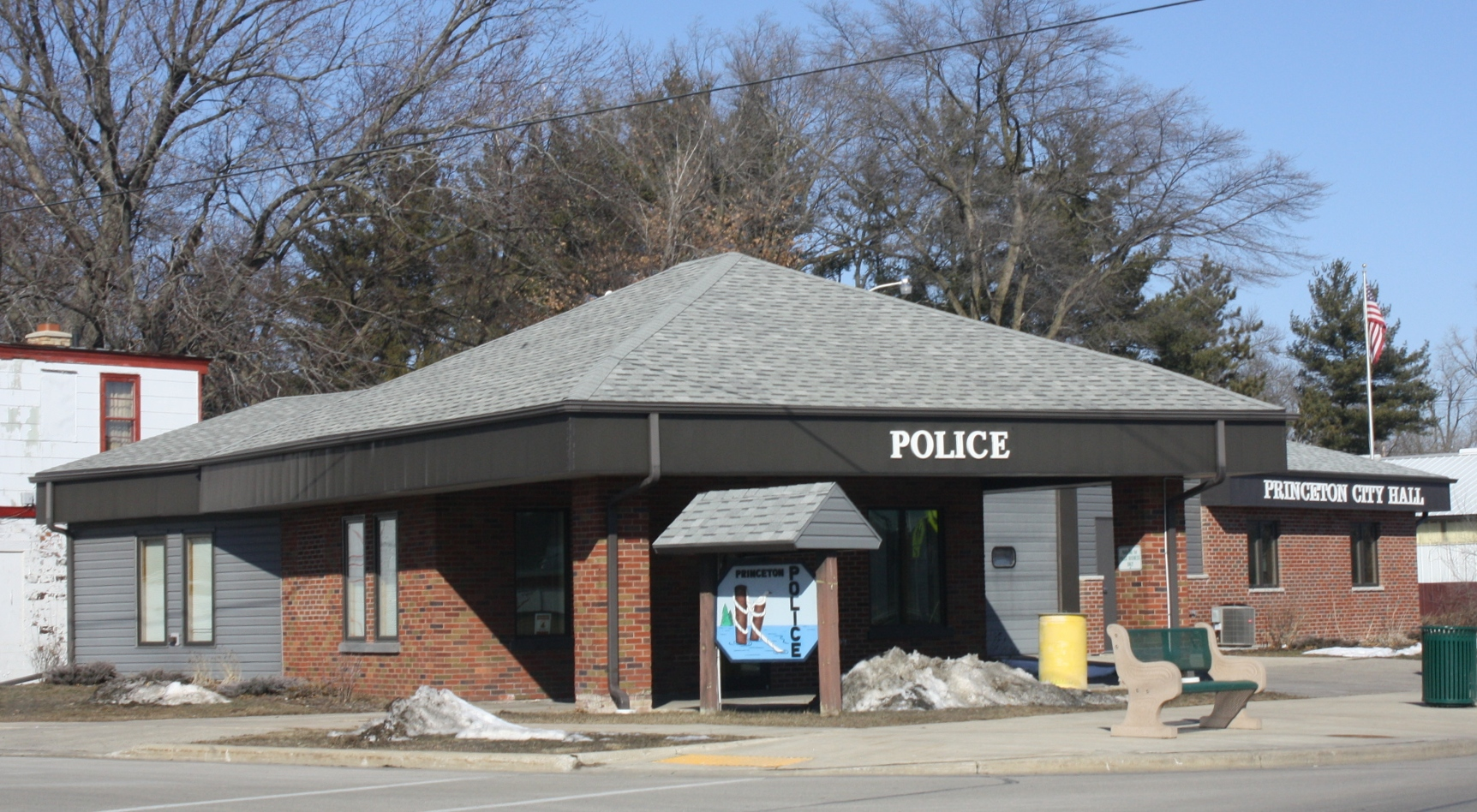
The combined police station and city hall in Princeton, Wisconsin

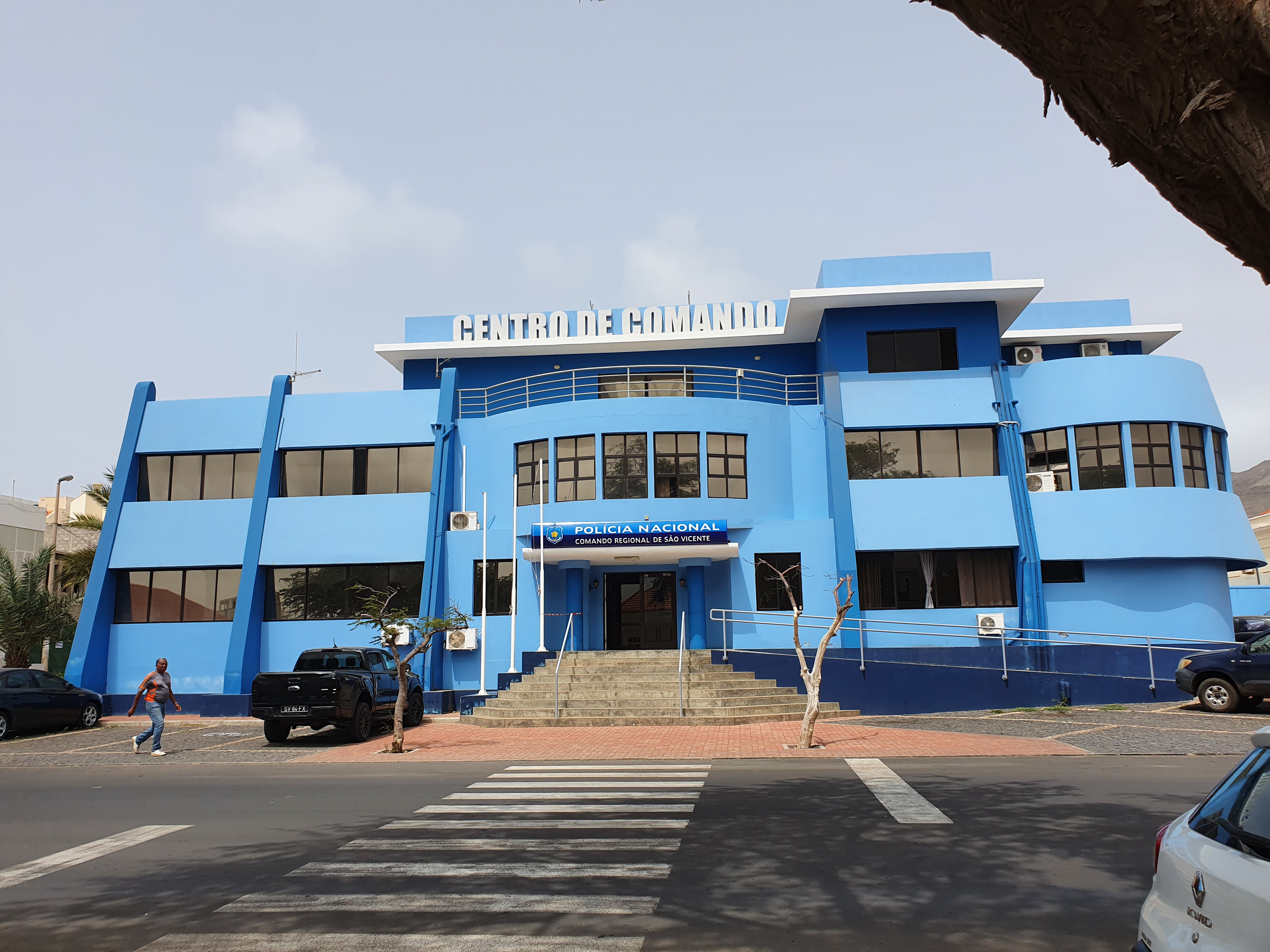
A Cape Verde National Police station in Mindelo, Cape Verde

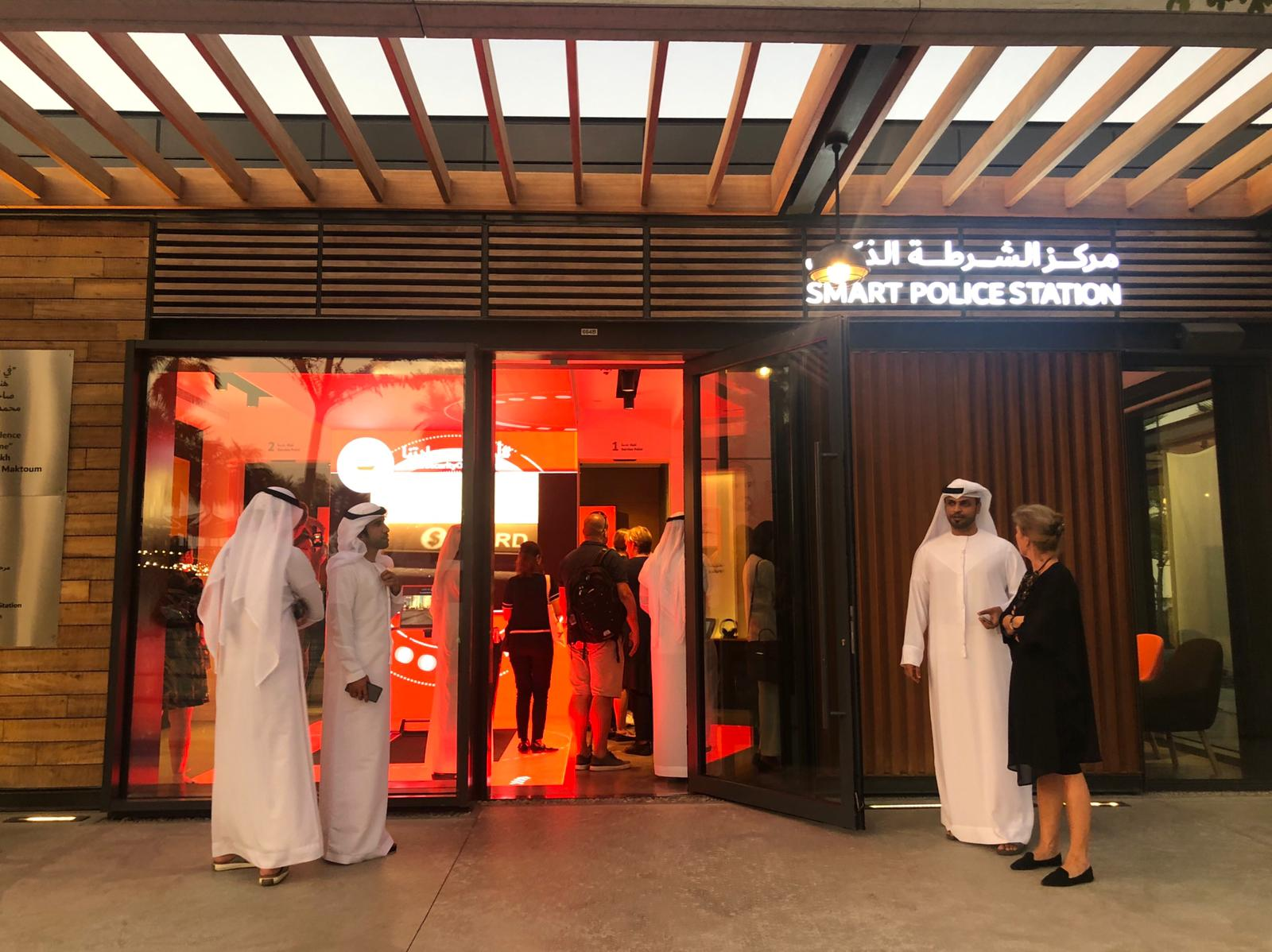
A Dubai Police Force Smart Police Station in Dubai, United Arab Emirates

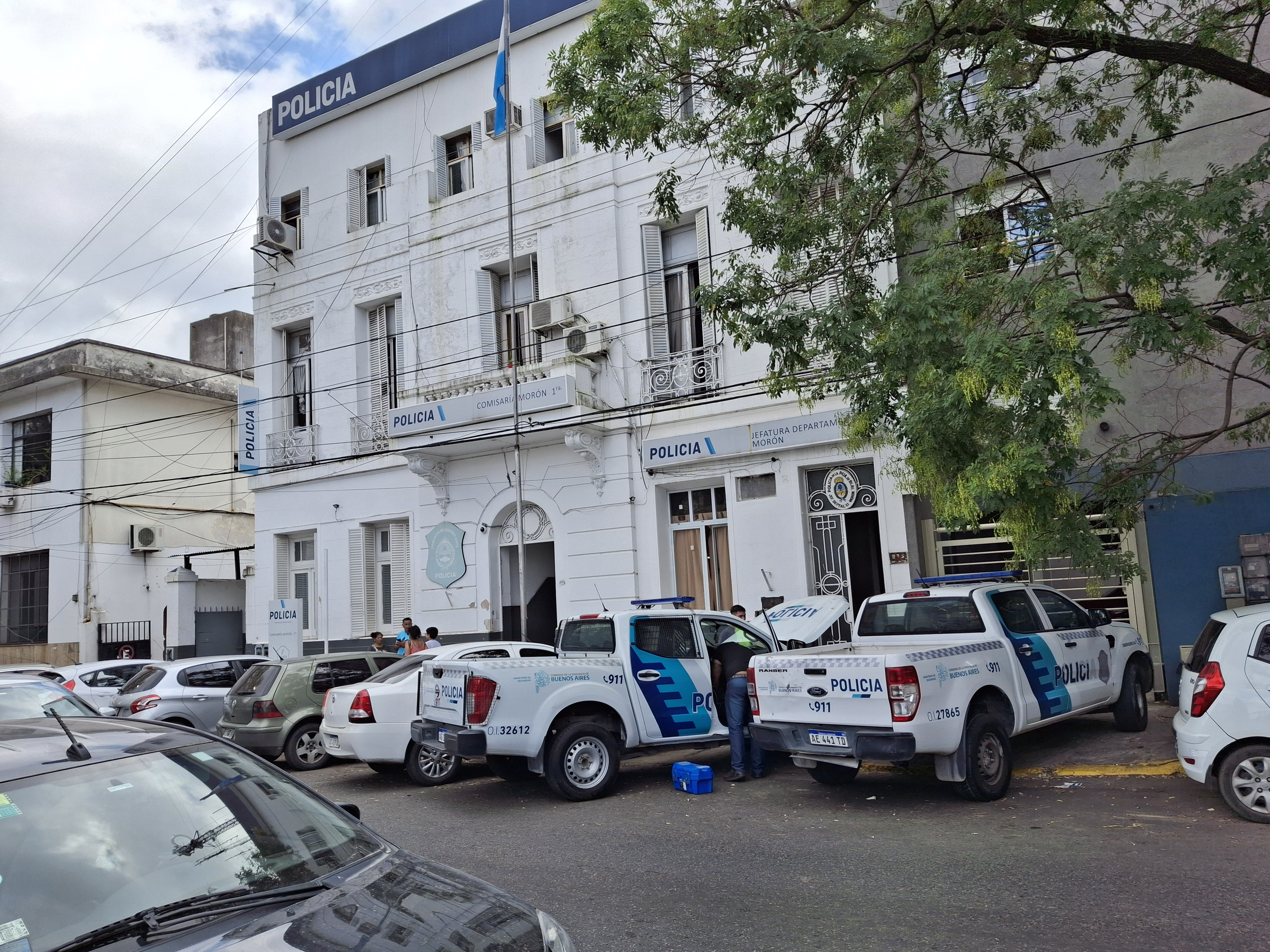
The Buenos Aires City Police's 1st Police Station in Buenos Aires, Argentina

== See also ==
- Fire station
- Police box
- List of police stations, about notable individual stations
