= Wood Street, London =

Street in the City of London

Coordinates: 51°30′58″N 0°05′39″W

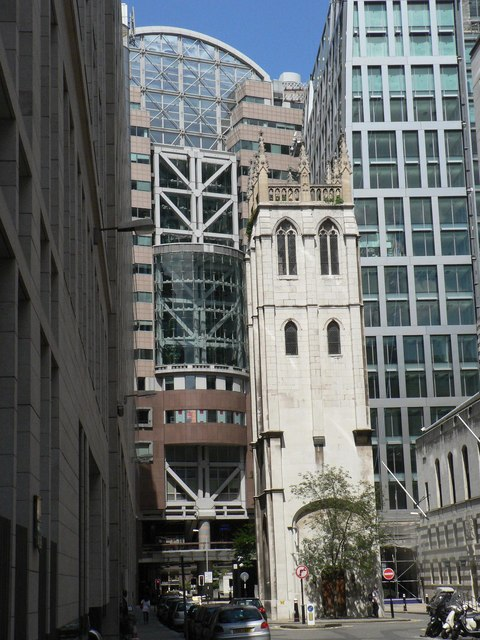
Tower of St Alban, Wood Street, seen from the south; the former City of London Police HQ is to the right.

Wood Street is a street in the City of London, the historic centre and primary financial district of London. It originates in the south at a junction with Cheapside; heading north it crosses Gresham Street and London Wall. The northernmost end runs alongside The Postern, part of the Barbican estate, stopping at Andrewes House. Today Wood Street lies within the wards of Bassishaw (north of Gresham Street) and Cheap (south of Gresham Street).

== History ==
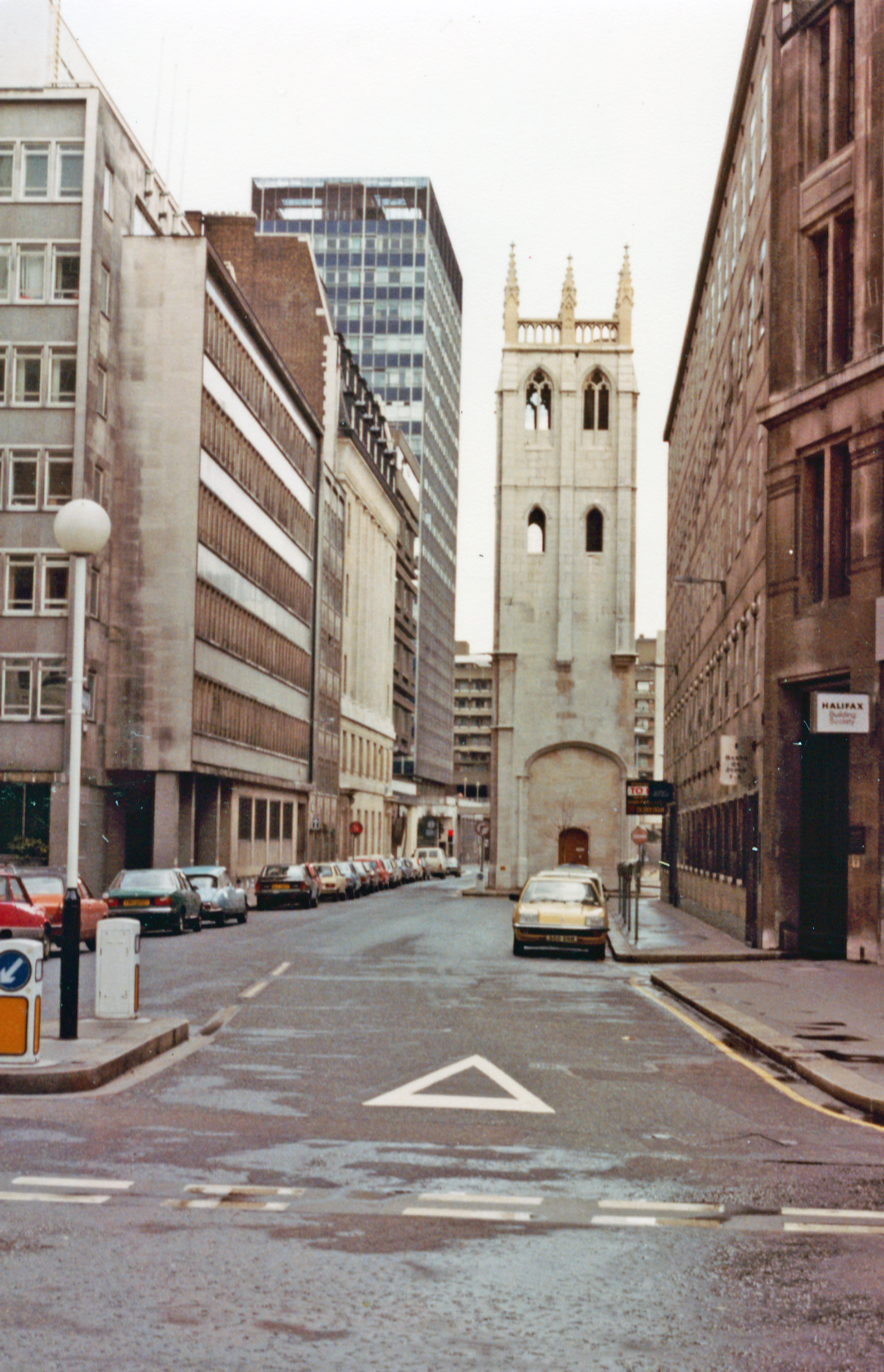
Wood Street in 1983 (from the south); the telephone exchange is on the left.

The street was originally the main north–south route through the Roman Fort, which was discovered after World War II bombing. The north gate of the fort became Cripplegate, the south gate of the fort was just south of the junction with Love Lane, and the road diverts slightly to the east suggesting that the gate was blocked up or in use, and they had to knock through the Roman fort wall to allow Wood Street to continue.

It has been suggested that this was an early road after the so-called Alfredian restoration of the City in around 886 AD. The road led from the main port at Queenhithe (Bread Street) to the main market street at Cheapside and then on north to Cripplegate and out of London to the north.

St Alban, Wood Street was a church in the street, dedicated to Saint Alban. The church was of medieval origin, rebuilt in 1634 and then destroyed in the Great Fire of London in 1666. It was then rebuilt in a Gothic design by Sir Christopher Wren. However, it was severely damaged by bombing during the Second World War and the ruins cleared, leaving only the tower still present.

St Michael Wood Street was a church and parish of medieval origin that was first mentioned in 1225 as St. Michael de Wudestrate. It stood on the west side of Wood Street, initially with a frontage on Huggin Lane but later on Wood Street itself.

Wood Street was the address of the country's largest telephone exchange: opened in 1929, it was bombed and rebuilt during the war, expanded in 1971 and then finally closed in 1990 (being demolished not long afterwards).

== Notable Buildings and Offices ==
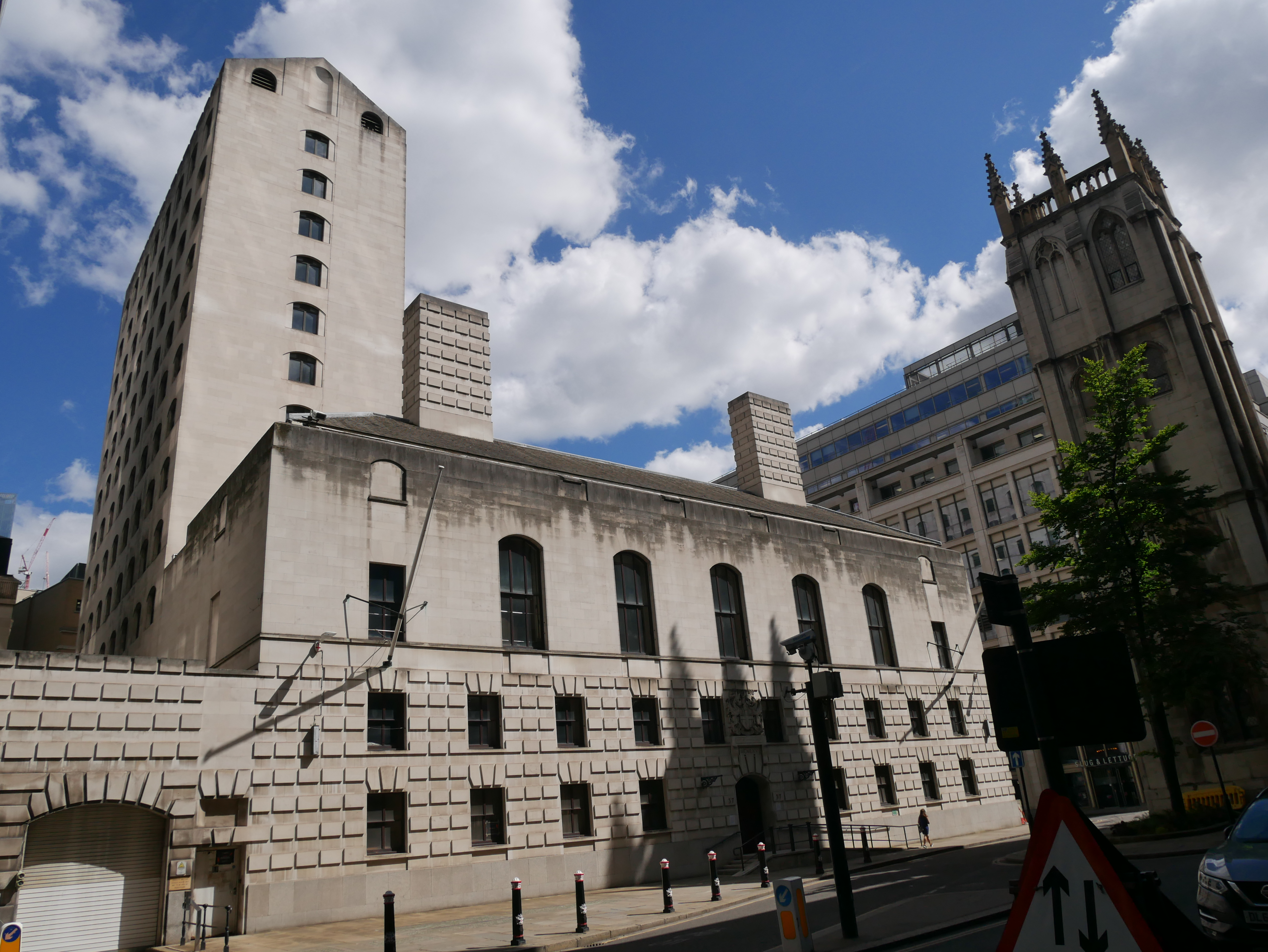
The former Police HQ is due to be converted into a luxury hotel.

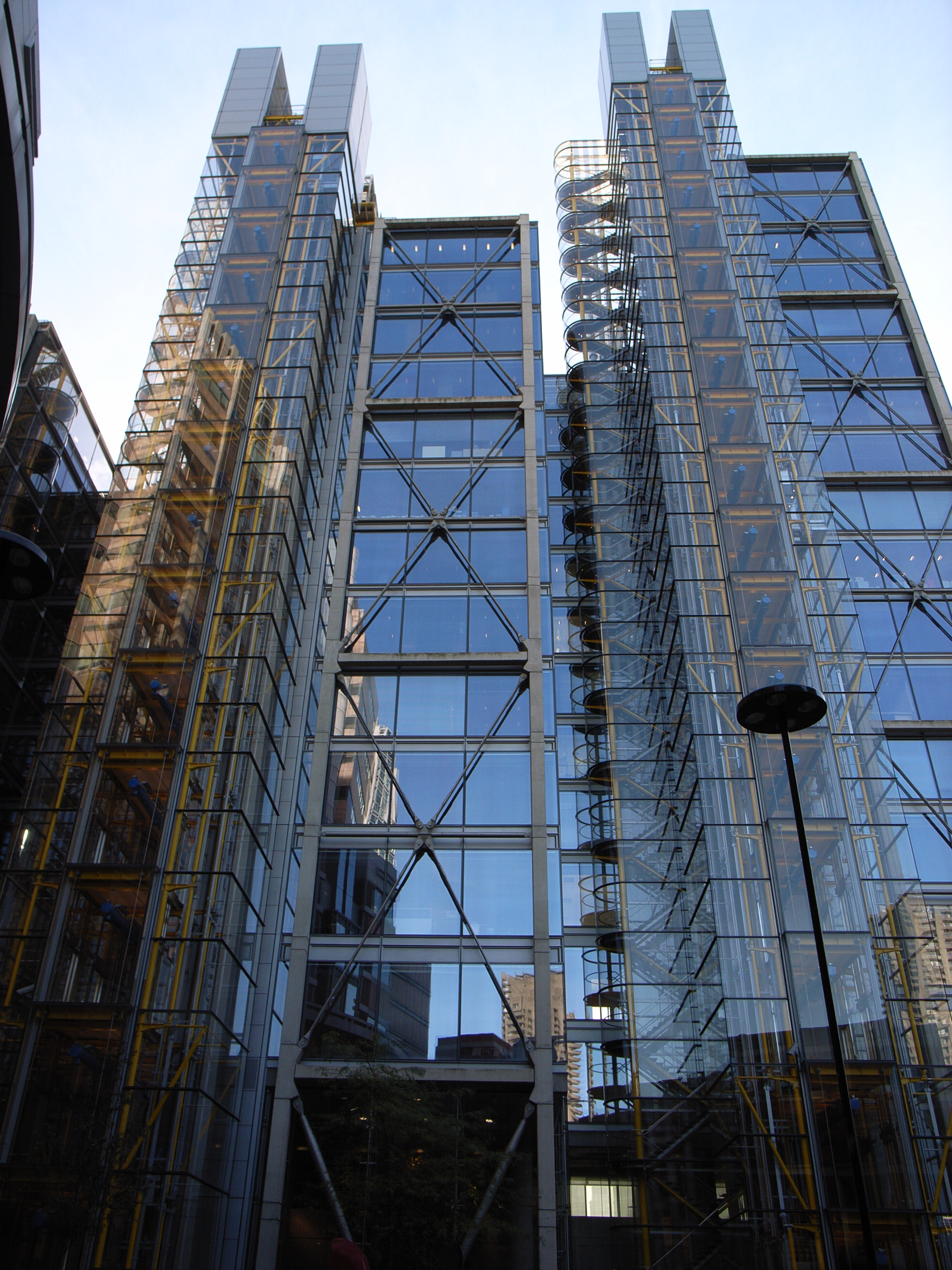
88 Wood Street, a commercial office

There is a tower on a traffic island in the middle of the street, which is all that remains of the church of St Alban, Wood Street.

Wood Street was formerly the location of the headquarters of the City of London Police, at its corner with Love Lane, before leaving the site in 2020; the collection of buildings, dating from 1963-66, is Grade II* listed.

Another notable building is 88 Wood Street, a commercial office completed in 1999 that was designed by Richard Rogers Partnership, now known as Rogers Stirk Harbour + Partners.

Other notable buildings include the hall of the Worshipful Company of Pewterers on nearby Oat Lane.

TradeWinds, the international shipping news service have an office on Wood Street.

== See also ==
- Aldermanbury
- Basinghall Street
- Wood Street Counter
