= Murrin =

Murrin is a surname. Notable people with the surname include:

- Kristina Murrin (fl. 2001), Australian government official
- Luke Murrin (fl. 1855–1885), American politician
- Thomas J. Murrin (1929–2012), US Deputy Secretary of Commerce
- Tom Murrin (1939–2012), American performance artist and playwright

== See also ==
- McMurrin
