= Lammas Green =

Housing estate in Lewisham, London, England

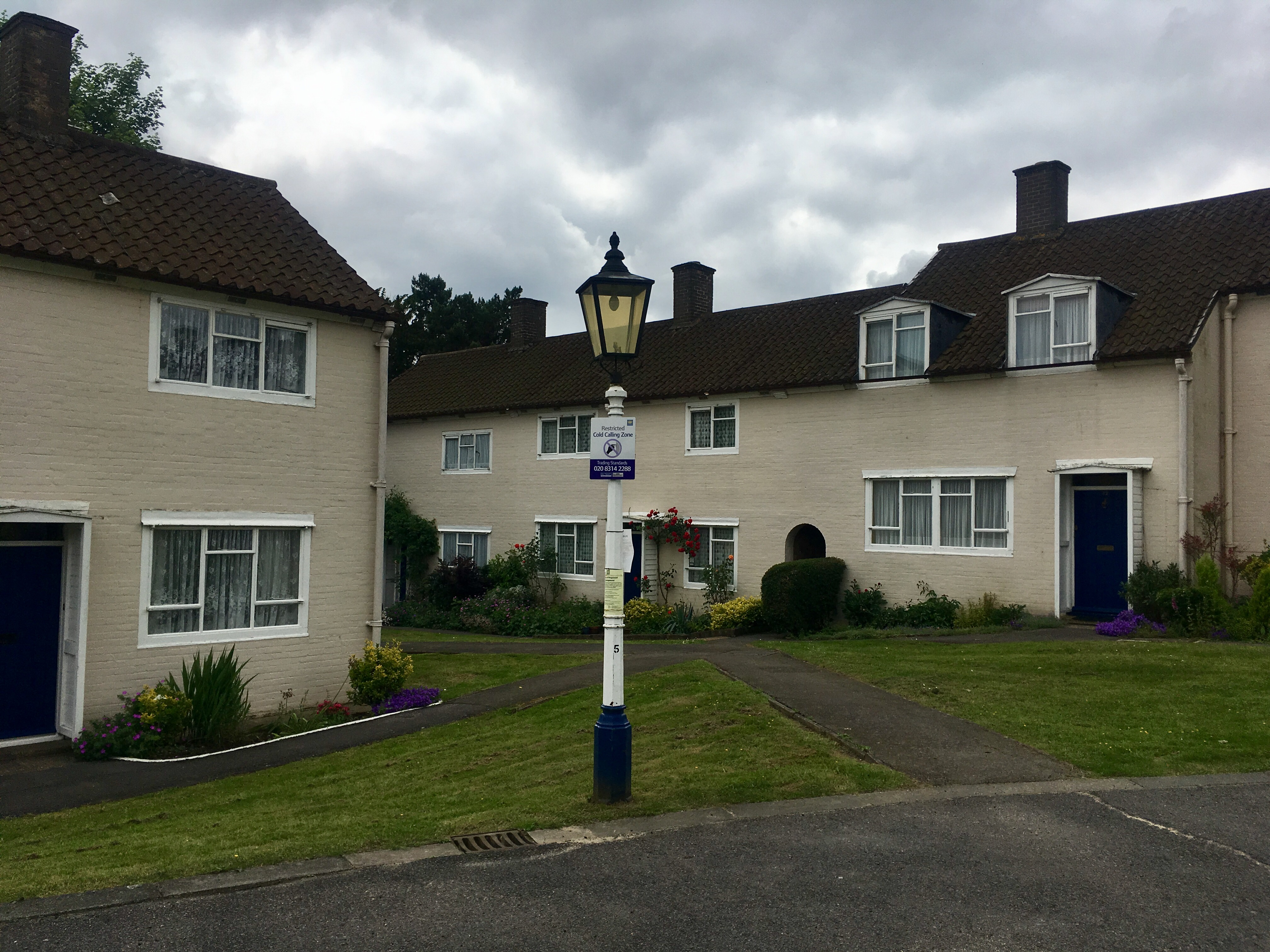
30-39 Lammas Green, Sydenham, June 2018

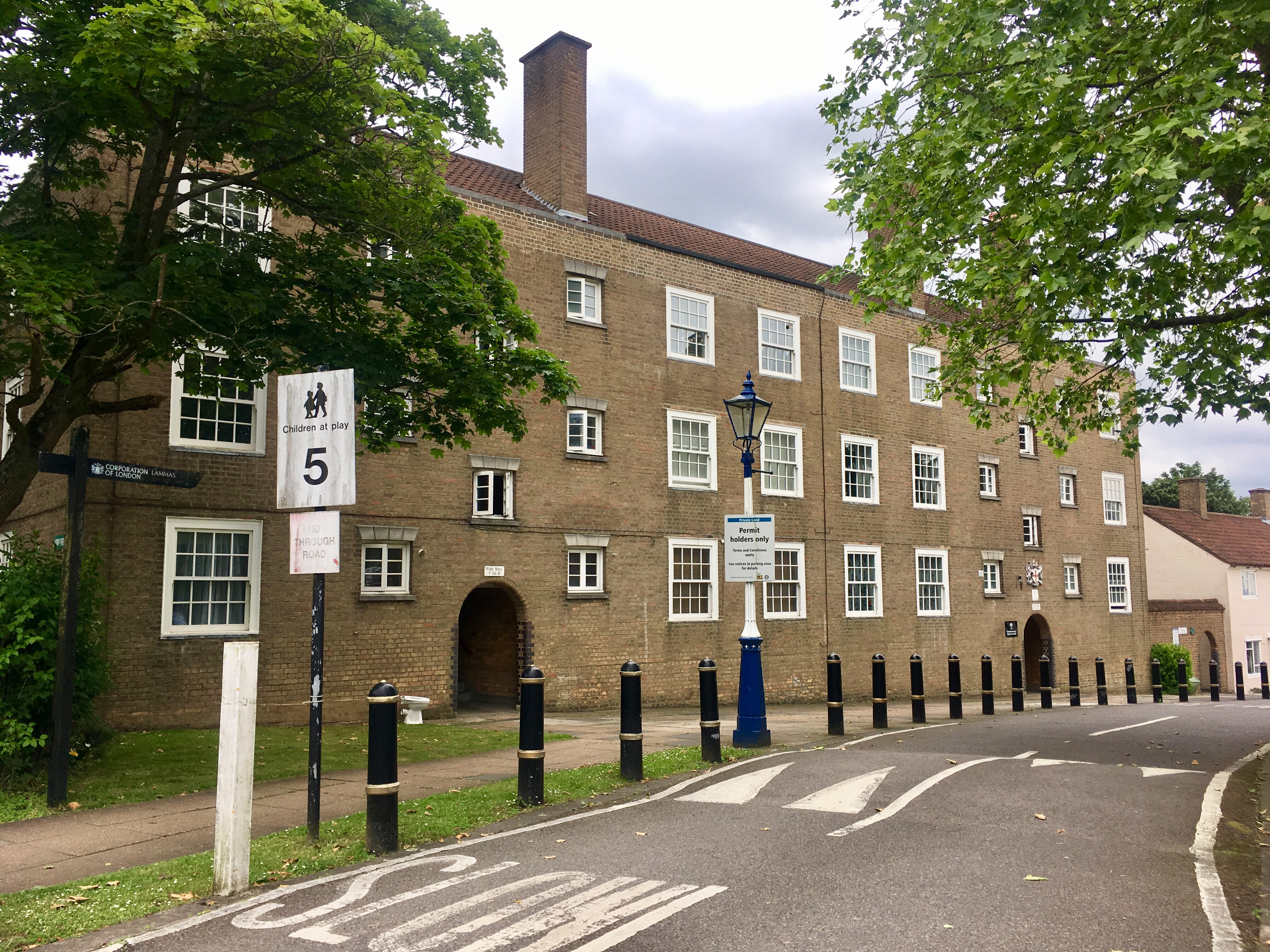
1-12 Lammas Green, Sydenham, June 2018 (7)

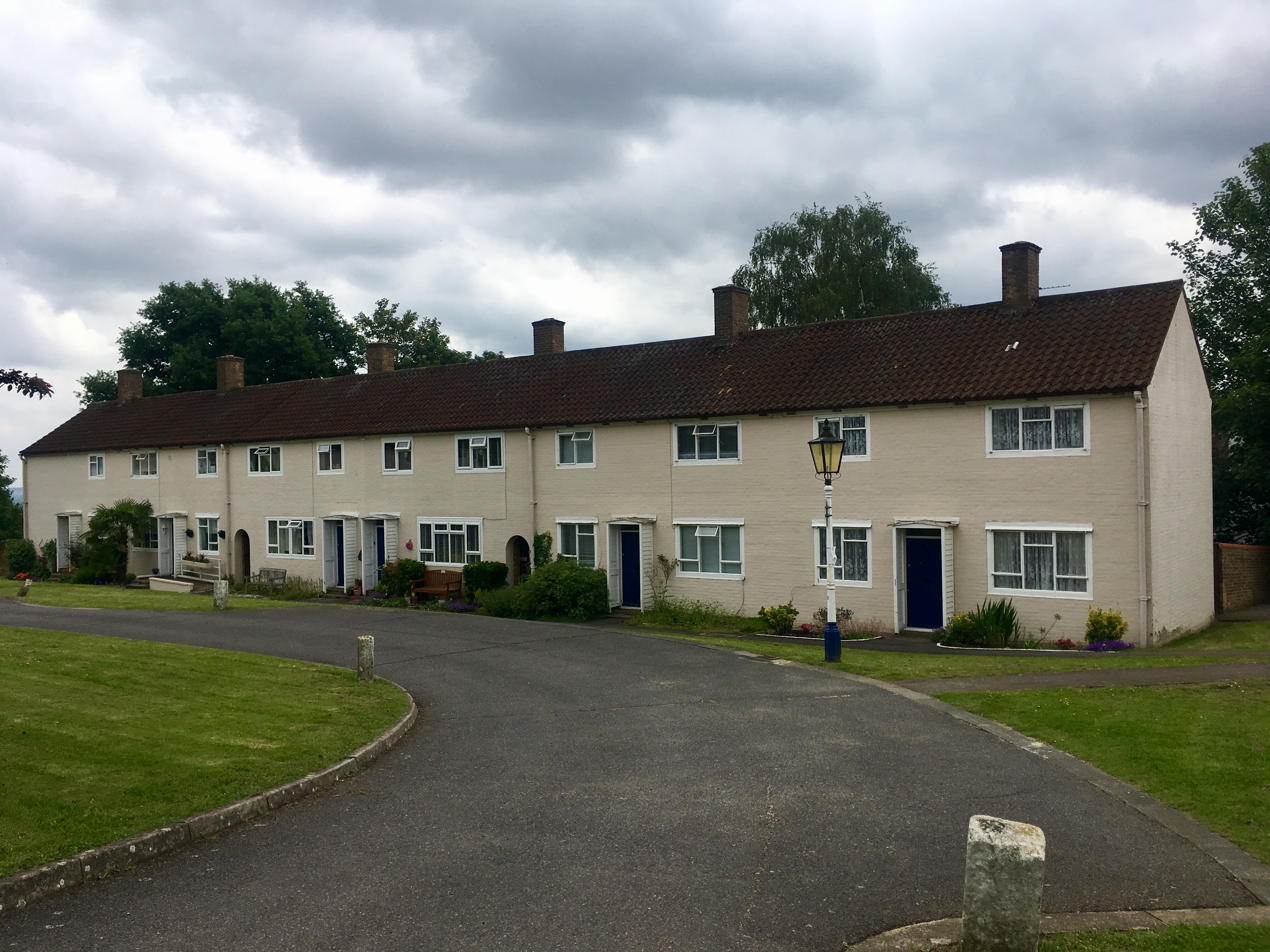
24-29 Lammas Green, Sydenham, June 2018

Lammas Green is a Grade II listed housing estate in Lewisham, South London.

Designed by notable architect Donald McMorran of Farquharson and McMorran., the estate comprises three rows of terraces, two blocks of flats and a community hall set around a village green. The estate was built between 1955 and 1957 for the Corporation of the City of London.

== Architectural style ==
The estate is built from traditional materials to create a village-like feel that, at the time, was considered unique for inner London.

According to a council statement in 2010, the City of London Corporation built Lammas Green as a 'conscious return to the Kent vernacular, with colour-washed walls, pantile roofs and stout brick chimneys - perhaps out of step with the prevailing trends in architecture'.

The estate reflected a traditionalist approach by maintaining older values of proportion and style but was unique in that these values were applied to a public estate. Typically, McMorran differed from similar traditionalist architects at the time for his willingness to tackle progressive projects of this type. Lammas Green is considered the finest example of the four public housing schemes McMorran built.

At 57 dwellings per acre, the estate's low density was intended 'so as to establish conditions under which a community with its own continuity and life might be able to flourish'.

== Influence ==
The partnership forged between McMorran and his client the City of London while building Lammas Green was thought to have been a successful one, so much so that it would have a profound effect on the City of London and the way they tackled similar large-scale social housing projects in the mid-twentieth century.
