= McMorran =

McMorran or MacMorran is a surname. Recorded as O'Morahan, O'Moran, McMorran, Moran, Morran, Morahan and others, it is possibly of Irish origin. Moran, Morin, and Morain are also recorded in France, Ireland and England.

Notable people with the surname include:

- Donald McMorran (1904–1965), English architect
- Eddie McMorran (1923–1984), Northern Ireland footballer
- Henry McMorran (1844–1929), American politician and businessman
- John MacMorran (died 1595), Scottish merchant and murder victim
- John McMorran (1934–2001), Scottish footballer

== Places ==
Places named after people called McMorran include:

- McMorran Place, entertainment complex in Port Huron, Michigan, United States
- The McMorran and Washburne Department Store Building, a commercial building in Eugene, Oregon, US
