= Devon County Hall =

County building in Exeter, Devon, England

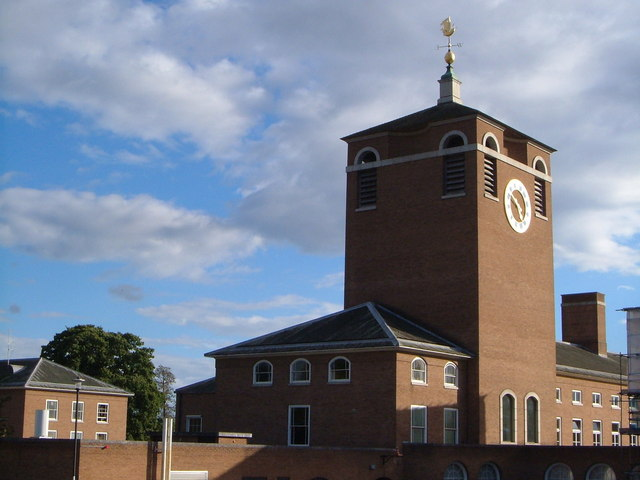

- Location within Devon
- 50.7146°N 3.5175°W
- Location: Exeter, Devon, England

History
- Built: 1964

Site notes
- Architect: Donald McMorran
- Architectural style: Neo-classical style

Listed Building – Grade II*
- Designated: 24 April 1998
- Reference no.: 1323701

Devon County Hall is a municipal building in Topsham Road, Exeter, Devon, England. The building, which is the headquarters of Devon County Council, is a Grade II* listed building.

== History ==
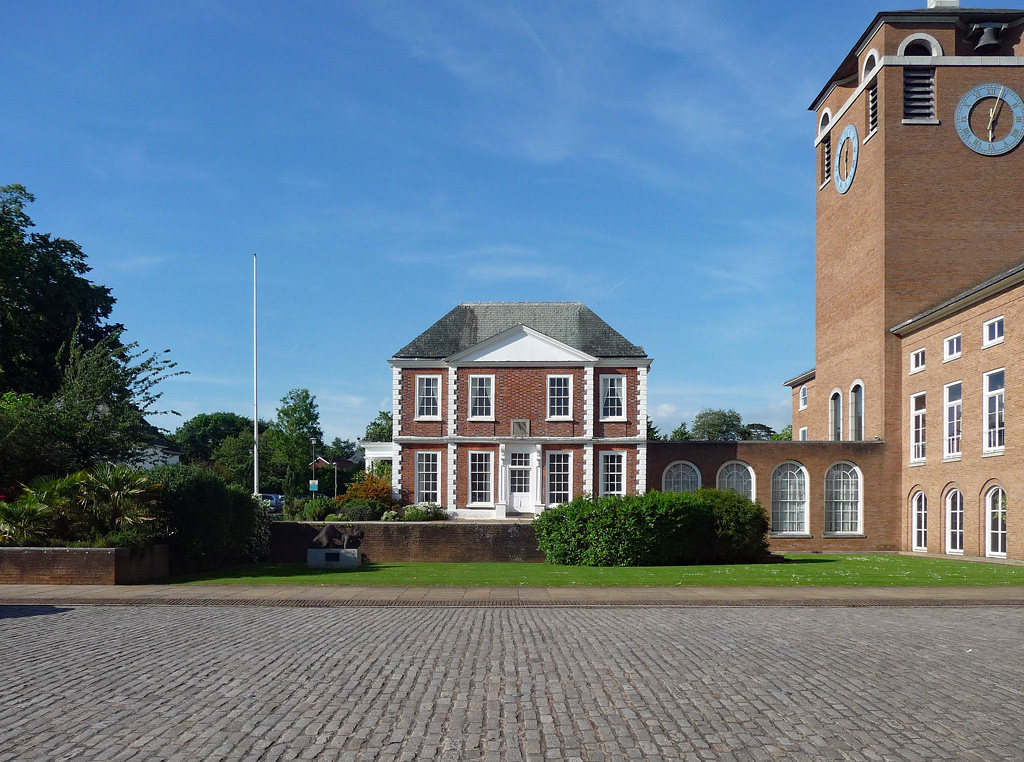
Belair House, now part of Devon County Hall

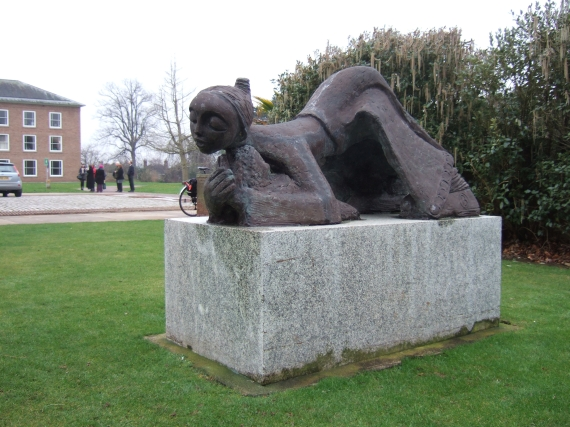
Sculpture of a female figure by Barbara Pearson entitled "Loving Care"

Following the implementation of the Local Government Act 1888, which established county councils in every county, it became necessary to find a meeting place for Devon County Council. The administration of justice had been conducted from Rougemont Castle and county leaders decided that the administration of the county should also be conducted from new offices established within the castle in 1895 and that meetings of the county council should be held in a courtroom there. This arrangement continued until the mid 20th century when county leaders decided that they needed dedicated facilities. A site was selected in the grounds of Bellair House, a Queen Anne style mansion built in red brick and stone around 1700 for the merchant John Vowler and later occupied by Dame Georgiana Buller, and an adjoining early Victorian house, known as Coaver.

The foundation stone for the new building was laid on 16 October 1958. It was designed by Donald McMorran in the neo-classical style and was officially opened on 14 July 1964. The design involved a three-storey main frontage facing a large expanse of parkland with Bellair House forming the left hand wing and a new block forming the right hand wing; the central section of the main frontage featured three segmental archways leading to an inner courtyard. Internally, the principal room was the council chamber, which was located on the north east side of the inner courtyard; a substantial clock tower was erected above it. The Victorian house, Coaver, was also converted into the complex, as a social club for council staff.

An annexe to the east of the main building, to meet the ever increasing accommodation needs of the county council, was completed in 1984. A sculpture of a female figure by Barbara Pearson entitled "Loving Care" was erected outside Bellair House to commemorate the centenary of Devon County Council in 1988.

Queen Elizabeth II, accompanied by the Duke of Edinburgh, attended a reception in the building, as part of a tour of the county to celebrate her Golden Jubilee, on 1 May 2002.

Works of art inside the building include watercolour paintings by Hugh Gurney depicting Odam Bridge and the River Mole near Meethe in Devon.
