= Wood Street Police Station =

Police station in London, England

Coordinates: 51°31′0″N 0°5′37″W

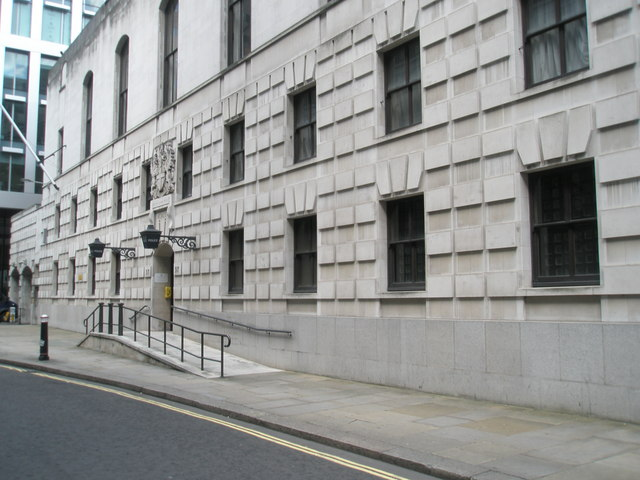
View of west elevation

Wood Street Police Station is a former City of London Police facility in Wood Street, London, United Kingdom. It was designed by Donald McMorran and George Whitby in the neo-classical style and built between 1963 and 1966. The main building is a three-storey quadrangle housing the police station, with a thirteen-storey tower attached that formerly contained residential accommodation, offices and social spaces. The station was the headquarters of the police force between 2001 and its closure in 2021. A leasehold on the building was sold to the Magnificent Hotels group in 2020 and plans are approved for its conversion into a five-star hotel.

== Description ==
The building was designed by Donald McMorran (for whom it is his best known work) and George Whitby for the City of London Police and constructed between 1963 and 1966. The police station is sited on a plot facing Wood Street and north of Love Lane. The four-storey (including basement) police station portion is quadrangular in shape and fronts onto Wood Street; the attached office and residential block is thirteen storeys and attached at the north-east corner of the building.

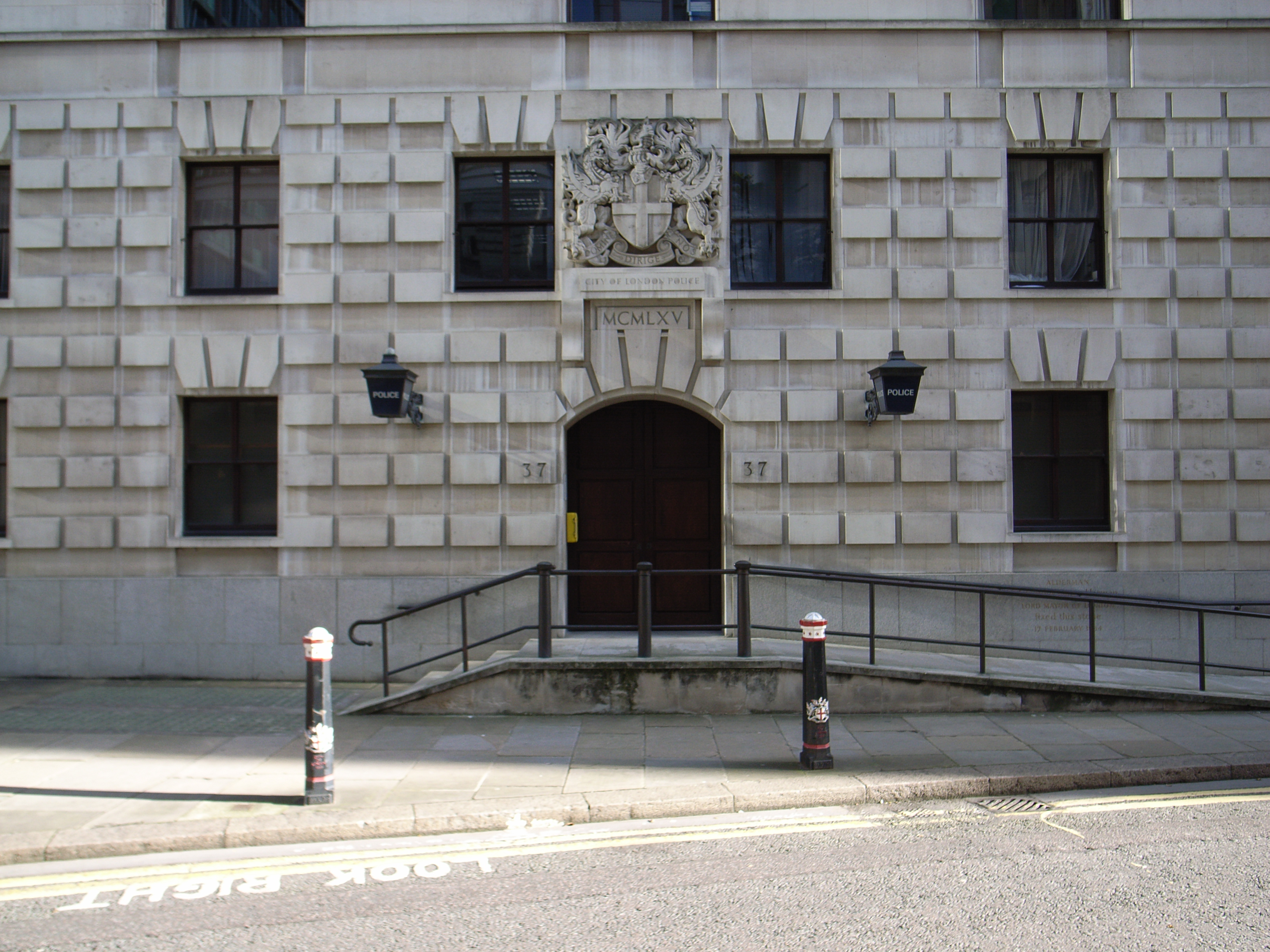
Detail of entrance

The police station is a reinforced concrete-framed structure, with a Portland stone and brick cladding; its roof is slate. The building has features of the classical Doric order; a granite skirting runs around the perimeter of the ground floor. The ground and first floor stone cladding is rusticated in style while the second floor was more formal and plain. The prominent chimney stacks disguise the ventilation systems.

The arched entrance is from Wood Street on the west façade, it is flanked by one blue police lamp and four sash windows on either side. This elevation has ten sash windows at first floor level and seven at the second floor. Above the entrance is a stone representation of the Coat of arms of the City of London. The rear (east) elevation of the police station adjoins the St Mary Aldermanbury gardens; it has six bays, with the upper storeys in exposed concrete.

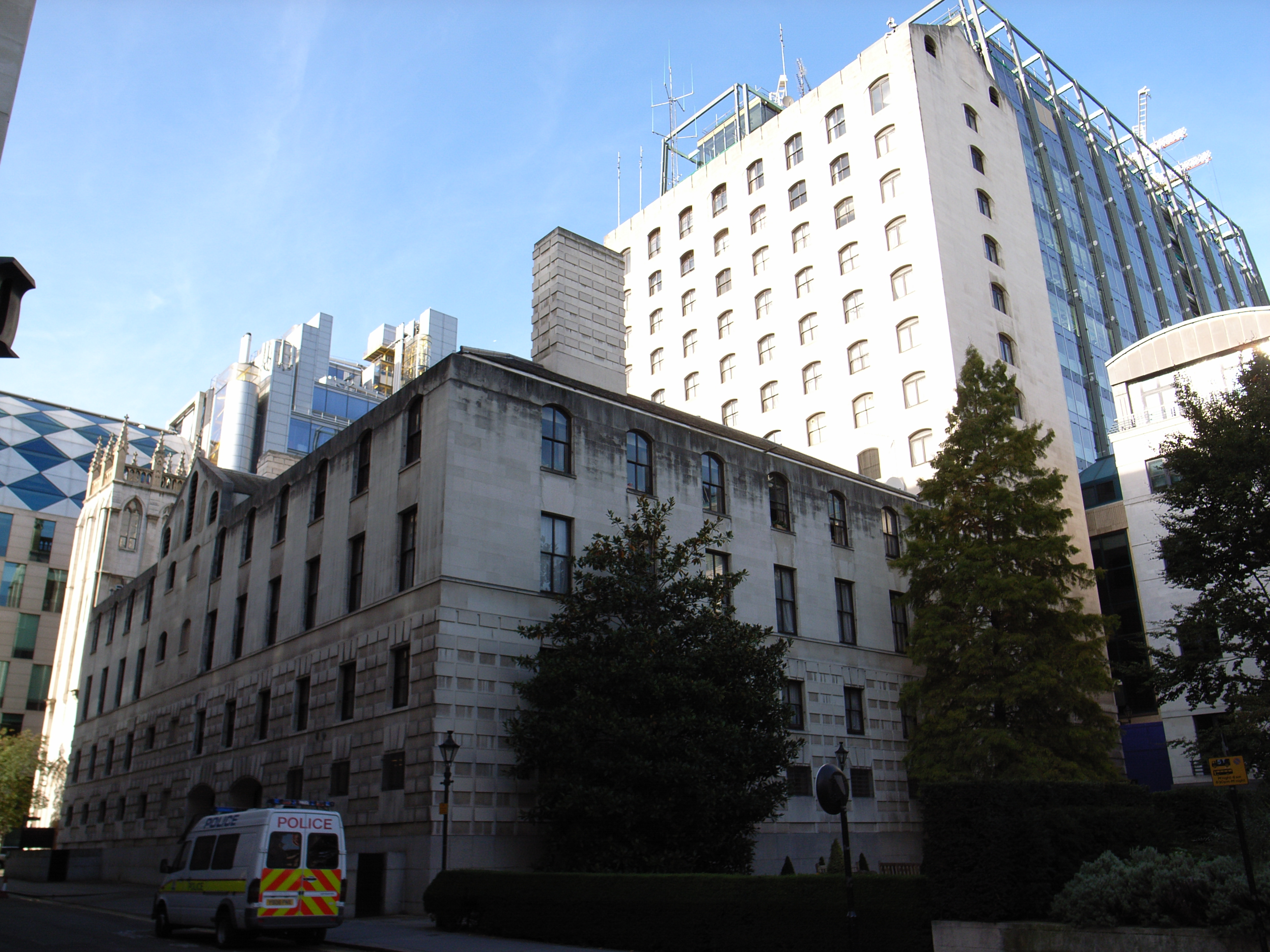
View from south-east, including tower

The tower block houses offices, flats and social areas and has connections through to the main building, including at a recreational area in the shared basement. The residential portions contain single bedrooms with a sink off a hallway with a shared bathroom. The principal elevations (north and south) are of eight bays, each with a segmental arched window. The roof is pitched with round-arched ventilation openings at both gable ends.

== Police use ==
The City of London Police maintained stables at the station for their mounted branch and used the second floor as offices for special constables. Wood Street was also the site of the City of London Police Museum and its basement squash courts could be converted into an emergency control centre. From 2001, following the closure of the establishment in Old Jewry, Wood Street was the headquarters of the City of London Police.

The building was featured in a 1996 episode of the BBC's Building Sights architecture documentary series, presented by cartoonist Posy Simmonds. She described it as a "neoclassical Italian palazzo" whose upper storey was reminiscent of the piano nobile. Simmonds noted that the building had been criticised at the time of its construction for choosing the classical style over the modernist style that was then in vogue. Wood Street police station was granted statutory protection as a listed building on 24 April 1998, it is currently graded as II*. As of 2017 it was Britain's only post-war police station to be listed.

In 2017 the City of London Police proposed to expand the station with an extension extending the full height of the tower. Listed building consent was granted for the proposal but works did not progress.

== Proposed redevelopment ==
Instead of expanding Wood Street the City of London Police chose to progress with a new Justice Quarter development in Salisbury Square, off Fleet Street. As well as a new police headquarters the site will include 18 court rooms for use by Crown, magistrates, county and civil courts. As part of the plans Wood Street was to close and in January 2020 the City of London sold a 151-year leasehold on the property to the Magnificent Hotels group for £40 million; they are planning to convert it into a five-star hotel. The City of London Police remained in the building until June 2021, with their headquarters then being relocated to the Guildhall.

Planning permission for the conversion of the building into a 216-bed hotel was granted in October 2021. The plans included conversion of the former police cells into whisky-tasting rooms and the horse stalls in the stables to dining rooms. The assembly hall was to become a ball room and the courtyard service yard would be covered over, with the former police car turntable becoming a bar. The Twentieth Century Society was supportive of the plans for what it described as a "sympathetic conservation-led refurbishment scheme". The plans included a two-storey extension. A revised set of plans was approved in April 2022, these removed the proposed two-storey extension but incorporated additional hotel rooms (bringing the building up to 235 beds), new bar and restaurant layouts.
