= McMurrin =

McMurrin is a surname. Notable people with the surname include:

- Joseph W. McMurrin (1858–1932), general authority and a member of the First Council of the Seventy of The Church of Jesus Christ of Latter-day Saints
- Roger McMurrin (1939–2023), American conductor and pastor
- Sterling M. McMurrin (1914–1966), American Mormon theologian and philosophy professor

== See also ==
- Murrin
