= Hammersmith Police Station =

Police station in Hammersmith, London

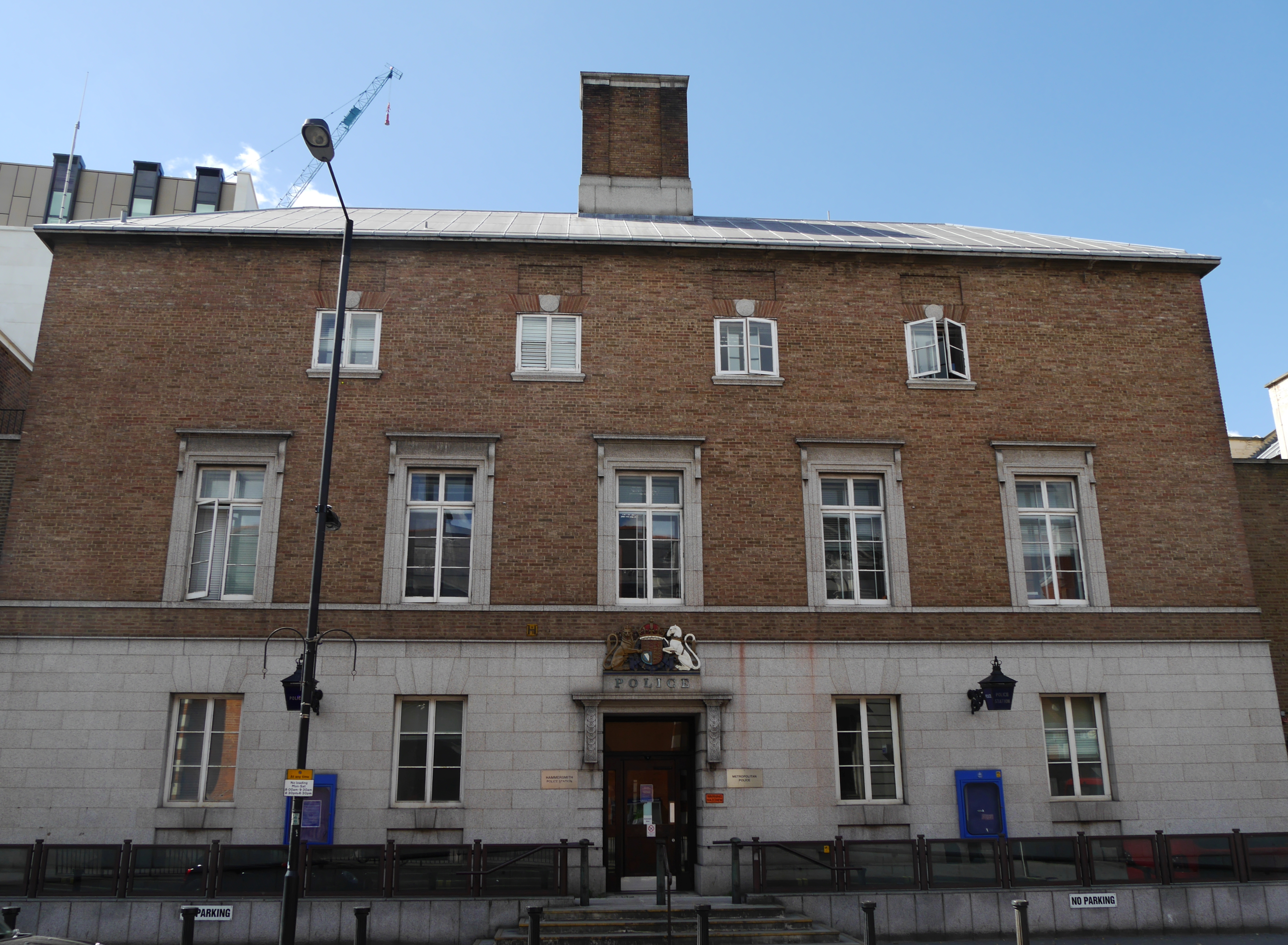
- Interactive map of the Hammersmith Police Station area

General information
- Location: Hammersmith, London, England
- Coordinates: 51.4947°N 0.2244°W
- Opened: 1939
- Owner: Metropolitan Police

Hammersmith Police Station is a Grade II listed police station in Hammersmith in the London Borough of Hammersmith and Fulham.

== History ==
It was built in 1939 to the designs of Donald McMorran, of Farquharson and McMorran.

The station closed in late 2016 for redevelopment to create an expanded facility, including improved horse stables, new custody cells and underground parking. It reopened in October 2020.
