= Donald McMorran =

Donald McMorran RA FSA FRIBA
- Portrait photo of Donald McMorran c.1945
- Born: 3 May 1904; Wallasey, Cheshire, England
- Died: 6 August 1965 (aged 61); Dorking, Surrey, England
- Occupation: Architect
- Practice: Farquharson McMorran; McMorran & Whitby
- Buildings: Halls of residence, University of Nottingham; Devon County Hall, Exeter; Wood Street police station, London; Lammas Green, estate, Sydenham Hill, London; Suffolk Record Office, Bury St Edmunds

Donald Hanks McMorran RA FRIBA FSA (3 May 1904 – 6 August 1965) was an English architect who is known today for his sensitive continuation of the neo-Georgian and classical tradition in the period after the Second World War. His buildings include halls of residence at the University of Nottingham, Wood Street Police Station in the City of London, public housing schemes around London, the South Block extension to the Old Bailey and civic buildings in Exeter and Bury St Edmunds.

== Early life and education ==
Donald Hanks McMorran was born in 1904 in Wallasey, Cheshire. His parents, William Edwin McMorran and Edith McMorran (née Hanks) originally came from north London. The family moved back to London and Donald was educated at Harrow County Grammar School. He studied under H. Farquharson in 1921.

== Career ==
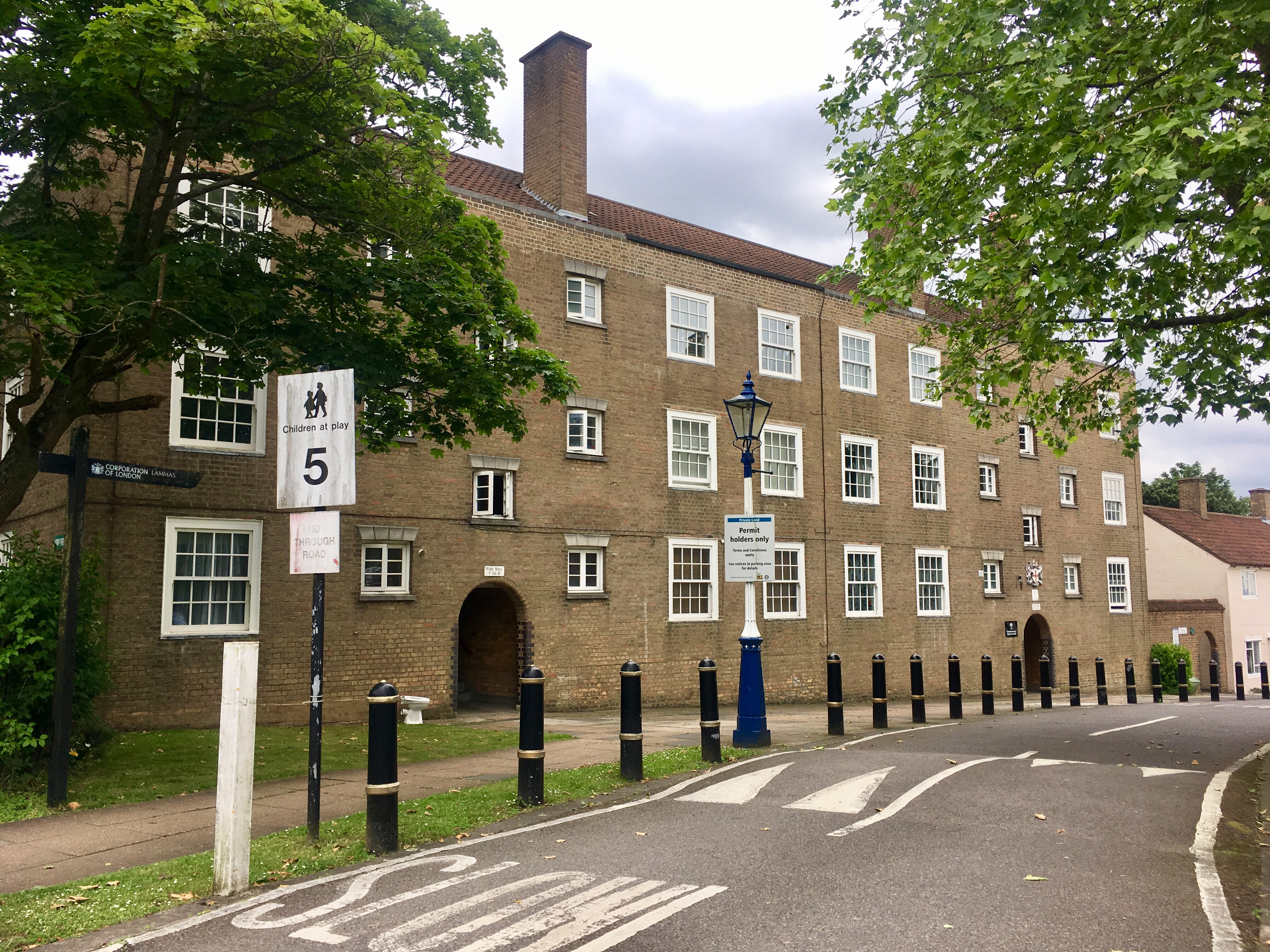
1-12 Lammas Green in Sydenham, London

In 1925 McMorran was admitted to the Royal Institute of British Architects as the RIBA Pugin Student. From 1927 to 1935, McMorran worked as assistant to the architect Vincent Harris.

After 1935, McMorran went into private practice. Initially he set up with Horace Farquharson as Farquharson McMorran. Subsequently, McMorran went into partnership with fellow architect George Whitby. After World War II, the architectural firm McMorran & Whitby were responsible for some buildings of distinction which were influenced by the work of Harris and Sir Edwin Lutyens. Among their noted works are Devon County Hall in Exeter (1957-64); the extension to the Shire Hall in Bury St Edmunds (1968); Cripps Hall, Lenton Hall and the social sciences block at the University of Nottingham; Wood Street Police Station in the City of London; and the South Block extension to the Old Bailey.

In the early 1960s, McMorran & Whitby were commissioned to design a new library headquarters as part of a wider civic buildings estate on Raingate Street in Bury St Edmunds, Suffolk. Due to the historic setting and proximity to the ancient Bury St Edmunds Abbey, a more conservative historicist design was specified. The New Classical-style Suffolk Record Office is today a Grade II listed building and is noted for its central lantern and original interior fittings.

McMorran was the architect of a number of housing estates around London, including the Lammas Green housing estate at Sydenham Hill, London (1957, now Grade II listed); estates in Hampstead, Poplar, Sydenham and Richmond upon Thames. His work on the Holloway Estate on Parkhurst Road Estate in Islington, London (1950s) is especially noted, and one of the apartment blocks there, McMorran House, bears his name.

McMorran was elected as an associate member of the Royal Academy of Art in 1955, before being elected as a full member in 1962.

McMorran was a Master of the Art Workers Guild in 1956. His work is characterised by carefully chosen materials, well-detailed and handsomely proportioned facades with minimal classical detail, showing the influence in particular of the work of John Soane. There is also a strong sense of aesthetic opposition to the bulk of the Modern Movement work of the same period. McMorran was, however, not narrow-minded in his attitude to the Modern Movement, and as assessor in the City of London's Golden Lane housing competition he awarded first place to the young Modernists, Chamberlin, Powell and Bon.

Donald McMorran served as Treasurer at the Royal Academy from January 1965 until his death later that year at Dorking, Surrey.

== Noted buildings ==
- Hammersmith Police Station (1939)
- Wood Field housing estate, Hampstead (1947-9)
- Barn Field housing estate, Hampstead (1947-9)
- Holloway Estate, Islington, London (1950s)
- Phoenix School, Tower Hamlets (1951-52)
- Lammas Green housing estate, Sydenham Hill, London (1955-7)
- 100 Pall Mall, London (with Duke & Simpson, 1956-58)
- Devon County Hall, Exeter (1957-64)
- University of Nottingham
  - Cripps Hall and Lenton Hall (halls of residence) (1957-9)
  - Social sciences and Education block (1960-1)
- Crescent House and the Shakespeare Public House, Golden Lane Estate, City of London (1958-62)
- Wood Street police station, City of London (1963-6)
- Suffolk Record Office, Bury St Edmunds (1963-5)
- New Shire Hall, Bury St Edmunds (1965)
- South Block of the Central Criminal Court (Old Bailey), City of London (1965)
Selected buildings

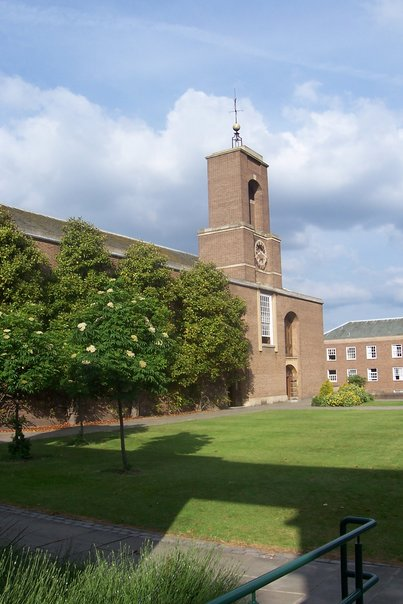
Cripps Hall at Nottingham University (1957-9)

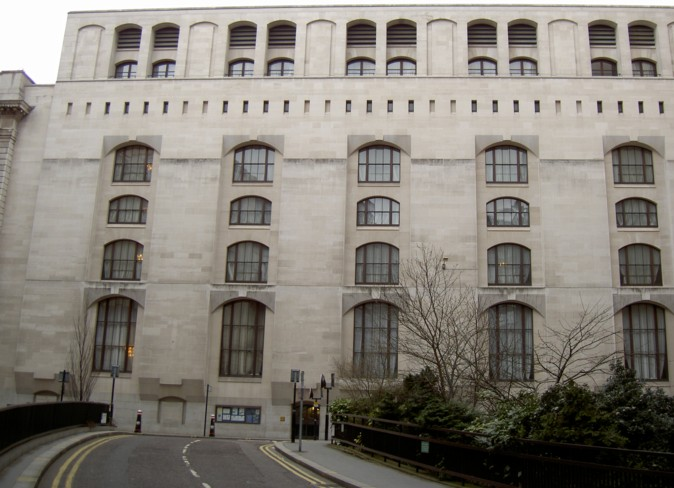
Old Bailey extension, London (1965)

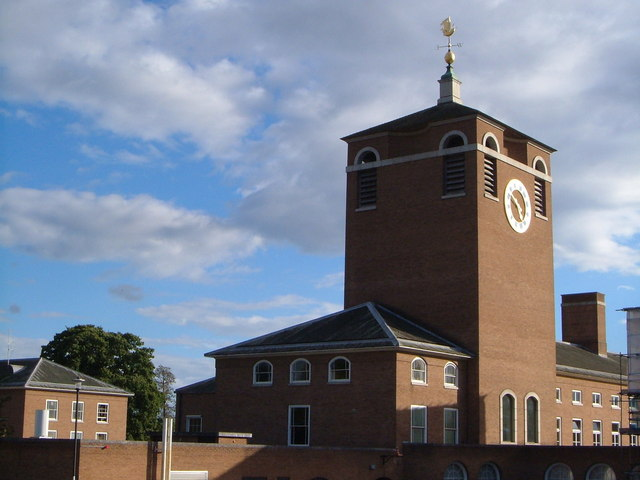
Devon County Hall, Exeter (1957-64)

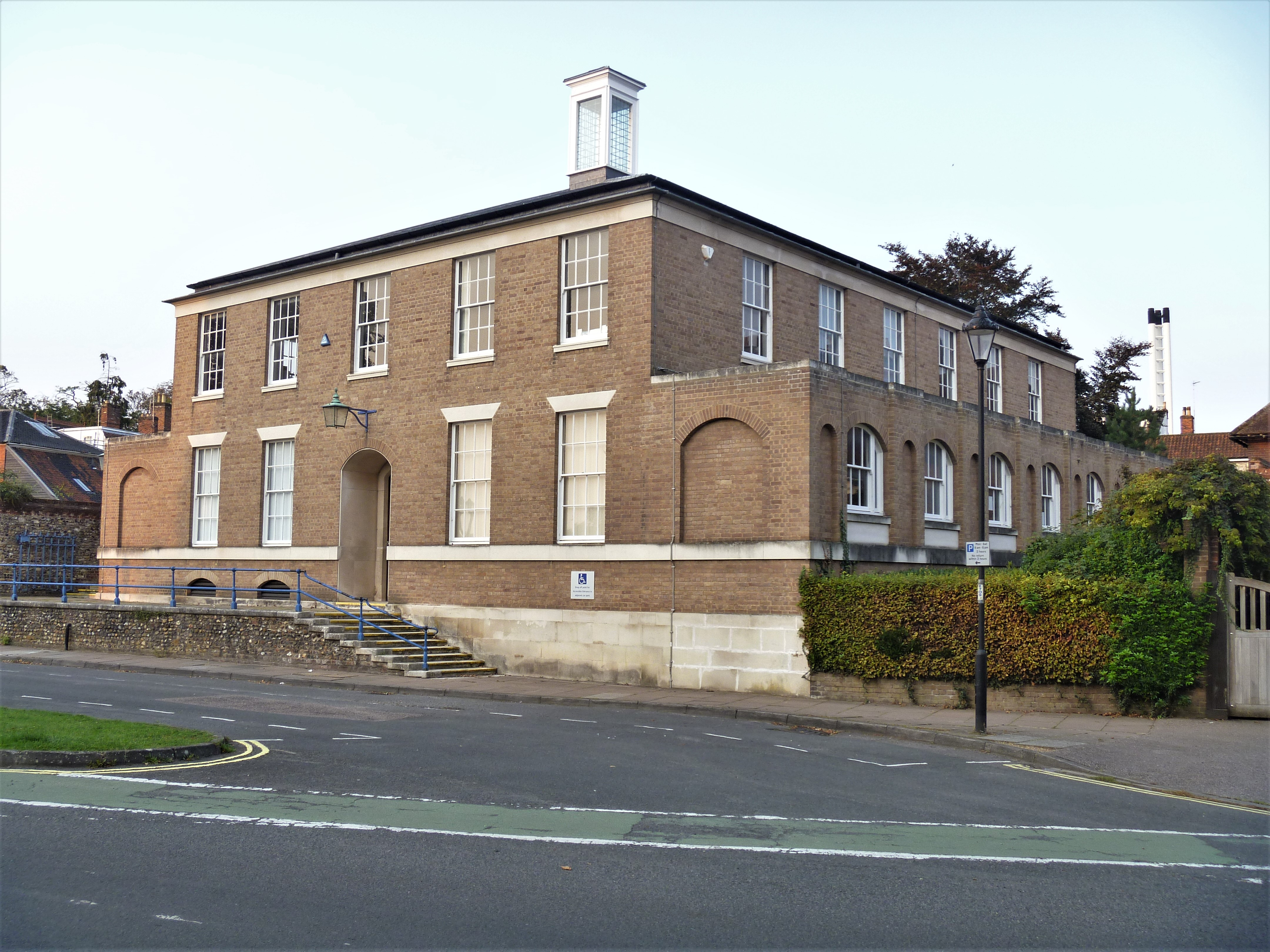
Suffolk Record Office, Bury St Edmunds (1963-5)

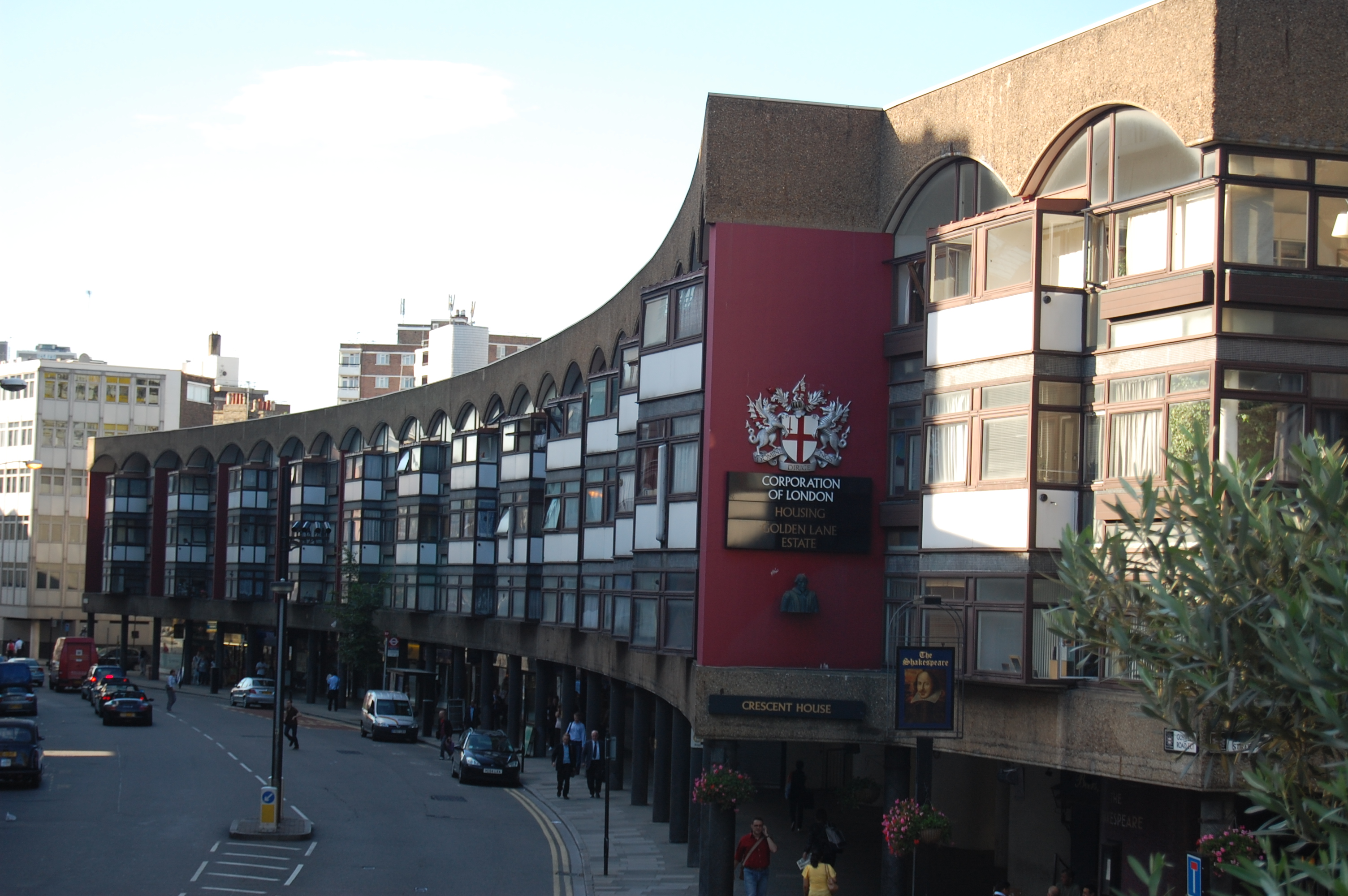
Crescent House, Golden Lane Estate (1958-62)

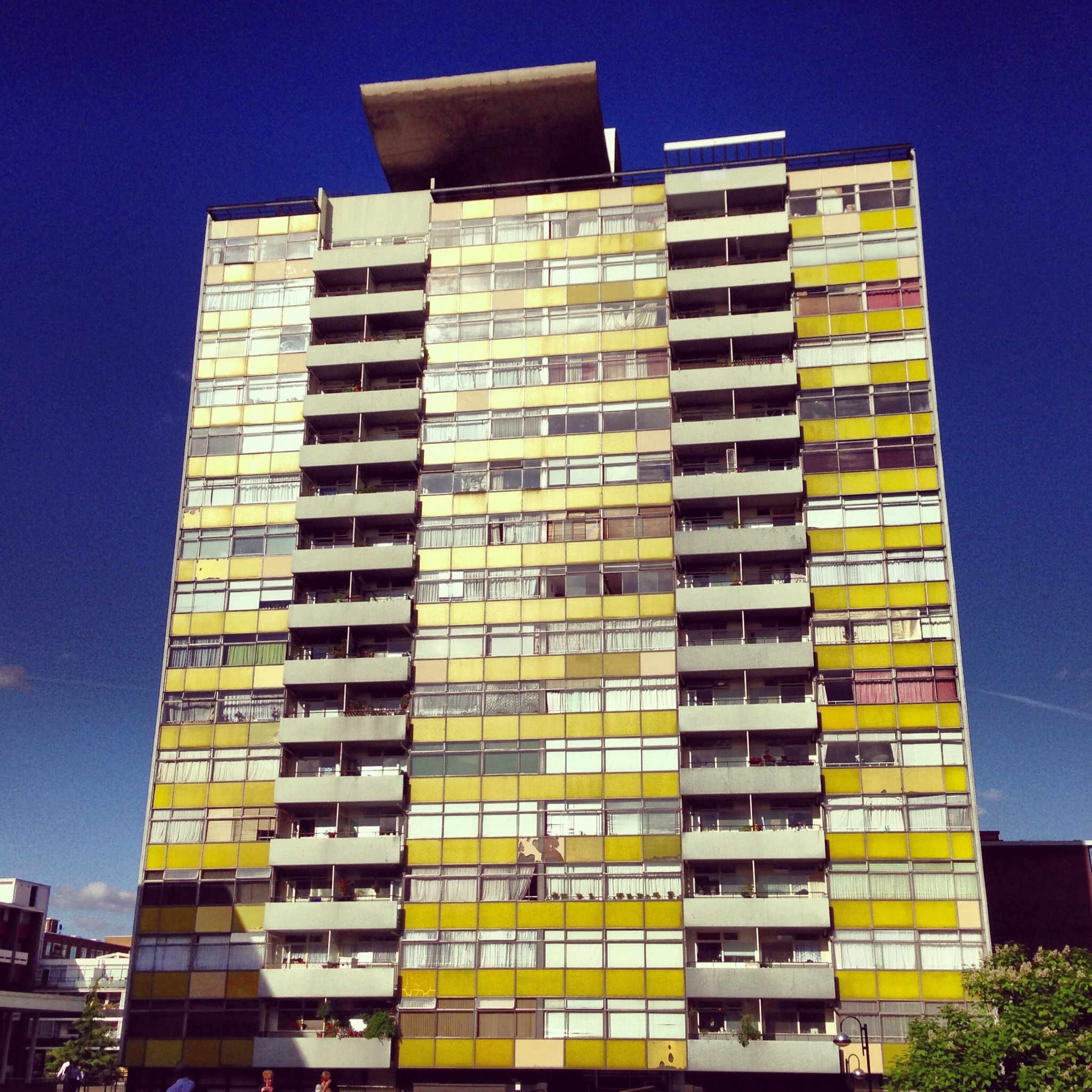
Great Arthur House, Golden Lane Estate (1953-7)

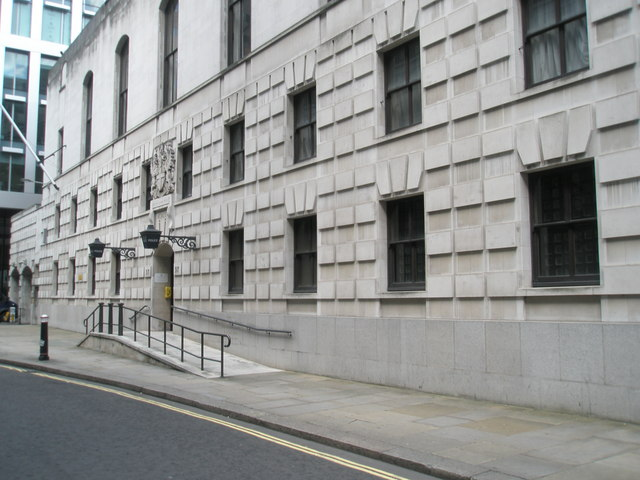
Wood Street Police Station, London (1963-6)

== Sources ==
- Denison, Edward (2009). Twentieth Century Architects: McMorran & Whitby. London: RIBA Publishing. ISBN 9781859463208.
- A. Peter Fawcett & Neil Jackson, Campus critique: the architecture of the University of Nottingham Nottingham: University of Nottingham, 1998
