= Lime Street (ward) =

Ward of the City of London

Coordinates: 51.513°N 0.082°W

- Ward
- Location within Greater London
- Lime Street ward boundaries since 2013
- OS grid reference: TQ332812
- Sui generis: City of London
- Administrative area: Greater London
- Region: London
- Country: England
- Sovereign state: United Kingdom
- Post town: LONDON
- Postcode district: EC3
- Dialling code: 020
- Police: City of London
- Fire: London
- Ambulance: London
- UK Parliament: Cities of London and Westminster
- London Assembly: City and East

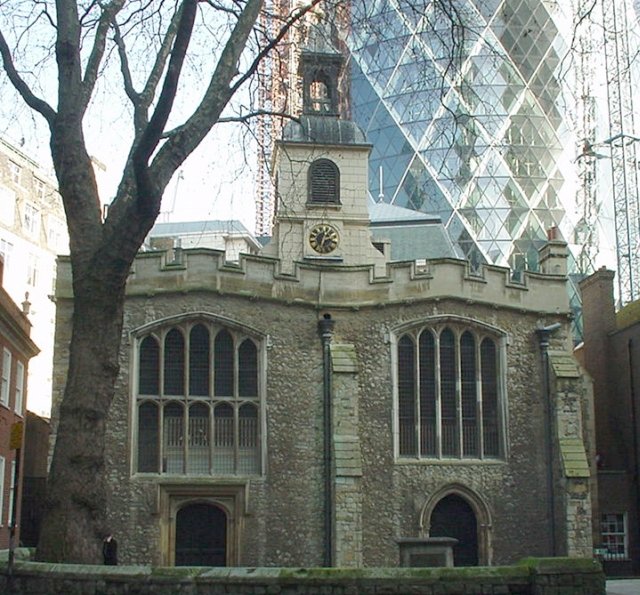
St Helen's Bishopsgate is located in Lime Street ward.

Lime Street is one of the 25 ancient wards of the City of London.

It is divided into four precincts; and it is worthy a remark that, though the ward includes parts of several parishes, there is not even a whole street in it. (John Noorthhouck, 1773)

It takes its name from the production of lime in the vicinity during medieval times. It is bounded to the north by Camomile Street, the division with Bishopsgate ward, before travelling due south along its eastern extremity, St Mary Axe (which separates it from Aldgate ward), then south-west to the southernmost point of the ward (where Lime Street itself makes a small peninsula into Langbourn ward), cutting through Leadenhall Market and from there northwards up Gracechurch Street with the ward of Cornhill to the west. Just outside the ward boundary to the east is St Ethelburga's Bishopsgate, bombed by the IRA in 1993 and restored through generous donations, such as that provided by the Lime Street Ward Club.

A well organised ward, it has a long association with the insurance industry, with the specialist market Lloyd's of London based within its boundaries at the Lloyd's building. Three major construction projects – The Pinnacle, the Leadenhall Building and 100 Bishopsgate – are within the boundaries of the ward, and these skyscrapers will dramatically increase the number of workers in the 2010s.

== Politics ==
Lime Street is one of 25 wards in the City of London, each electing an alderman to the Court of Aldermen and Commoners (the City equivalent of a councillor) to the Court of Common Council of the City of London Corporation. Only electors who are Freemen of the City of London are eligible to stand.

The ex Lord Mayor of London for 2017-18, Sir Charles Edward Beck Bowman, is its current alderman.

== Notable buildings and sites ==
- St Helen's Bishopsgate
- Leadenhall Market
- 100 Bishopsgate
- St Helen's (formerly the Commercial Union building and Aviva Tower)
- Leadenhall Building
- Lloyd's building
