= Bishopsgate (disambiguation) =

Bishopsgate was a gate in the City wall of London.

It gives its name to:

United Kingdom

- Bishopsgate, a ward and area in the City of London
- Bishopsgate, a street in the City of London
- Bishopsgate railway station, a former railway station in Shoreditch
- Bishopsgate (Low Level) railway station, a former railway station in Spitalfields

Canada

- Bishopsgate, a suburb of the County of Brant, in Ontario

Singapore

- Bishopsgate, a road in Tanglin linking Nathan Road to Jervois Road

== Other uses ==
Buildings on the street

- 8 Bishopsgate
- 22 Bishopsgate
- 99 Bishopsgate
- 100 Bishopsgate
- Bishopsgate Library
- Bishopsgate Institute, a cultural institute
- Broadgate Tower
- St Helen's Bishopsgate, church
- St Ethelburga's Bishopsgate, church
- St Botolph-without-Bishopsgate, church

Other

- Bishopsgate School, in Surrey

Events

- 1993 Bishopsgate bombing
- Bishopsgate mutiny
