= September 9 (Eastern Orthodox liturgics) =

Day in the Eastern Orthodox liturgical calendar

Eastern Orthodox liturgical calendar
September 8	September 9	September 10
September 9 O.S. ≍ September 22 N.S. September 9 N.S ≍ August 27 O.S.

An Eastern Orthodox cross

September 9 in Eastern Orthodox liturgical calendars is a feast day and a day of commemoration of saints and martyrs. Although some Orthodox churches use the Revised Julian Calendar and others use the traditional Julian calendar, the fixed commemorations for their respective September 9 are broadly the same, no matter which calendar is used. (Note: Despite the dates being the same, the days to which they refer typically differ by 13 days. The notation Old Style or O.S. is sometimes used to indicate a date in the traditional Julian Calendar (the "Old Calendar"). The notation New Style or N.S. indicates a date in the Revised Julian calendar (the "New Calendar").)

== Feasts ==
- Afterfeast of the Nativity of the Theotokos.

== Saints ==
- Holy and Righteous Ancestors of God Joachim and Anna (parents of the Theotokos). (Note: Name days celebrated today include: Joachim (Ἰωακείμ).)
- Venerable Theophanes, Confessor and Faster, of Mount Diabenos (299)
- Martyr Chariton, by the sword.
- Martyr Severian of Sebaste (320) (Note: "At Sebaste, St. Severian, a soldier of the emperor Licinius. For frequently visiting the Forty Martyrs whilst they were in prison, he was suspended in the air with a stone tied to his feet by order of the governor Lysias, and being scourged and torn with whips, yielded up his soul in the midst of torments.")
- Saint Rufus, Bishop of Thessaloniki from 407 (434)
- Saint Agathocles of Koroni, Bishop of Koroni and a father of the Third Ecumenical Council (5th century)

== Pre-Schism Western saints ==
- Martyrs Hyacinth, Alexander and Tiburtius, martyrs in the Sabine country in Italy, about thirty miles from Rome. (Note: "Among the Sabines, thirty miles from Rome, the holy martyrs Hyacinthus, Alexander, and Tiburtius.")
- Saint Kieran of Clonmacnoise (Ciaran, Kyran), one of the Twelve Apostles of Ireland and first Abbot of Clonmacnoise (c. 545) (Note: Called 'The Younger'. He was born in Connacht, and was trained in the monastic life by St Finian of Clonard, one of the 'Twelve Apostles of Ireland'. He later founded Clonmacnois in West Meath and gave his monks an ascetic rule, 'The Law of Kieran'.)
- Saint Osmanna (Argariarga), a holy virgin who left Ireland for Brittany and became an anchoress in a hermitage near Saint-Brieuc (c. 650)
- Saint Omer (Audomarus), Bishop of Therouanne (670) (Note: Born near Constance in Switzerland, he became a monk at Luxeuil and after some twenty years Bishop of Thérouanne in the north of France. In order to enlighten the region, St Omer covered the area with monasteries. The saint himself helped found the monastery of Sithin, around which grew up the town now known as Saint Omer.)
- Saint Bettelin (Beccel), Hermit of Crowland (8th century) (Note: Disciple of St Guthlac of Crowland in England. He lived there with companions under the first abbot, Kenulf.)
- Saint Wulfhilda of Barking, Abbess of Barking, Abbess of Horton, both in England (c. 1000) (Note: "ST. WULFILDA was of a noble English family, and built and endowed with her own estate the Abbey of Horton, in Dorsetshire. When the Abbey of Barking was reconstituted, after the dilapidations of the Danes, by the zeal of King Edgar, Wulfilda was appointed Abbess. Her rule was so blessed, that under her the house again flourished in its primitive perfection, in observance, and the holy lives of the religious. It appears that the Saint presided at the same time over this monastery and that of Horton. In the troubles which followed the death of Edgar, she was expelled by Queen Elfthrytha, but was restored, according to her own prediction, by Ethelred. Her venerated remains were buried at Barking; and when translated, thirty years later, were found wholly incorrupt, as though they had only just been interred. So many and so striking were the miracles wrought at her shrine, that St. Wulfilda received equal veneration with her great predecessors, St. Ethelburga and St. Hildelitha.")

== Post-Schism Orthodox saints ==
- Blessed Nicetas the Hidden, of Constantinople (12th century)
- Venerable Joseph, founder of Volokolamsk (Volotsk) Monastery, Wonderworker (1515)
- Venerable Joachim, founder of Opochka Monastery, Pskov (c. 1550)
- Saint Joachim, monk of the St. Nicholas-Shartomsk Monastery in Suzdal (1625)
- Saint Cyriacus of Tazlau Monastery, Moldavia (1660)
- Venerable Onuphrius of Vorona, Moldavia (1789) (Note: See: (in Romanian) Cuviosul Onufrie. Wikipedia. (Romanian Wikipedia).)

=== New martyrs and confessors ===
- New Hieromartyrs Gregory Garyev, Priest and Alexander Ipatov, Deacon (1918)
- New Hieromartyr Zachariah (Lobov), Archbishop of Voronezh (1937) (Note: See: (in Russian) Захария (Лобов). Википедии. (Russian Wikipedia).)
- New Hieromartyrs Sergius Uklonsky, Joseph Arkharov, Alexis Uspensky, Priests (1937)
- New Hieromartyr Dmitry Troitsky, Deacon (1937)
- New Martyr Basil Shikalov (1937)
- New Hieromartyr Andronicus (Surikov), Hieromonk, of Moscow (1938)
- New Hieromartyr Alexander Vinogradov, Priest (1942)

== Other commemorations ==
- Commemoration of the Third Ecumenical Council (431) (Note: The Holy Third Oecumenical Council banished the heresy of Nestorius and proclaimed that the Holy Virgin is truly Theotokos – 'She who bare God in her womb.')
- Uncovering and Translation of the Relics (1896) of St. Theodosius, Archbishop of Chernigov (1696) (Note: See: (in Russian) Феодосий Черниговский. Википедии. (Russian Wikipedia).)
- Synaxis of the Elders of the Glinsk Monastery:

- Venerable Vasily (Kishkin)
- Venerable Philaret (Danilovsky)
- Venerable Theodoty (Levchenko)
- Venerable Makary (Sharov)
- Venerable Martiry (Kirichenko)
- Venerable Evfimy (Lyubimchenko)
- Venerable Dosithy (Kolchenkov)
- Venerable Iliadore (Golovantsky)
- Venerable Innokenty (Stepanov)
- Venerable Luke (Shvets)
- Venerable Archipy (Shestakov)
- Venerable Ioanniky (Gomolko)
- Venerable Seraphim (Amelin)
- Venerable Adronik (Lukash)
- Venerable Sraphim (Romantsov)
- Venerable Zinovy (Mazhugi), Metropolitan of Tetritsqaro (Seraphim in the schema).

- Repose of Elder Joachim of St. Anne’s Skete, Mount Athos (1950)
- Translation of the Relics (1992) of St. Gabriel of Białystok

== Icon gallery ==
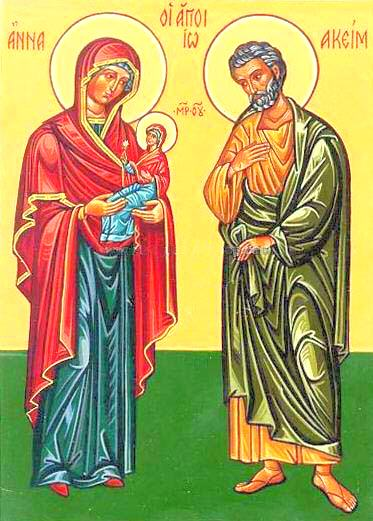
Holy and Righteous Ancestors of God Joachim and Anna.

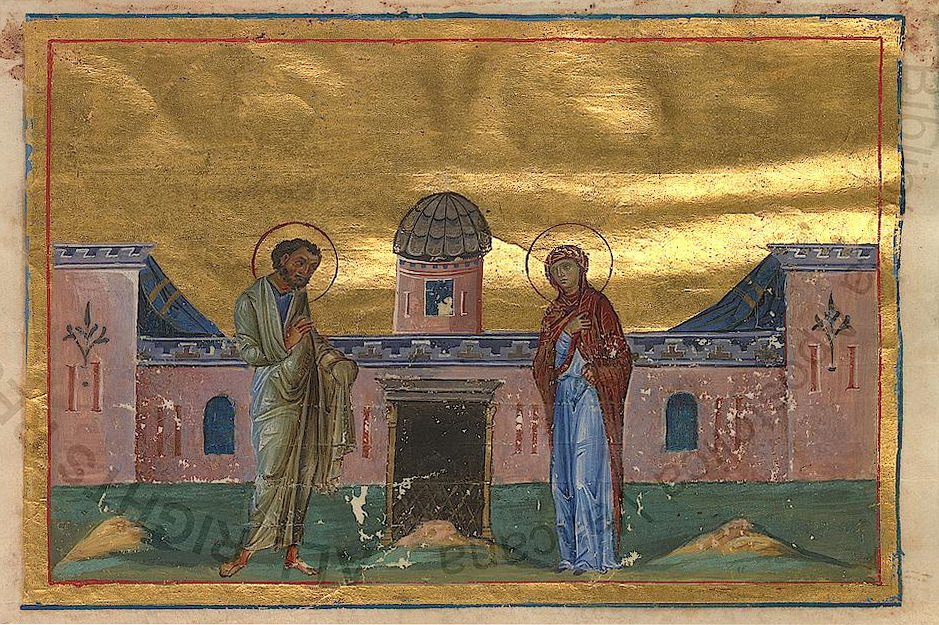
Holy and Righteous Ancestors of God Joachim and Anna.
(Menologion of Basil II, 10th century).

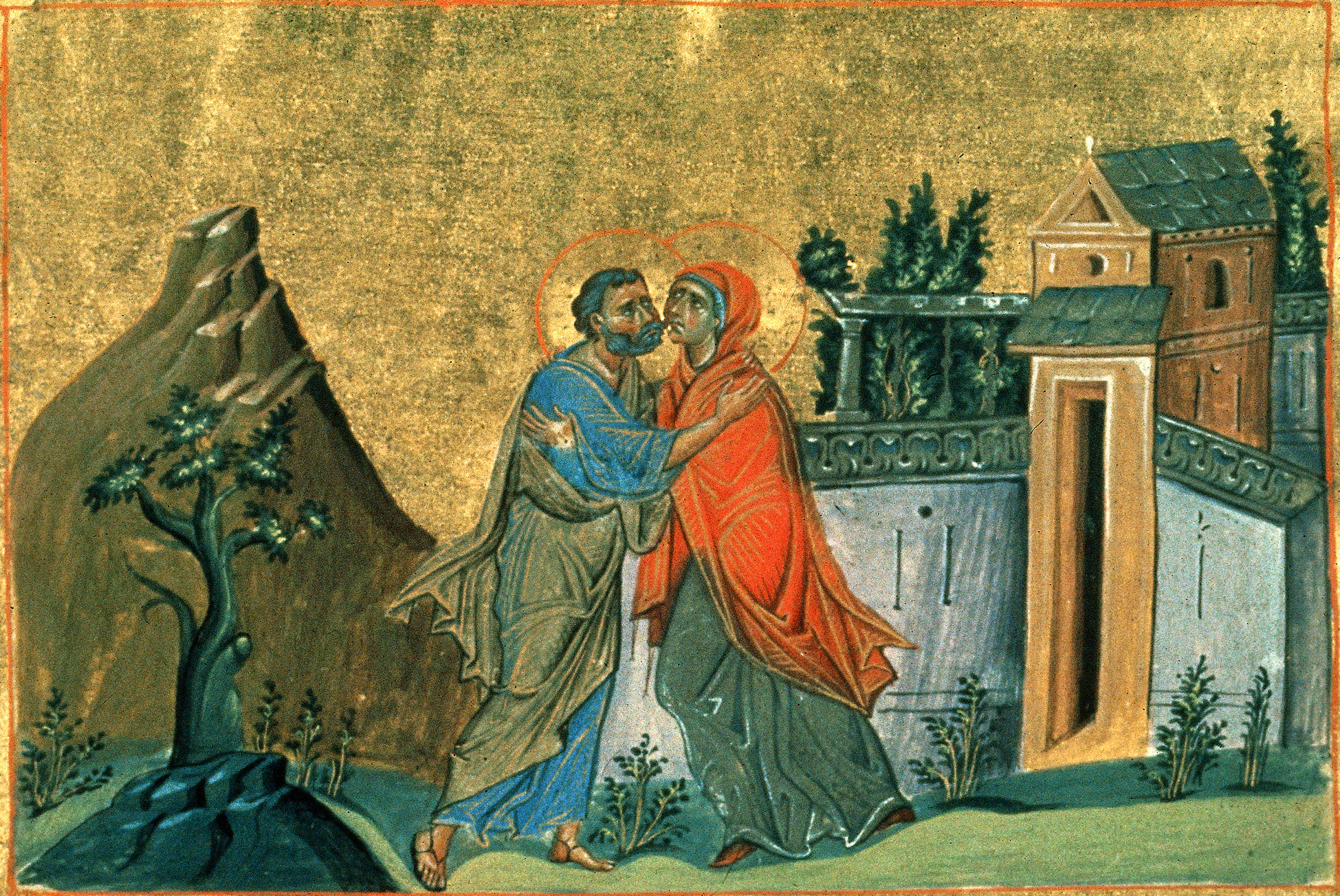
Holy and Righteous Ancestors of God Joachim and Anna (Meeting at the Golden gate).
(Menologion of Basil II, 10th century).

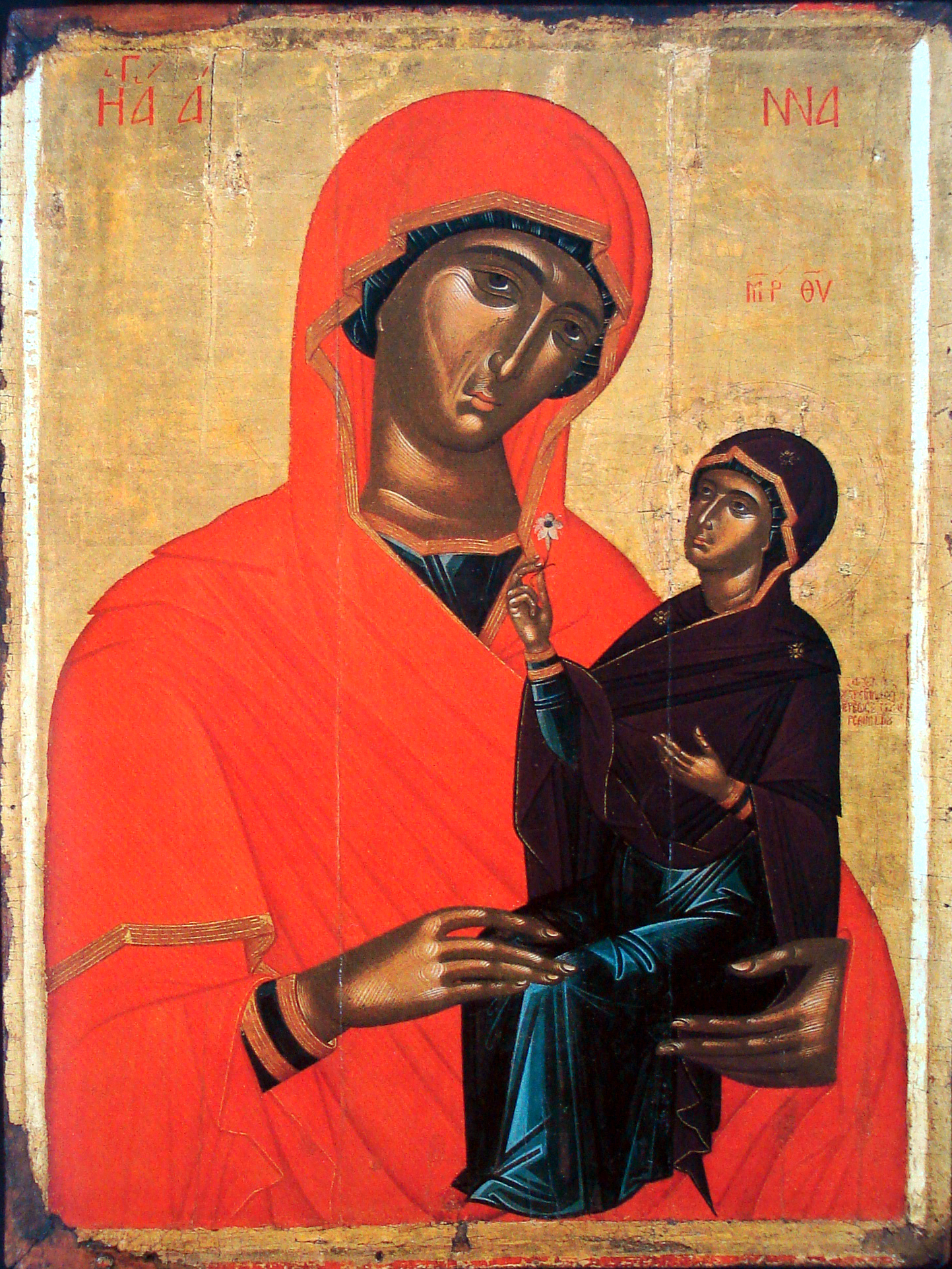
St. Anna.

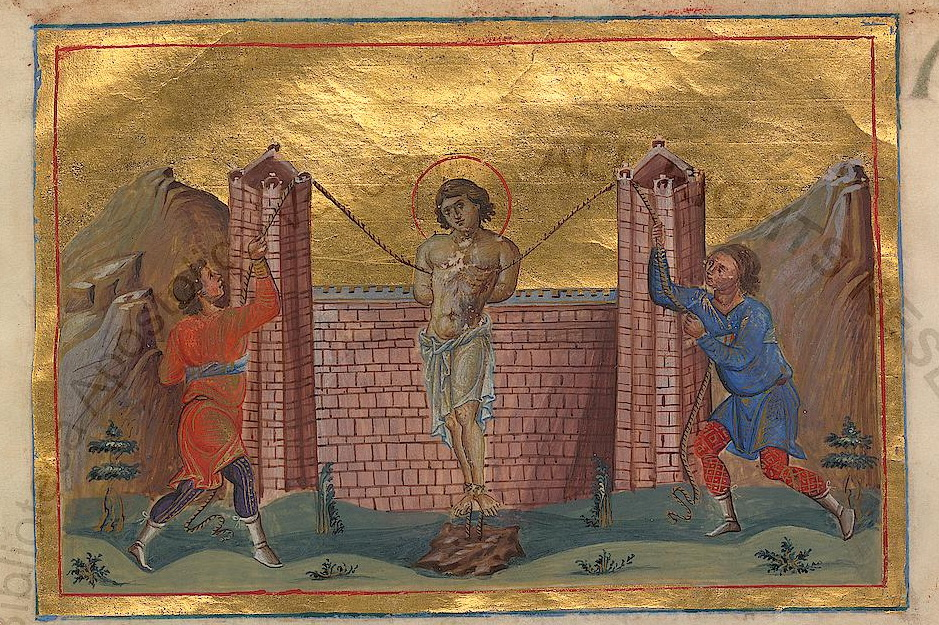
St. Severian of Sebaste, one of the Forty Martyrs of Sebaste.
(Menologion of Basil II, 10th century).

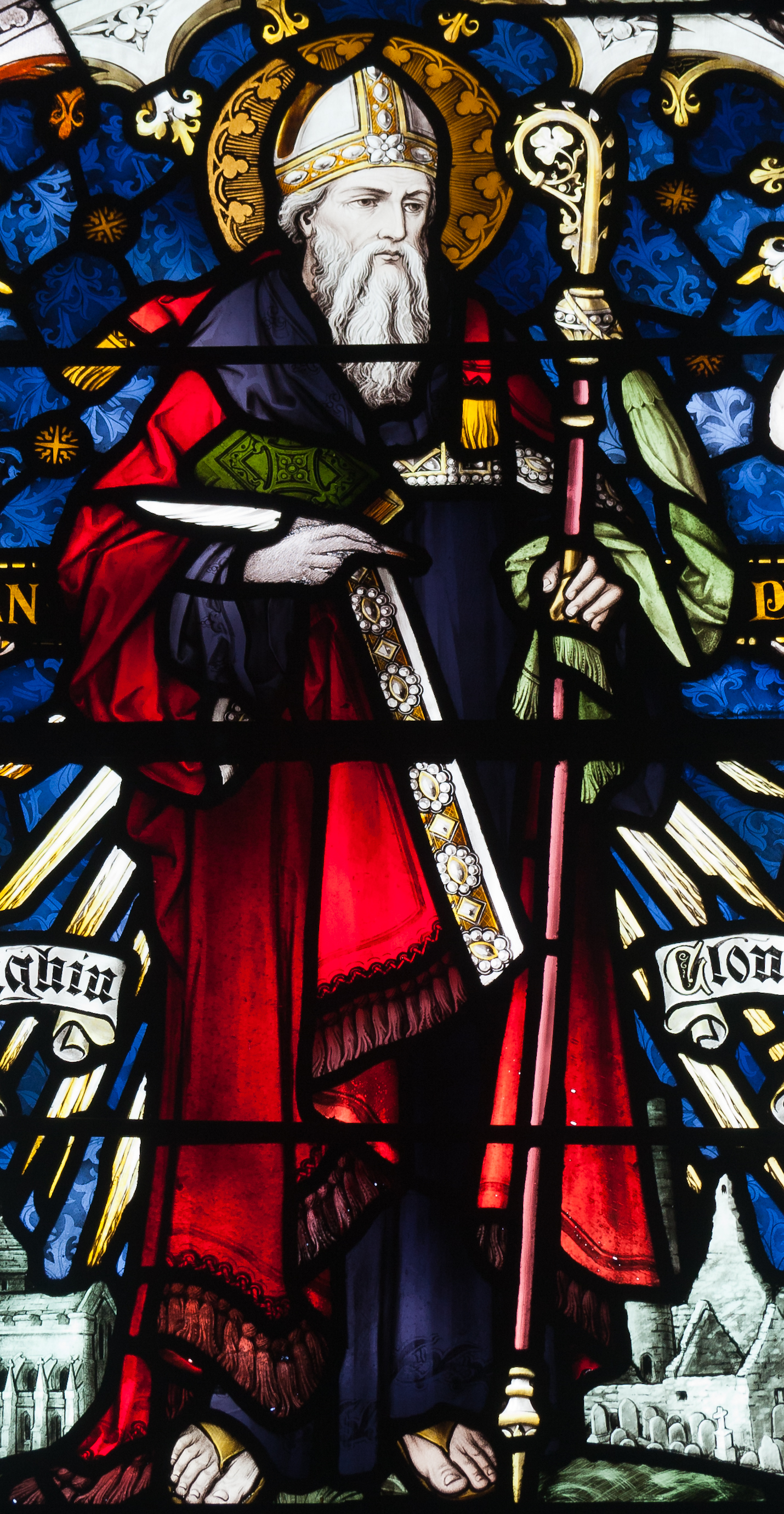
St. Kieran of Clonmacnoise.

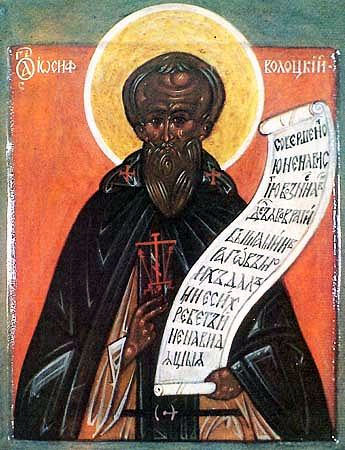
Venerable Joseph, founder of Volokolamsk Monastery.

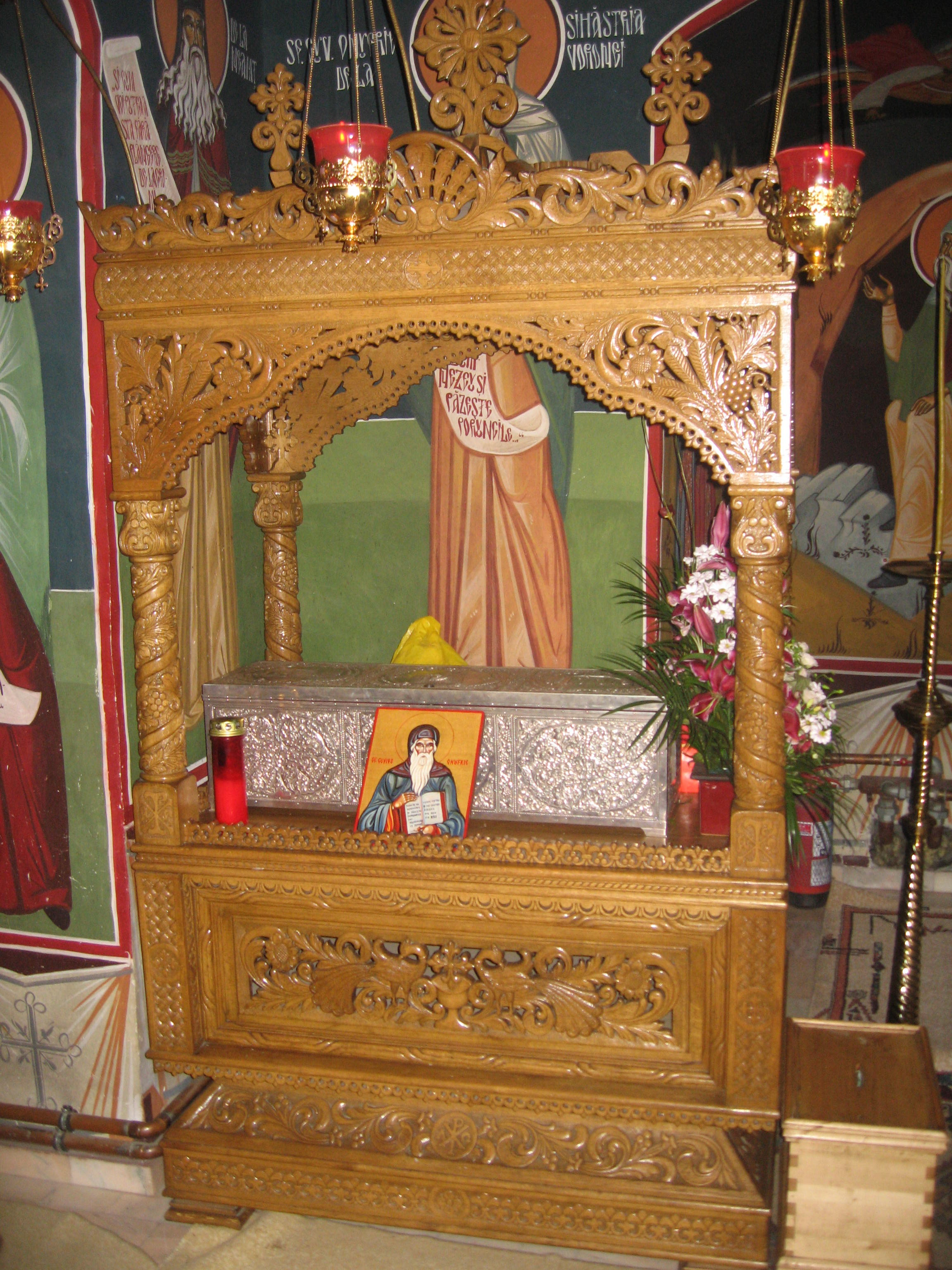
Relics of St. Onuphrius of Vorona, Moldavia.

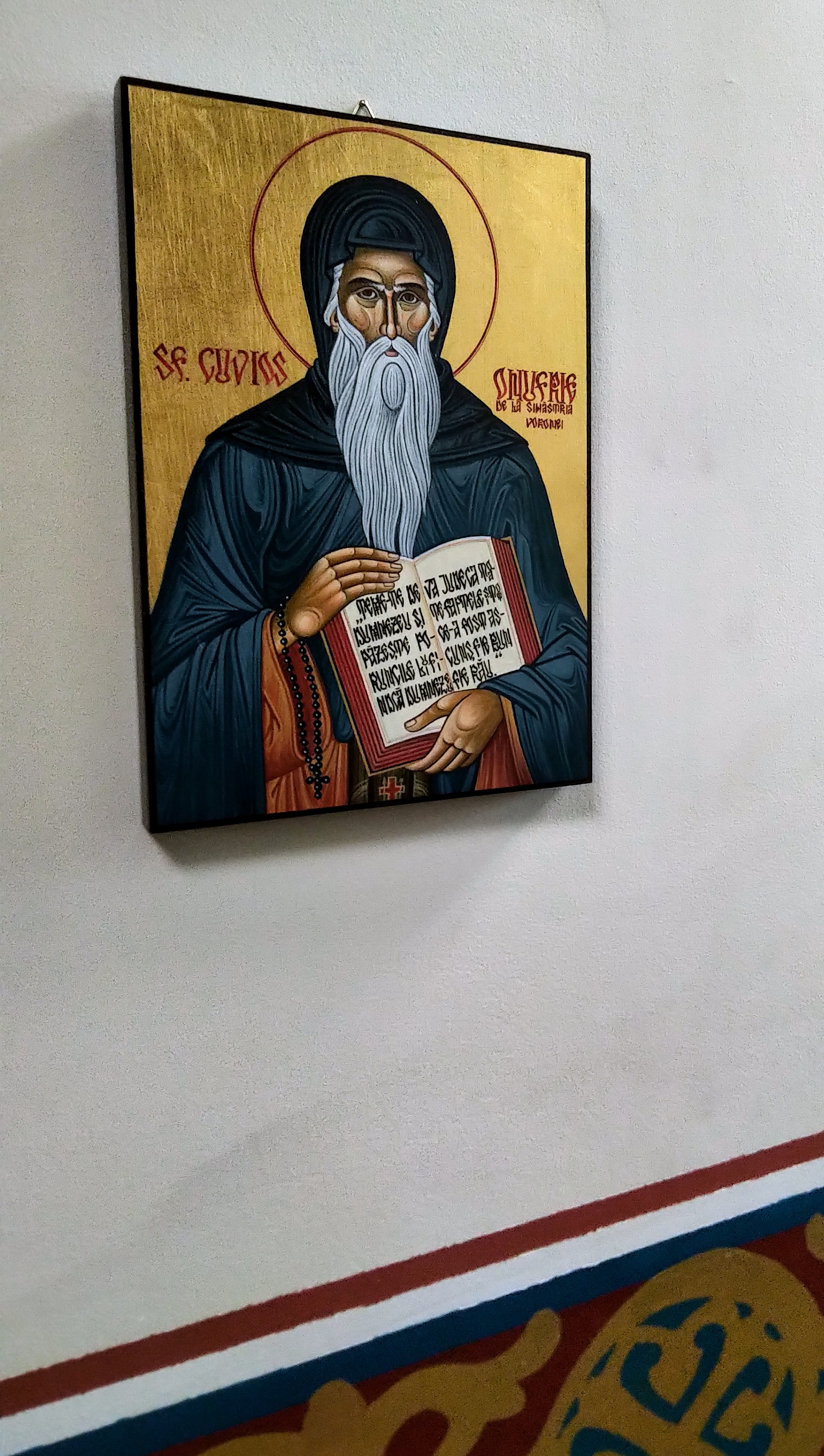
Venerable Onuphrius of Vorona, Moldavia.

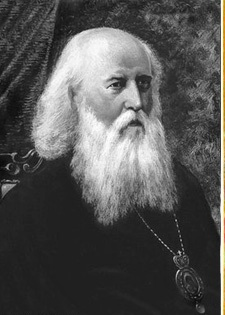
New Hieromartyr Zachariah (Lobov), Archbishop of Voronezh.

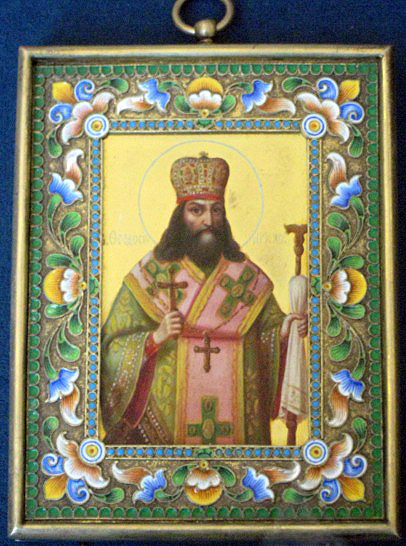
St. Theodosius, Archbishop of Chernigov.

== Sources ==
- September 9/September 22. Orthodox Calendar (PRAVOSLAVIE.RU).
- September 22 / September 9. HOLY TRINITY RUSSIAN ORTHODOX CHURCH (A parish of the Patriarchate of Moscow).
- September 9. OCA - The Lives of the Saints.
- The Autonomous Orthodox Metropolia of Western Europe and the Americas (ROCOR). St. Hilarion Calendar of Saints for the year of our Lord 2004. St. Hilarion Press (Austin, TX). p. 67.
- The Ninth Day of the Month of September. Orthodoxy in China.
- September 9. Latin Saints of the Orthodox Patriarchate of Rome.
- The Roman Martyrology. Transl. by the Archbishop of Baltimore. Last Edition, According to the Copy Printed at Rome in 1914. Revised Edition, with the Imprimatur of His Eminence Cardinal Gibbons. Baltimore: John Murphy Company, 1916. pp. 277–278.
- Rev. Richard Stanton. A Menology of England and Wales, or, Brief Memorials of the Ancient British and English Saints Arranged According to the Calendar, Together with the Martyrs of the 16th and 17th Centuries. London: Burns & Oates, 1892. pp. 441–443.

Greek Sources

- Great Synaxaristes: (in Greek) 9 ΣΕΠΤΕΜΒΡΙΟΥ. ΜΕΓΑΣ ΣΥΝΑΞΑΡΙΣΤΗΣ.
- (in Greek) Συναξαριστής. 9 Σεπτεμβρίου. ECCLESIA.GR. (H ΕΚΚΛΗΣΙΑ ΤΗΣ ΕΛΛΑΔΟΣ).
- (in Greek) 09/09/2026. Ορθόδοξος Συναξαριστής.

Russian Sources

- (in Russian) 22 сентября (9 сентября). Православная Энциклопедия под редакцией Патриарха Московского и всея Руси Кирилла (электронная версия). (Orthodox Encyclopedia - Pravenc.ru).
- (in Russian) 9 сентября по старому стилю / 22 сентября по новому стилю. Русская Православная Церковь - Православный церковный календарь на 2026 год.
