= Bishopsgate (street) =

Street in the City of London

For other uses, see Bishopsgate (disambiguation)

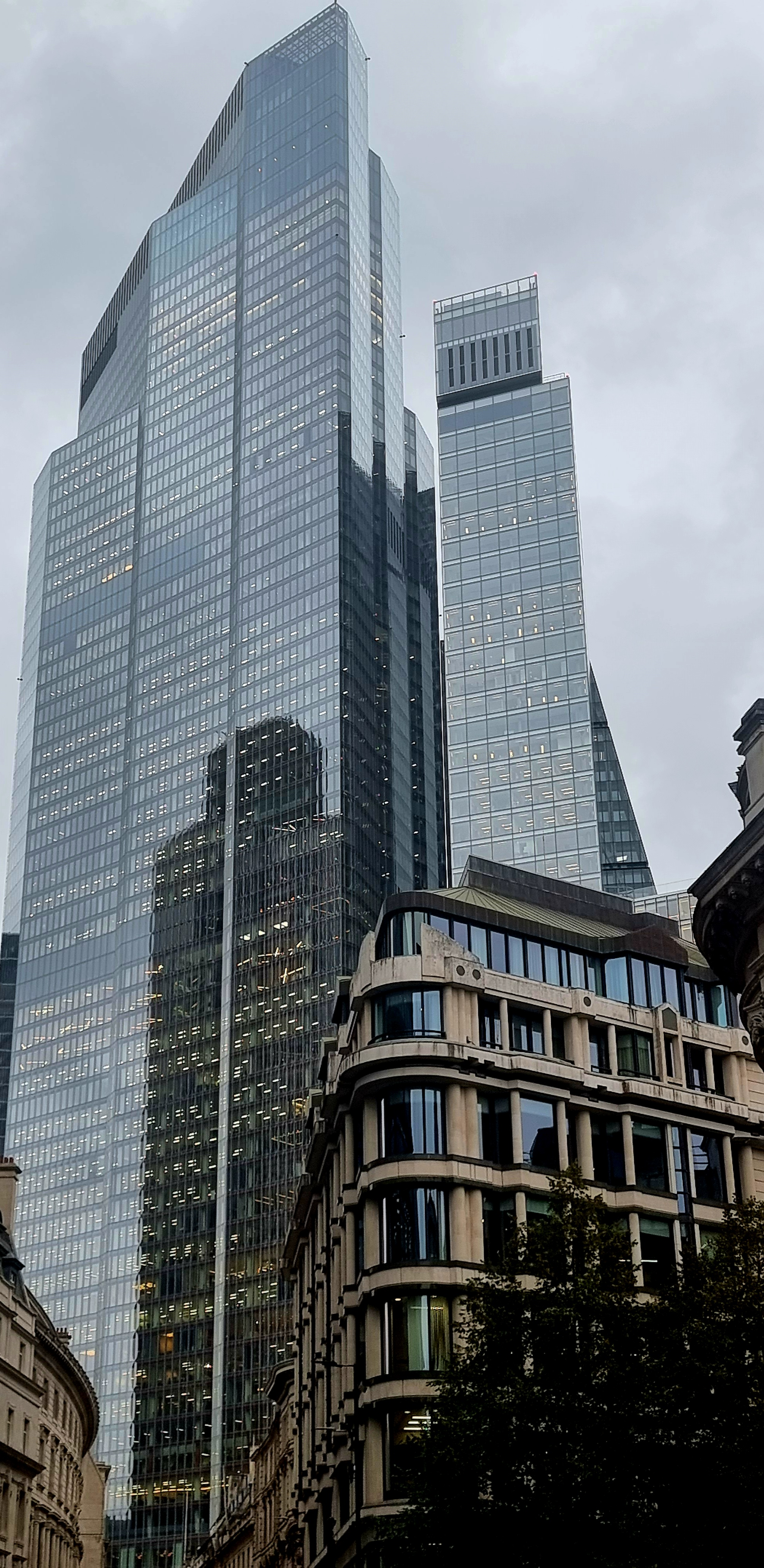
22 Bishopgate

The street known as Bishopsgate in the City of London bears the same name as the gate in London’s defensive wall through which it passed. It was part of the Roman Ermine Street, the main route northwards out of London. It now forms part of the A10. It is approximately 0.5 miles (800 metres) in length and links Gracechurch Street to the south with Norton Folgate to the north.

The street has a wide variety of buildings. The most prominent is 22 Bishopsgate, 278 m tall, the highest building in the City of London. 135-175 Bishopsgate has the largest footprint, 244 m long, extending over the eastern platforms of Liverpool Street station. Some older buildings (such as 174 Bishopsgate) are merely 3 m wide. The tiny St Ethelburga’s is one of the few surviving medieval churches in London.

== History ==
Bishopsgate follows the line of a street in Roman Londinium, which ran north out of the City from the Basilica Forum. The gate in the Roman and medieval city wall, through which the street passed, was one of the principal entrances to the City. The street takes its name from the gate, although the street pre-dates the wall. The location of the gate, which was demolished in 1760, is marked by a bronze bishop’s mitre at first floor level of 105-115 Bishopsgate.

The street appears in a map of London in 1270 named “Bisshoppesgatestrete”. The area outside the walls, known as Bishopsgate Without, included the priory and hospital of St Mary of Bethlehem, known as ‘Bedlam’, one of oldest hospitals specialising in mental illness. It was founded in 1247 on the site now occupied by Liverpool Street station, moving to Moorfields in 1676. The church of St Botolph without Bishopsgate had been present since Saxon times, but was replaced by the present church in 1728. The only survivor from the medieval period is St Ethelburga’s, first recorded in 1250, rebuilt in its current form around 1411.

There were many coaching inns on Bishopsgate. The White Hart Inn (now 119-121 Bishopsgate), said to be from 1480, was claimed to be the oldest, although rebuilt in 1829. The taverns were such significant centres of commerce that they issued their own currency for use as change.

John Stow’s Survey of London in 1603 describes a mixture of churches, inns, tenement houses and “fair and large built houses for merchants, and such like”. Mansions included those of John Crosby and Thomas Gresham. The façade of the timber-framed house of Sir Paul Pindar, built c1599, is now in the Victoria and Albert Museum. John Strype’s Survey of the Cities of London and Westminster in 1720 observed that “the houses for the most part are old timber buildings and nothing uniform. The like are the parts without the Gate, but not so good, except in some places”.

Bishopsgate was largely unaffected by the Great Fire of London in 1666, although the southern part between Threadneedle Street and Cornhill was destroyed by a fire in 1765. As a result, Bishopsgate retained some of the character of the city before the fire.

During the 18th century, wooden buildings were replaced by 4-storey brick buildings, as shown in a pictorial record by John Tallis in 1838. Many of these were photographed before they were demolished in 1911. A few still survive (46, 50 and 192 Bishopsgate).

In the 19th century, Bishopsgate was a busy high street with a mixture of shops, trades, coffee houses and inns, such as Dirty Dicks (202-204 Bishopsgate). It was the first in the City to use the new gas lighting. There were numerous overcrowded slum-like side streets, some of which were cleared to make way for Liverpool Street station, which opened in 1874. The taverns on the west side of Bishopsgate Within were replaced by ornate banking halls, many now listed buildings (3-13 Bishopsgate). In the late 19th century, the east side of Bishopsgate Without was renewed with 5-storey brick buildings, several of which survive (152-174 Bishopsgate). Buildings in this period mainly followed and preserved the pre-existing pattern of courts and alleys (such as Catherine Wheel Alley, Rose Alley and Swedeland Court).

In 1911 Bishopsgate Streets Within and Without were merged into a single street named Bishopsgate. In 1932 the junction of Bishopsgate and Cornhill became the first to have vehicle-actuated traffic lights. Except for a few buildings beside Liverpool Street station, Bishopsgate almost entirely escaped bomb damage during World War II.

The transformation of Bishopsgate into a street of tall towers began in 1976 with the completion of the 104 m high 99 Bishopsgate. This was overshadowed by the nearby 183 m high National Westminster Bank Tower on Old Broad Street (backing onto its headquarters at 15 Bishopsgate), completed in 1980, then the tallest in the UK.

The Broadgate development around Liverpool Street station took a different approach, with a 244 m long building known as a “groundscraper” at 135-175 Bishopsgate, completed in 1991.

The 1993 Bishopsgate bombing, using a truck parked outside 99 Bishopsgate, caused extensive damage to buildings in the street, as well as destroying St Ethelburga’s church and causing the death of a photojournalist. Since then, the damaged buildings have been reconstructed, while new office buildings continue to prefer glass walls.

The 230 m high Heron Tower (110 Bishopsgate) was the tallest in the City when completed in 2011. This title is now held by 22 Bishopsgate, a 278 m high tower completed in 2021.

Planning applications have been approved for a 269 m high tower at 55 Bishopsgate and a 238 m high tower at 99 Bishopsgate.
