= Nestingum =

Name given to an ancestor of Saint Wulfhilde

Nestingum is the name said to have been given by King Alfred the Great of England to a legendary foundling who was identified as an ancestor of Saint Wulfhilde of Barking (fl. 980), as set out in her genealogy in Goscelin's life of the saint.

== Biography ==
Goscelin's account, written c. 1060 about purported events dating to the late 9th century, may have its source in a lost tradition of Wilton nunnery, with the aim of providing Wulfhilde with a royal lineage; the name is said to be early Old English, but appears in no other contemporary text. Translated from Latin:

Alfred king of the English, travelling in a wood at some speed in pursuit of game, by chance heard the voice of a crying infant. He diligently made to inquire what the matter was from the crowd of hunters. They discovered at the top of a tree, in an eagle's nest, an infant remarkable for its most elegant and noble form, wrapped in a purple cloak, having on his body a mark, just like a royal sign, and on his arms twin bracelets made of gold – evidence of nobility. The king baptised him after the Christian fashion, and named him in the native tongue after the nest "Nestingum"; also according to his worthy appearance of noble birth it came about that he had him regally educated as a princeps [prince] and comes [count], fitted with a spouse and the riches of all his rank. He was also adept in the noble arts. Nor was the distinction of his ancestors (of which he was wholly deserving) concealed. He begat Wihtrod, who in the greatness of things and offspring, and also in the probity of character took after his father. Wihtbrod begat Wulfhelm, father of the virgin Wulfhilde who was pleasing to God ....

In Tennyson's poem "The Last Tournament", part of his Arthurian cycle, Idylls of the King, the story of the nestling nursed by Guinevere was inspired by the legend of Nestingum as recounted in Sharon Turner's History of the Anglo-Saxons, and perhaps in Bishop Stanley's Book of Birds.
