= Helen Whittaker =

British stained glass artist (born 1974)

Helen Whittaker MBE
- Born: 23 July 1974 (age 52); Ashton-under-Lyne, Tameside, England
- Education: Leeds Beckett University; University of Sunderland; Prince's Foundation
- Known for: Stained glass
- Elected: Art Workers' Guild; British Society of Master Glass Painters

Helen Whittaker (born 23 July 1974) MBE is a British artist and designer. She is best known for her stained glass windows and architectural sculpture in glass and copper.

== Biography ==
Whittaker was born on 23 July 1974 in Ashton-under-Lyne, Tameside. She studied a foundation degree in Business Management at Leeds Beckett University and 3D Design in Glass and Ceramics at the University of Sunderland, then was a Craft Scholar of the Prince’s Foundation.

Whittaker is a British artist and designer, best known for her stained glass windows and architectural sculpture in glass and copper. She is the Creative Director at Barley Studio, based in York. She is a member of the Art Workers’ Guild and a Fellow of the British Society of Master Glass Painters.

In 2019, Whittaker featured in a UK Government campaign to showcase British creative talent.

In 2024, Whittaker was appointed a Member of the Order of the British Empire (MBE) in the King’s 2024 Birthday Honours. She was elected as one of the first two honorary craftspersons' of York's Company of Merchant Taylors, alongside stonemason Freya De Lisle, having designed and created the East Window in the Great Hall of the Merchant Taylors Hall in York.

== Works ==
=== Stained glass ===
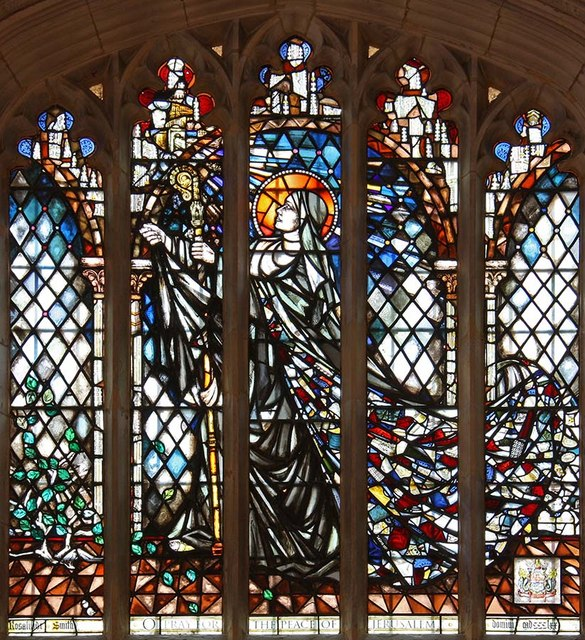
Whittaker's window depicting St Ethelburga at St Ethelburga's Bishopsgate, London

Whittaker won the Stevens Competition Commission in 2002 to create a new east window for Ellerton Priory in Swaledale, North Yorkshire.

In 2009, Whittaker designed and created a stained glass window depicting St Ethelburga at St Ethelburga's Bishopgate in London. That year, she also designed and created a stained glass window for St Mary's Church in Sheffield, South Yorkshire, which was dedicated by the Archbishop of York John Sentamu. She designed the stained glass window celebrating the Bicentenary of the Bramley Apple for Southwell Minster in Southwell, Nottinghamshire.

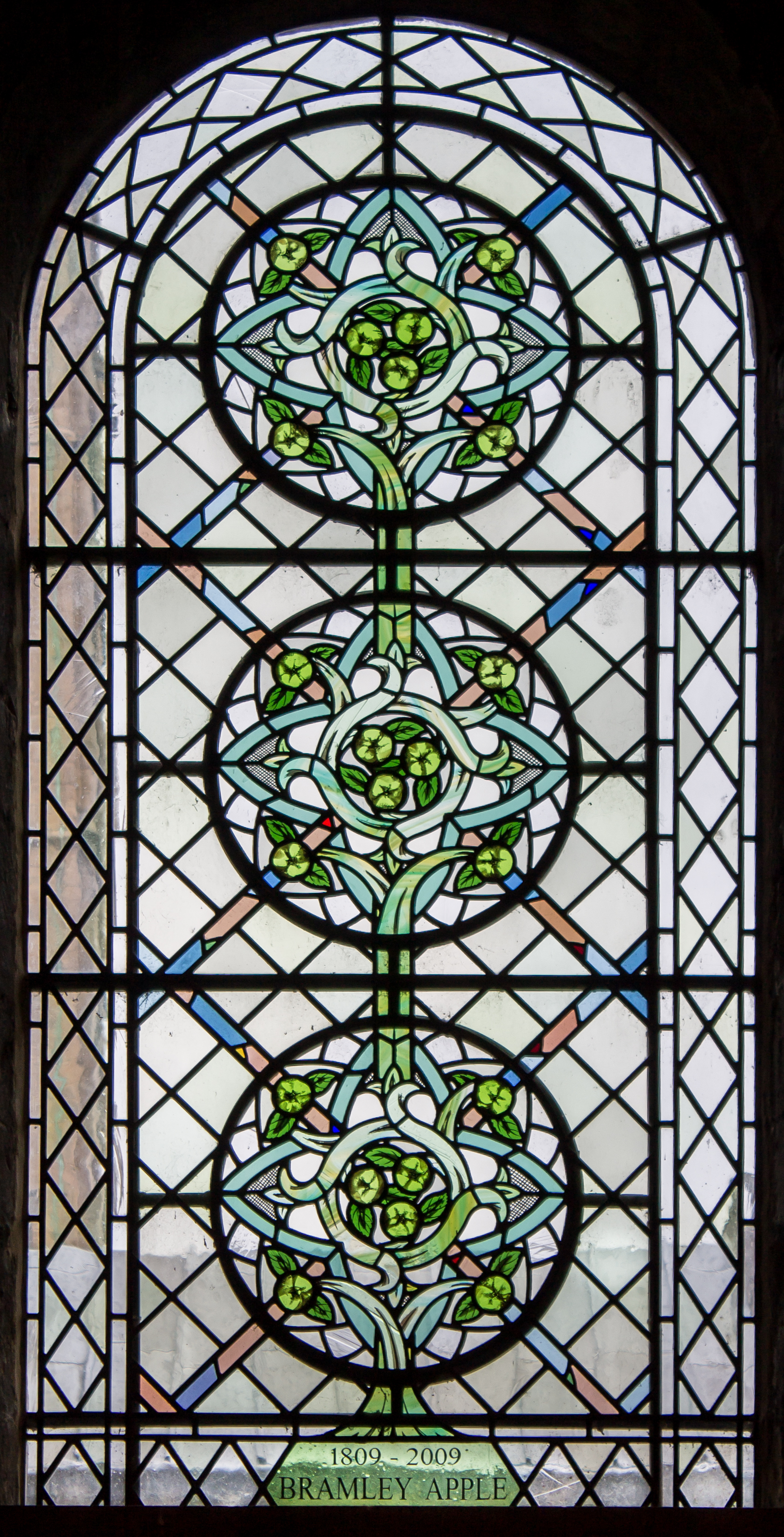
Southwell Minster in Nottinghamshire

In 2014, Whittaker worked on a restoration project at St Brandon’s Church, in Brancepeth, County Durham, which was completed sixteen years after a devastating fire. The project included designing a stained glass window inspired by the story of Brendan the Navigator as told in The Voyage of Saint Brandon.

In 2015, Whittaker designed and created a stained glass window commemorating troops who served in the War in Afghanistan at the All Saints Church, Pavement in York. The window pays a special tribute to three men from York who were killed in action, with the names recorded on individual stones alongside their regimental badges. The window appeared on ITV4’s Made in Britain television show in 2021.

In 2018, Whittaker created a stained glass window celebrating the reign of Queen Elizabeth II's for the north transept of Westminster Abbey. The design for the window was by artist David Hockney.

In 2023, Whittaker designed and created a new stained glass window for All Saints Church in Wetheringsett in Suffolk. That year, she also worked on the largest stained-glass installation in the Philippines, designing six 20 metre high windows for a new space at Our Lady of Lourdes Chapel in Filinvest City in Muntinlupa.

In 2024, Whittaker designed and created a new stained glass window for Selby Abbey in Selby, North Yorkshire. The piece depicts "the agony of Jesus in the Garden of Gethsemane as he awaits his betrayal and arrest" and is the Anglican churches' first new stained glass window in ninety years.

Other works include autumn themed window at St Peter and St Mary Church in Stowmarket, Suffolk (2006); a window at the Royal Air Force Club in Piccadilly, Westminster, London (2008); the Tree of Jesse Window at St Mary’s Priory Church in Abergavenny, Monmouthshire, Wales (2016); and the "Hope" window at St Michael's Church in Highgate, London (2024).

=== Sculpture ===
Whittaker has produced copper sculptures for Beverley Minster in Beverley, East Riding of Yorkshire, where she has also worked on stained glass windows.
