= Æthelburh of Barking =

7th-century Anglo-Saxon abbess

Saint Æthelburg
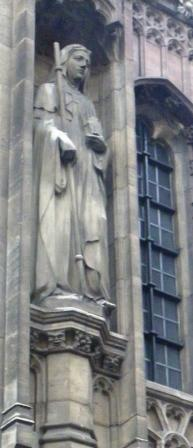
- Statue of Saint Ethelburga (Nathaniel Hitch, 1890s) at All Hallows-by-the-Tower, London

Abbess of Barking
- Died: late 7th century Barking Abbey, London, England
- Feast: 11 October

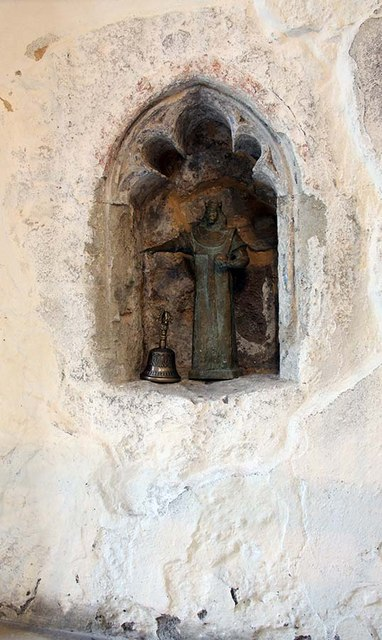
Statue of Æthelburh in St Ethelburga's Bishopsgate

Saint Æthelburh or Ethelburga (Note: In Old English, also Æðelburh, Æþelburge, Æþelburhge, and Aethelburge. Pronounced [ˈæ.ðeɫ.burˠɣ], lit. 'noble fortress'.) (d. after AD 685) was the founder and first abbess of Barking Abbey and sister of Saint Earconwald, Bishop of London.

== Life ==
The main source for Æthelburh's life is Bede's Ecclesiastical History of the English People (Book IV, Chapters 6 to 10). Bede's account, which includes the founding of Barking Abbey, early miracles there, and Æthelburh's death, is itself based on a "little book" (libellus), likely a Life of Saint Ethelburga written at Barking Abbey and now lost. Bede describes Æthelburh as "upright in life and constantly planning for the needs of her community," and says that, upon her death, "no one who knew her ought to doubt that an entrance into the heavenly country was open to her."

Some time before he became Bishop of London in 675, Æthelburh's brother Earconwald founded a double monastery at Barking for her and a monastery at Chertsey for himself. Barking Abbey's traditional founding date is 666, though Bede implies Æthelburh was already the head of the monastery during the plague of 664, and charter evidence may suggest a founding c. 660–664.

Around 675, Æthelburh founded the church of All Hallows Berkyngechirche (now known as All Hallows Barking or All Hallows by the Tower) in the City of London on land given to her by Earconwald.

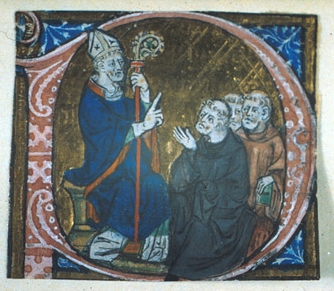
Saint Earconwald, Bishop of London, founder of Barking Abbey, and Æthelburh's brother.

In the Hodilred Charter (dated most plausibly to 685–687 or 691–693), Æthelburh was granted 40 hides of land to expand Barking Abbey. She is also the recipient of the Earconwald Charter (dated 687) of disputed authenticity.

The year of Æthelburh's death is uncertain, though she is believed to have died on 11 October. Bede does not provide a year, instead thematically positioning Æthelburh's story after the discussion of her brother Earconwald's appointment as Bishop of London in 675. He begins his narrative of events at Barking Abbey by calling back to his earlier description of the plague of 664. Florence of Worcester (1100s) mentions Æthelburh's death under 664 (Note: This date would seem unlikely since the earliest proposed year for the founding of Barking Abbey is 660 and Bede says that the nun Tortgyth, who had a premonition of Æthelburh's death, had lived at the abbey "for many years" at the time of her vision.) and again under 675, perhaps following Bede. If the Hodilred Charter is genuine, Æthelburh's death must fall after 685. If she was still alive in 693, it is possible that Earconwald died while visiting her at Barking Abbey.

Æthelburh was succeeded as abbess by Saint Hildelith, who certainly held the position by 709, (Note: Aldhelm, who died in 709, dedicated his De Virginitate to her and the other nuns of Barking Abbey.) was recruited by Earconwald to teach Æthelburh, and lived "to an extreme old age." Æthelburh was buried at Barking Abbey, likely in the nuns' cemetery. (Note: Bede says that, after Æthelburh's death, her body was "carried into the church, till it should be buried," implying her burial place was not inside the church. He also relates a miracle that occurred when a petitioner prayed before "the relics of the saints" at the abbey's cemetery.)

== Legend and relics ==
Bede recounts several miracles associated with Æthelburh and the founding of Barking Abbey. In one, during the plague of 664, Æthelburh asked where the nuns should be buried, and in response a light that "seemed to exceed the utmost brightness of daylight" came down from the heavens "like a great sheet" and illuminated the area where the cemetery should be placed. In another, Saint Tortgyth, a nun of Barking, saw a vision of a figure being drawn up to heaven by "cords brighter than gold," a premonition of Æthelburh's death a few days later. Under Abbess Hildelith, Æthelburh's relics were translated from the cemetery into the church.

Around 1087, Abbess Ælfgifu commissioned Goscelin of Saint-Bertin to write a series of works about Barking Abbey, including a Life and Miracles of St. Ethelburga. Goscelin supplements Bede's account with contemporary legends provided by Sister Wulfruna-Judith, an elderly nun at Barking Abbey. These include a miracle in which Æthelburh created a storm to threaten a priest who had stolen a book from the abbey, and another in which Æthelburh enlisted a wolf, bear, and lion to defend the abbey against a Danish raid. Much of Goscelin's focus, however, is on supporting Abbess Ælfgifu's ambitious building program. For instance, Goscelin recounts that, when Ælfgifu wished to rebuild the abbey but met resistance from Bishop Maurice, Æthelburh appeared in a vision to the abbey's steward and granted her approval. Likewise, the translation of the abbey's three patron saints (Æthelburh, Hildelith, and Wulfhilda) into the new, finished church was celebrated with many miraculous happenings.

Under the tenure of Abbess Mabel de Bosham (1215–1247), the three saints' relics were again translated, this time into the abbey's new saints' chapel. At the time of the monastery's dissolution by Henry VIII in 1539, Æthelburh's relics occupied the central position in the chapel, alongside Hildelith and Wulfhilda. A trio of modern grave slabs at Abbey Green remember the three saints.

== Legacy ==
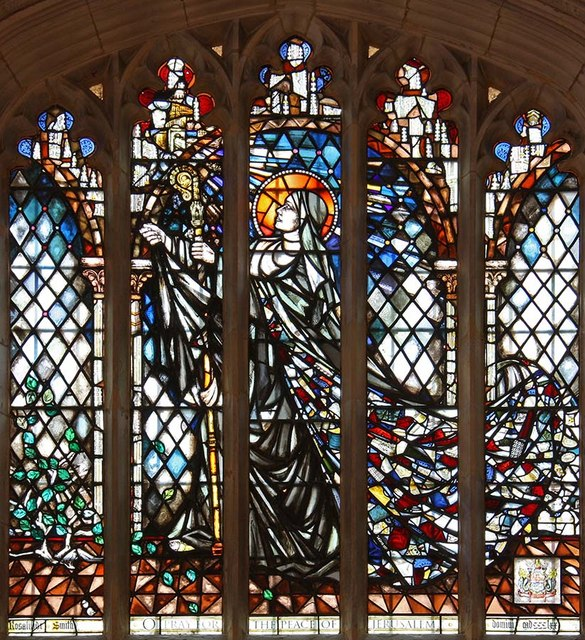
Modern stained glass window of Saint Æthelburh at St Ethelburga's Centre for Reconciliation and Peace (east window). Designed in 2002 by Helen Whittaker.

The church of St Ethelburga the Virgin in the City of London is dedicated to her. It survived the Great Fire of 1666 and the Blitz but was extensively damaged in an IRA attack in 1993; however, it has been restored and is now a centre for international reconciliation.

An area near Battersea Park and Albert Bridge was also named after her (Ethelburga Street, the Ethelburga Estate, and Ethelburga Primary School in 1968-2000).

Other churches dedicated to Æthelburh include the Grade II listed St Ethelburga's at Great Givendale, near Pocklington in the East Riding of Yorkshire, as well as the Church of St Mary and St Ethelburga with St Erconwald in Barking, a short distance from the original site of the abbey.

Æthelburh is remembered on her 11 October feast day in the Roman Catholic Church, the Church of England, and the Orthodox Church.

== See also ==
- Barking Abbey
- Earconwald
- Hildelith
- Wulfhilda
- St Ethelburga's Bishopsgate
