= Horton, Dorset =

Village in Dorset, England

Coordinates: 50.867°N 1.957°W

Horton
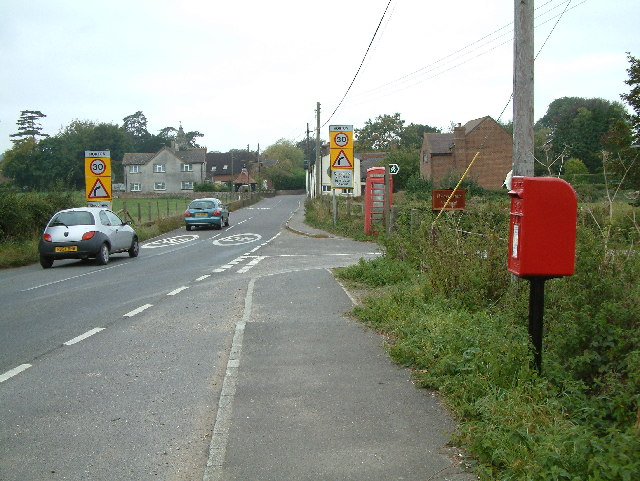
- Horton

- Location within Dorset
- OS grid reference: SU031075
- Civil parish: Horton
- Unitary authority: Dorset
- Ceremonial county: Dorset
- Region: South West
- Country: England
- Sovereign state: United Kingdom
- Post town: WIMBORNE
- Postcode district: BH21
- Dialling code: 01258
- Police: Dorset
- Fire: Dorset and Wiltshire
- Ambulance: South Western
- UK Parliament: North Dorset

Horton is a village in Dorset, England, situated on the boundary between the chalk downland of Cranborne Chase and the Dorset Heaths, and ten miles north of Poole. The village has a population of 515 (2001).

== Overview ==
The name Horton is a common one in England. It derives from Old English horu 'dirt' and tūn 'settlement, farm, estate', presumably meaning 'farm on muddy soil'. The earliest reference to the one in Dorset is in a charter of 946 ACE, albeit surviving only in a fourteenth-century copy, which mentions 'oþ hore tuninge gemære' ('to the boundary of the people of Horton').

The village has two unusual buildings: the Horton Tower, a five storey gothic red brick observatory designed by Humphrey Sturt whose principal purpose now is that of a disguised mobile phone mast for operator Vodafone, and the 18th century Georgian church of St Wolfrida, built on the site of the tenth century Horton Priory. Wolfrida was the mother of Saint Edith of Wilton.

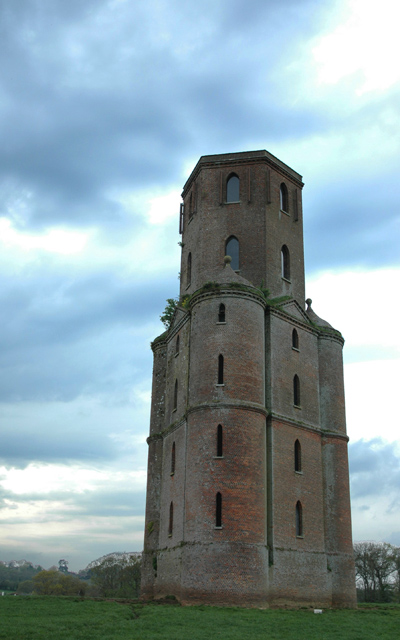
The Horton Tower, built in 1726

Horton is claimed as the location where James Scott, 1st Duke of Monmouth, was captured after the failed Monmouth Rebellion. Monmouth hid in a ditch under an ash tree disguised as a shepherd but was betrayed by a local woman who, according to legend, later killed herself in remorse.

The village once had a manor house but this was superseded by Crichel House, a nearby stately home, and the manor house decayed and was pulled down. The stables, now converted into the rectory, and a large ornamental lake, remain.

Horton church is the burial place of Sir George Hastings.

== See also ==
- Horton Priory

== Bibliography ==
- Pitt-Rivers, Michael, 1968. Dorset. London: Faber & Faber.
