= 99 Bishopsgate =

Coordinates: 51°30′57.4″N 0°4′56.71″W

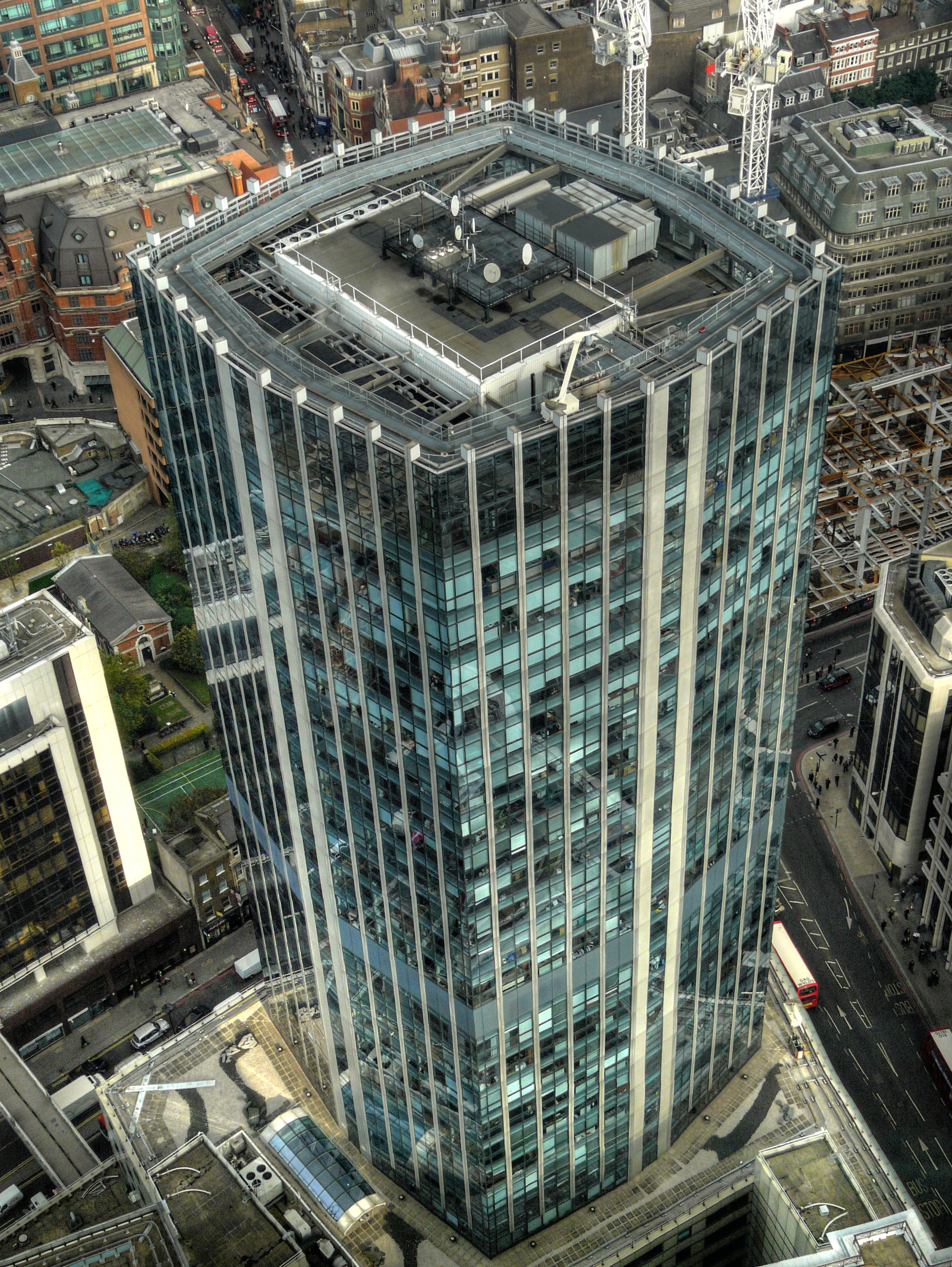
- 99 Bishopsgate viewed from its taller neighbour, Tower 42.

General information
- Type: Commercial
- Location: London, United Kingdom
- Completed: 1976; 50 years ago
- Owner: Brookfield Properties

Height
- Roof: 104 metres (341 ft)

Technical details
- Floor count: 26

Design and construction
- Architect: GMW Architects

99 Bishopsgate is a commercial skyscraper in London. It is located on Bishopsgate, a major thoroughfare in the City of London financial district. The building is 104 metres (341 ft) tall and has 25 office floors, with a total net lettable floor space of circa 30,000 square metres (322,900 sq ft). There are a further three plant floors at levels LG, 14 and 27.

The original core and steelwork was completed in 1976. At the time, it had the fastest lifts in Europe, running at up to 6.5 metres per second. The building was occupied solely by HSBC until the organisation moved to 8 Canada Square at Canary Wharf (that building subsequently became known as the HSBC Tower).

99 Bishopsgate was extensively damaged in 1993 by a truck bomb exploded by the Provisional IRA, which also damaged the neighbouring NatWest Tower.

The building was fully refurbished over a period of 14 months, which resulted in substantially improved cladding and a façade overrun which increased its overall height slightly. Larger, open plan floorplates were also created. It re-opened in mid-1995 as a multi-let office tower and is currently owned (leasehold) by Hammerson and managed by CBRE Group.

CBRE has produced an energy performance certificate (EPC) for 99 Bishopsgate which has resulted in a 'C' rating for the building. The factors that influenced the rating are the impact of specifying energy efficient plant and equipment during refits and the standard of building-related information made available for the purposes of EPC calculation. Considering the age of the building, a 'C' rating is considered impressive.

A public right of way exists through the building as part of the City of London 'highwalk' system, connecting a pedestrian bridge over London Wall to the walkways around Tower 42.

On 31 January 2025, the City of London approved plans for the construction of a new 54-storey tower at the site. Demolition of the current building is planned to commence in 2026.

== Tenants ==
- Brookfield
- Huawei Technologies
- Korea Development Bank
- MBIA
- RELX

== See also ==
- 100 Bishopsgate, a skyscraper opposite
- Heron Tower, located at 110 Bishopsgate
- List of tallest buildings and structures in London
- St Ethelburga's Bishopsgate, a church opposite
- 22 Bishopsgate, a skyscraper nearby
