= Wormwood Street =

Street in the City of London

Coordinates: 51°30′59″N 0°04′59″W

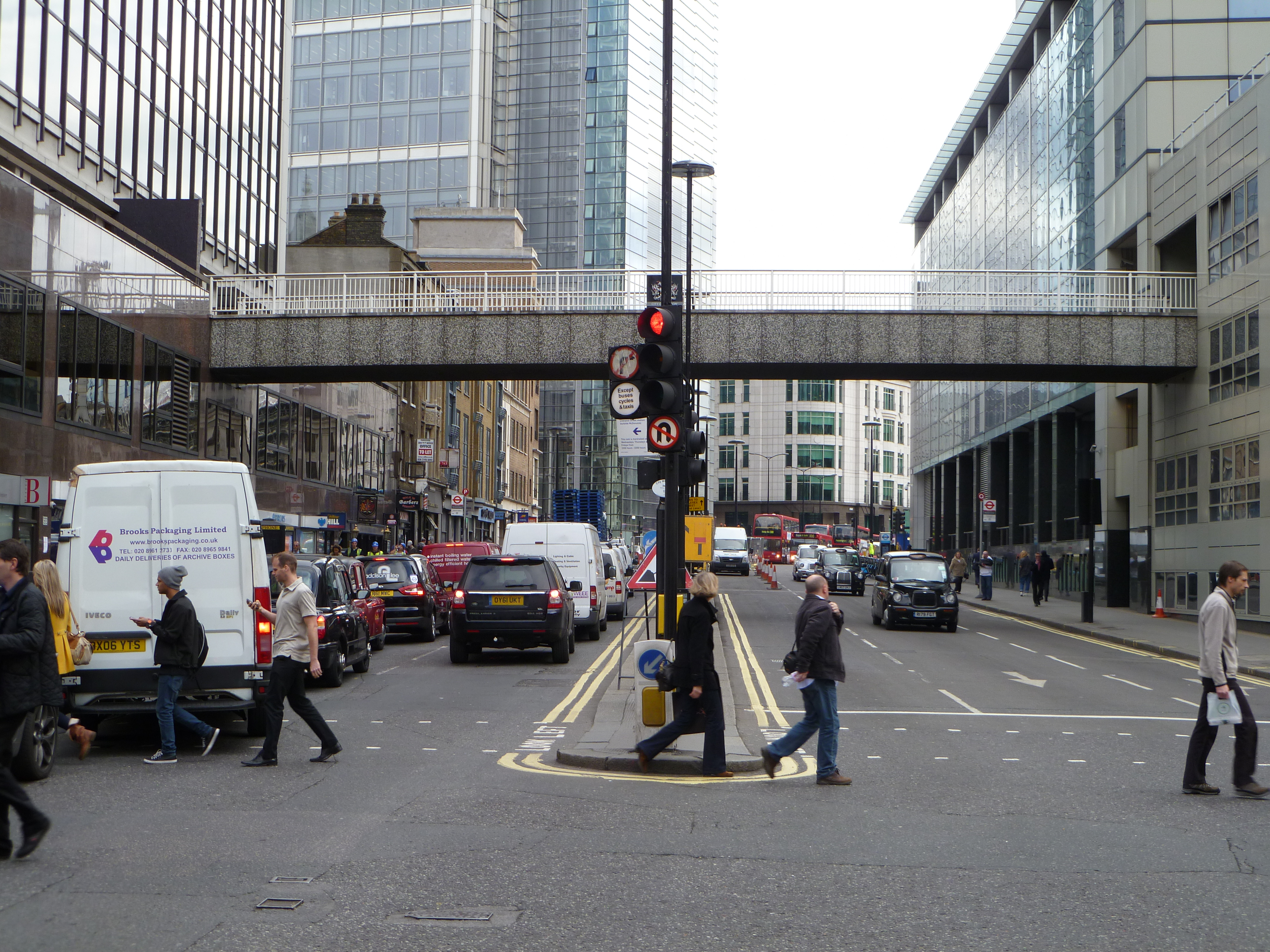
Wormwood Street pictured in 2012.

Wormwood Street is a short street in the City of London which runs between London Wall at its western end and a junction with Bishopsgate and Camomile Street in the east. It is a dual carriageway which forms part of the A1211 route between Barbican and Whitechapel.

The nearest London Underground stations to Wormwood Street are Liverpool Street and Moorgate. It is within the London congestion charge zone. The postcode for the street is EC2.

== Etymology ==
The name of the street refers to a plant called wormwood which used to grow on the London Wall and in other areas of wasteland in the City. Wormwood Street's course follows the line of a sector of the original city wall, the wall forming the rear of the buildings on the north side of the street.

== History ==
It escaped destruction in the Great Fire of 1666 but had to be extensively redeveloped after suffering severe damage in the 1993 Bishopsgate bombing. The bomb exploded on Bishopsgate near its junction with Wormwood Street.

Archaeological investigations by the Museum of London Archaeology Service undertaken during the reconstruction after the bombing discovered a coin in the remains of London Wall that led to the date of construction to be reappraised to preceding the year 180.

== See also ==
Nearby streets:

- Bevis Marks
- Houndsditch
- St. Mary Axe
