= William Geikie-Cobb =

Anglican priest

William Frederick Geikie-Cobb (born Danbury 1857 – died London 1941) was an Anglican priest and author, most notable for his willingness to remarry divorced people in church.

Geikie-Cobb was educated at King Edward VI Grammar School, Chelmsford and Trinity College, Dublin and ordained in 1883. He served curacies at Send, Addlestone, Winchester and Kentish Town. He was rector of St Ethelburga's Bishopsgate from 1900 until his death. During his tenure he was able to officiate at the remarriage of many divorced people, partly because the then Bishop of London had increasingly lost control of discipline within the diocese.

He died on 14 December 1941.
