= Sir Paul Pindar =

English merchant and diplomat (1565–1650)

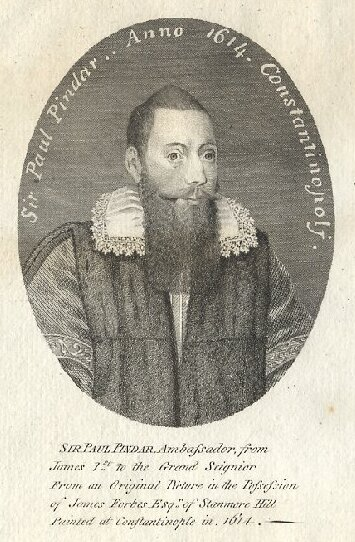
Sir Paul Pindar

Sir Paul Pindar (1565–1650) was a merchant and, from 1611 to 1620, was Ambassador of King James I of England to the Ottoman Empire.

== Biography ==
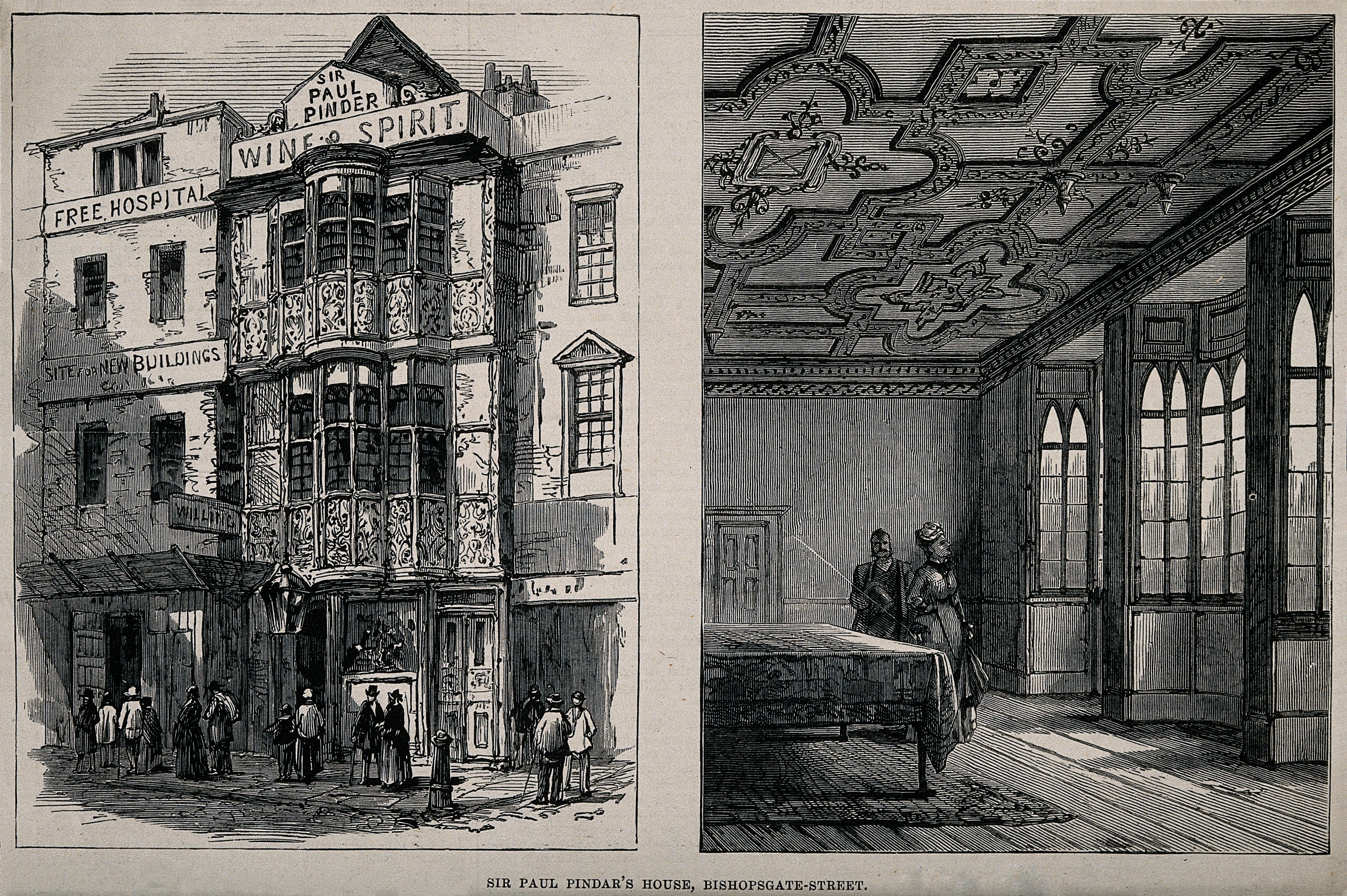
Pindar's Bishopsgate house

Born in Wellingborough and educated at Wellingborough School Pindar entered trade as the apprentice to an Italian merchant in London. He later became involved when he received Company Articles to the Ottoman Empire on 27 September 1611. As secretary to the English ambassador in Constantinople he arrived in December 1611, eventually becoming ambassador himself. Pindar was present when the famous gift of an organ was made to the royal household by Ambassador Lello and he went on to become a favourite of Safiye Sultan, the powerful mother of Sultan Mehmed III.

As ambassador he was "renowned for his generosity in educating young men at his own 'care and cost'" He was recalled on 25 January 1618 but did not leave until May 1620. Pindar was knighted by James I in 1623.

A pamphlet published in London in 1642 states that Pindar saved the life of a felon named "Running Jack" who had been sentenced to death. The prisoner "was found to have been such a notorious Malefactor, that the Bench did condemn him to dy: but hee hath since obtained a Reprieve by the means of Sir Paul Pindar." The pamphlet does not elaborate on his crimes, or on why Sir Paul had an interest in the case.

In 1644, Pindar provided 1,705 lbs (775 kg) of gold, via Jane Whorwood, to smuggle the Queen and the Prince of Wales to France.

== Legacy ==
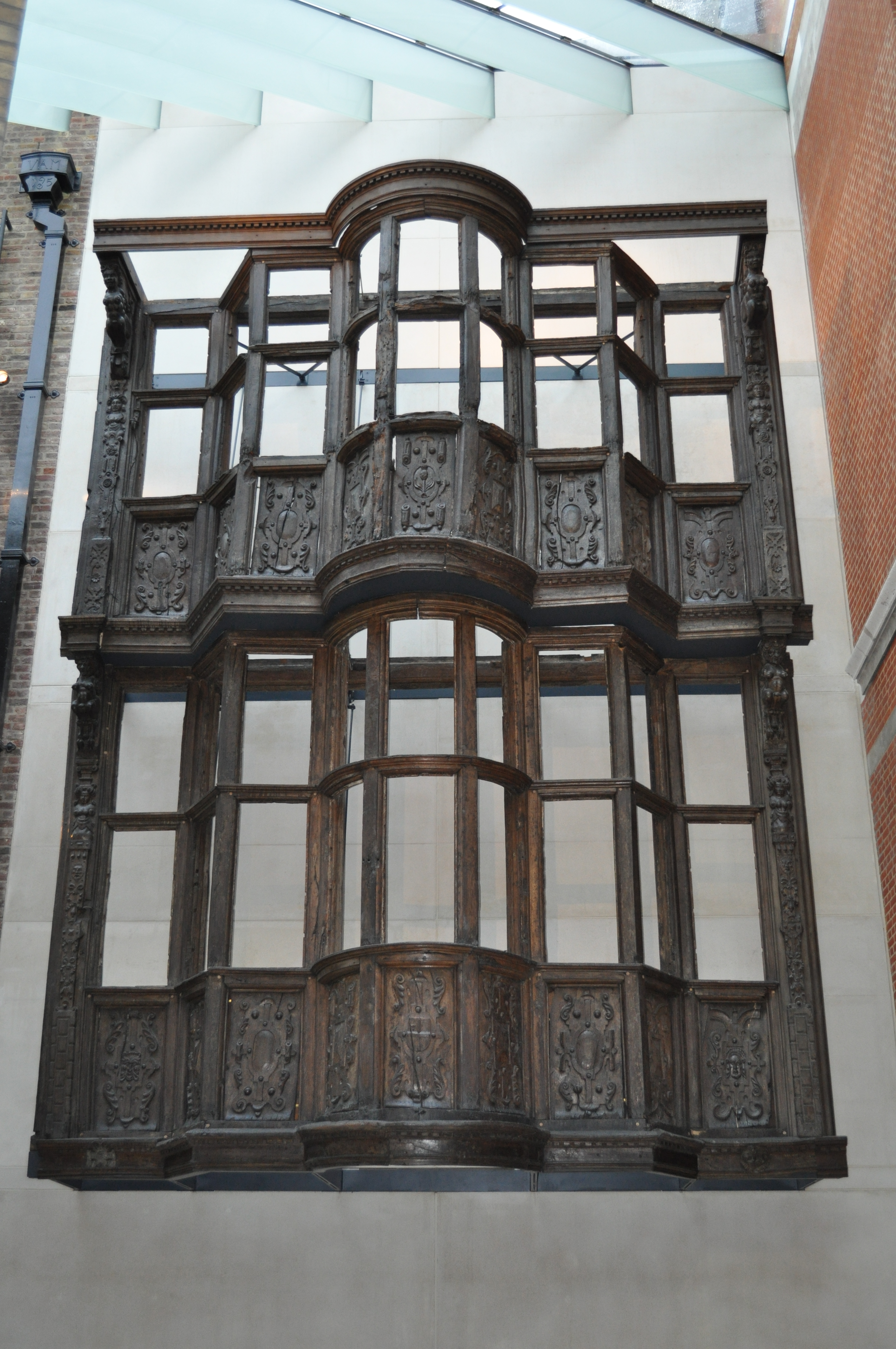
A jettied portion of the façade of Pindar's house is preserved in the Victoria and Albert Museum.

In the 18th century Sir Paul Pindar's House in Bishopsgate became a tavern called the "Sir Paul Pindar's Head". It was demolished in 1890 to make way for the expansion of Liverpool Street station. Its façade was preserved and can now be seen in the Daylit Gallery of the Victoria and Albert Museum.

There is a commemorative vase to Pindar in St Botolph's Church, Bishopsgate.
