= Hildelith =

English Christian saint

Saint Hildelith

Abbess
- Died: ~716
- Feast: 22 December (Martyrologium Anglicanum), 24 March.

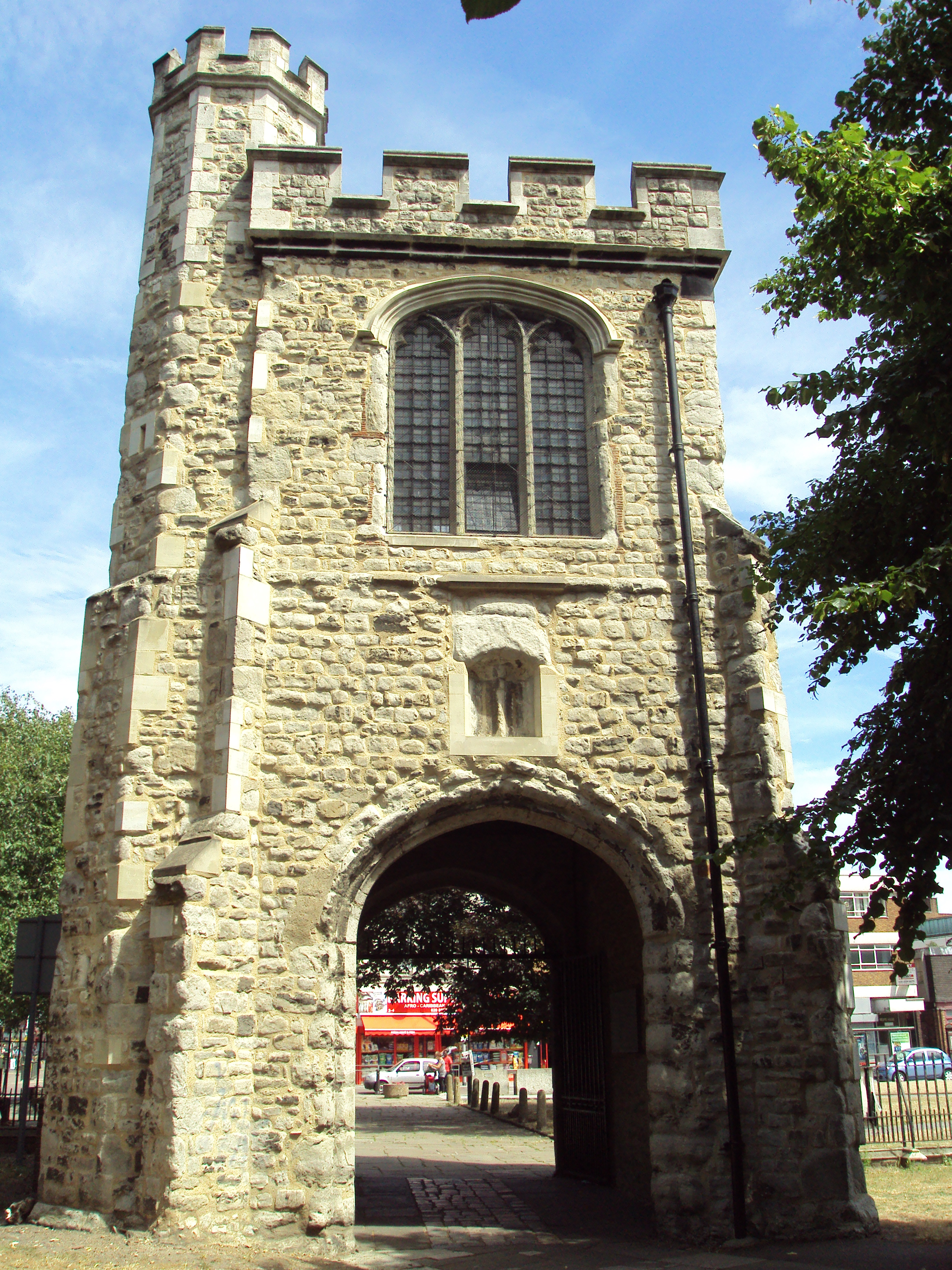
Ruins of Barking Abbey

Hildelith of Barking, also known as Hildilid or Hildelitha, was an 8th-century Christian saint, from Anglo-Saxon England but was of foreign origin.

Very little is known of her life; however, she is known to history mainly through the hagiography of the Secgan Manuscript, and the Life of St Hildelith written in 1087 by the Medieval Benedictine hagiographical writer Goscelin. She was abbess of the nunnery at Barking in England. She was also the superior to Cwenburh of Wimborne prior to that saint's founding of Wimborne Abbey.

== Abbess of Barking ==
Earconwald is said to have engaged Hildelith to instruct his sister Æthelburh, abbess of the monastery which he had founded at Barking. Hildilid succeeded her pupil as the abbess at some date later than 692, if we accept the charter of Æthelred to Æthelburga given under that date (Kemble, Codex Dipl. i. 39). According to another account it must have been after the death of Earconwald (693), who died on a visit to his sister. Florence of Worcester, however, gives her accession under 664, but again mentions it under 675 (i. 27, 33).

Bede speaks of Hildelith's long rule, of her translation of the bones of saints into the church of St. Mary and of a miraculous cure of a blind man which took place in her time.

It is not known who replaced her as the next known abbess is Wulfhild (c940-1000), three centuries later and just prior to the Norman Invasion. She was unique in that under her control the abbey acted as a double monastery.

== Death and burial ==
The date of Hildilid's death is uncertain, but Bede speaks of her long rule and says she lived to a great age and historian Katie Bugyis states that Hildelith died sometime after 686. A letter dated to 716 from Saint Boniface to Eadburga, Abbess of Minster mentions Hildilid as the original source for his Vision of the Monk of Wenlock, but he does not indicate whether she was at the time still living or dead. She was abbess until about 700 AD and she may have died about 725 AD, being buried in Barking. On the other hand, an excavation of Hartlepool Abbey in 1833 found human burials and Anglo-Saxon artefacts, several of which, in consultation with the British Archaeological Association, were identified, including Hildelith, along with two other nuns of Barking Abbey, Eadgyd and Torchtgyd. However, this later 'identification' has been more recently discredited by Tees Archaeology, who hold the Historic Environment Records for all known archaeological sites in Hartlepool and Stockton-on-Tees. See the Corpus Record of Anglo Saxon Stone Sculpture for further details.
