= Wulfhilda of Barking =

Anglo-Saxon abbess and Catholic saint

Wulfhilda, also known as Wulfhild and Wulfreda among several other names (c. 940 – c. 996), was an Anglo-Saxon abbess who is venerated as a saint in the Catholic Church.

== Life ==
Wulfhilda was the daughter of a Wessex nobleman named Wulfhelm. She was raised and educated by the Benedictine nuns of Wilton Abbey and joined their community upon coming of age. Around 970, she was appointed as abbess of Barking Abbey by King Edgar, most likely to "repent of his lustful pursuit of her". Under Wulfhilda's leadership, the monastery flourished and greatly expanded. Wulfhilda herself donated 20 villages to the abbey and established another monastery at Horton in Kent.

According to Goscelin of Saint-Bertin, the nuns at Barking laid complaints against their abbess Wulfhilda, and the English queen Ælfthryth deposed her, only to reinstate her twenty years later. The demotion might have been the result of jealousy as Ælfthryth's husband Edgar may have had a romantic interest in Wulfhilda. Wulfhilda remained, assisted by a group of sisters at Barking, in exile at Horton Priory for 20 years. She returned after Ælfthryth "had driven Barking to near financial ruin" and after the community received a vision from their founder Saint Æthelburh directing them to allow Wulfhilda to return.

Goscelin also described Wulfhilda's service to her followers, which he compared to the qualities of a humble, attentive, and nurturing mother and included "drawing water, gathering wood, kindling fires, preparing provisions, distributing clothes, and bathing her sisters", which he called her ministry. Goscelin praised her hands in his description of her regular and secret practice of sitting before the abbey church's doors and distributing alms to the poor as they passed by. He also praised her protégée and successor, Leofflǽd, for following Wulfhilda's teachings and example of compassion. He dedicated his vita of Wulfhilda to Bishop Maurice of London, Barking Abbey's diocesan at the time, and appealed to him to defend and accept the nuns who kept her memory alive, citing the role of women's testimony throughout the history of the Christian Church.

She died c. 996 and was buried at the abbey with two other saints, Hildelith and Ethelberga. According to Goscelin, her veneration was widespread and long-lasting.
