= 100 Bishopsgate =

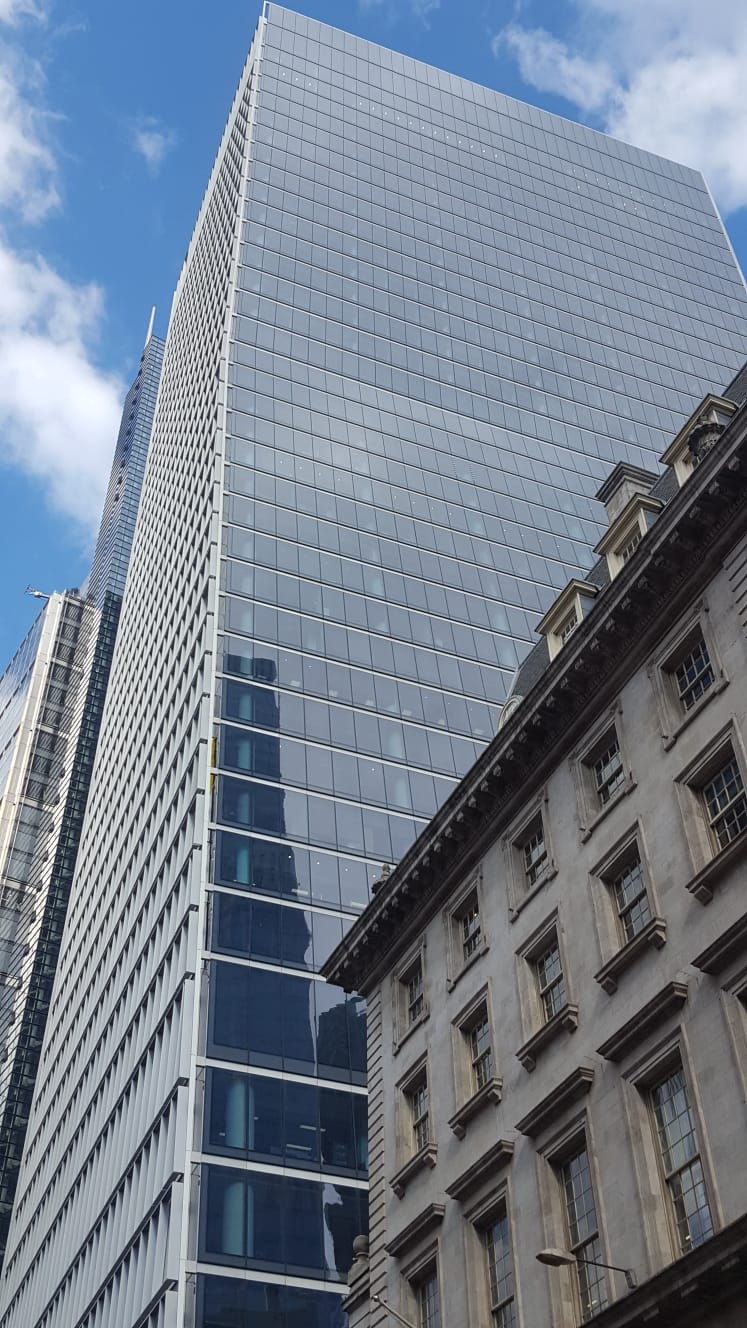
- 100 Bishopsgate in April 2021
- Interactive map of the 100 Bishopsgate area

General information
- Status: Completed
- Location: London, England
- Coordinates: 51.5158°N 0.0810°W
- Construction started: 2015
- Completed: 2019
- Client: Brookfield Properties

Height
- Architectural: 172 metres (564 ft)

Technical details
- Floor count: 40
- Floor area: 73,000 square metres (785,800 ft^{2})
- Lifts/elevators: 24

Design and construction
- Architect: Allies & Morrison Arney Fender Katsalidis
- Structural engineer: Robert Bird Group
- Main contractor: Brookfield Multiplex

100 Bishopsgate consists of two mixed-use buildings in central London. The buildings are situated on the eastern edge of the City of London financial district.

Building 1 on the site is a 40-storey tower comprising five floors of 44,000 ft^{2} (4,100 m^{2}) each and 32 office floors of between 19,000–25,000 ft^{2} (1,800–2,300 m^{2}). Building 2 is a seven-storey structure that was developed behind a retained façade, and houses restaurant and office floors of 8,000 ft^{2} (740 m^{2}) each.

The developer was The 100 Bishopsgate Partnership, a joint-venture between Brookfield Office Properties (87.5%) and Great Portland Estates (12.5%).

== Site history ==
Along Bishopsgate, the 100 Bishopsgate site spans between St Ethelburga's Church and Camomile Street, with Clerks Lane (or Clarks Lane) separating two portions. In 1993 the IRA exploded a large bomb in Bishopsgate, seven metres from St Ethelburga's Church. A number of surrounding buildings were badly damaged. A new building on the site was constructed, numbered 58, which included a public house, the Magpie and Punch Bowl which had operated at that location since 1839. The site was again renumbered to 86 Bishopsgate, and included a new public house, City House. Subsequently, the buildings between St Ethelburga's and Camomile Street were demolished to make way for 100 Bishopsgate.

== Planning and design ==
A planning application was submitted by Great Portland Estates in September 2006 for the redevelopment of a site located at 61 St Mary Axe, 80-86 Bishopsgate, 88-90 Bishopsgate, 12-20 Camomile Street, 15-16 St Helen's Place and 33-35 St Mary Axe. The scheme proposed a mixed-used development comprising two buildings of forty and seven storeys respectively.

The main tower (Building 1) would be formed of five podium floors, each of 44,000 ft^{2} (4,100 m^{2}; 0.41 ha), and 32 tower floors, each of 19,000–25,000 ft^{2} (1,800–2,300 m^{2}; 0.18–0.23 ha). The form of the lower part of the tower was designed to resolve the complex geometries of the site; thus the lower floors are shaped as parallelograms and the upper floors are shaped as rectangles.

The secondary building (Building 2) would be formed of seven storeys of 8,000 ft^{2} (740 m^{2}) each, providing restaurant and office space.

A new public space of 0.5 acres (2,000 m^{2}) is situated in the middle of the site.

The application was approved on 28 May 2008. In July 2011 the proposed height was increased by seven metres (23 ft) to 172 metres (564 ft).

== Construction ==
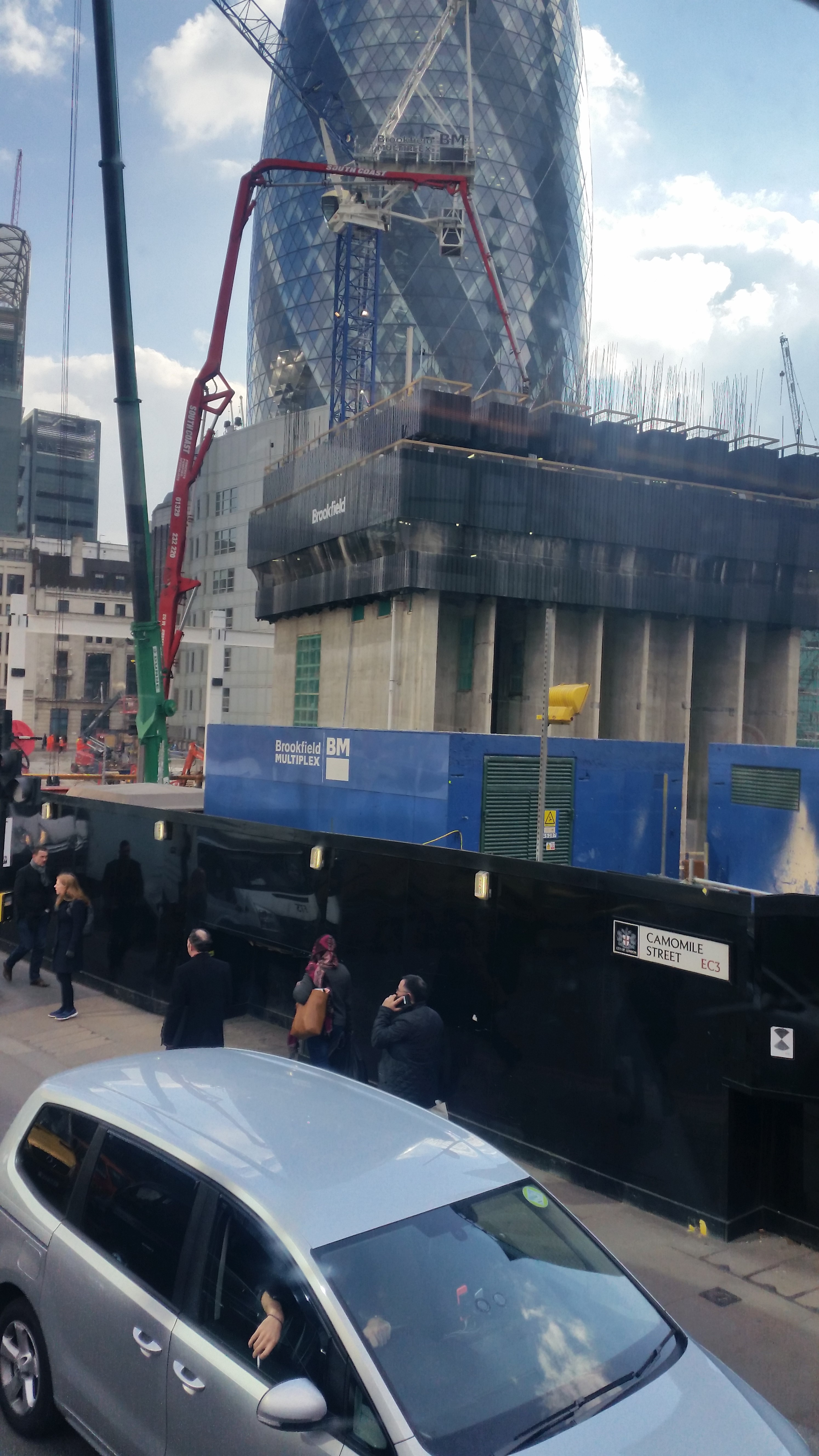
Progress as of February 2016

Demolition of the buildings and infrastructure formerly on the site commenced in May 2011 and was completed later that year. The demolition work was complicated by the existence of six power substations on the site which needed to be kept operational until they could be bypassed.

In May 2015, it was reported that building company T Clarke had agreed a revised contract for 100 Bishopsgate, with on-site activities scheduled to start in April 2016. Ground engineering work began on the foundations to prepare the project for construction.

== Ownership and tenants ==
The developer is The 100 Bishopsgate Partnership, a joint-venture between Brookfield Office Properties (87.5%) and Great Portland Estates (12.5%).

In April 2010 Brookfield paid £43m for a 50% stake in the project. In October 2012 Great Portland Estates sold 37.5% of its 50% interest to Brookfield for £47.2 million leaving it with a 12.5% interest.

In November 2015 Brookfield announced that they had let the first seven floors (250,000 ft^{2}) to the Royal Bank of Canada.

== See also ==
- City of London § Landmarks
- List of tallest buildings and structures in London
