= Horton Priory =

Benedictine priory in Dorset, England

Coordinates: 50.866545°N 1.958522°W

Horton Priory was a priory at Horton in Dorset, England.

It was founded as a Benedictine abbey around 970 by Ordgar, Earl of Devon, or his son, Ordulph, and dedicated to Saint Olfrida, Wilfrida or Wulfthryth, the mother of Saint Edith of Wilton by King Edgar the Peaceful. In the early twelfth century it was reduced to priory status by Roger, bishop of Salisbury and made dependent on Sherborne Abbey.

At the Dissolution in 1539 Sherborne Abbey was surrendered to the king, and in 1547 it was granted to Edward Seymour, 1st Duke of Somerset. On Somerset's attainder it was granted to William Herbert, 1st Earl of Pembroke. The present Horton parish church, St. Wolfrida, was built on the site of the priory in the 18th century. No traces of the original priory remain.

== Known Priors ==
- * Hugh, occurs 1286
- * John de Bradeford, occurs 1348.
- * John Cosyn, occurs 1401.
- * Henry Trew, occurs 1459–60
- * John Dorchester, occurs 1504
- * John Hart or Herte alias Raynold, occurs on its surrender, 1539.
