= Camomile Street =

Street in the City of London, England

Coordinates: 51°30′56″N 0°04′50″W

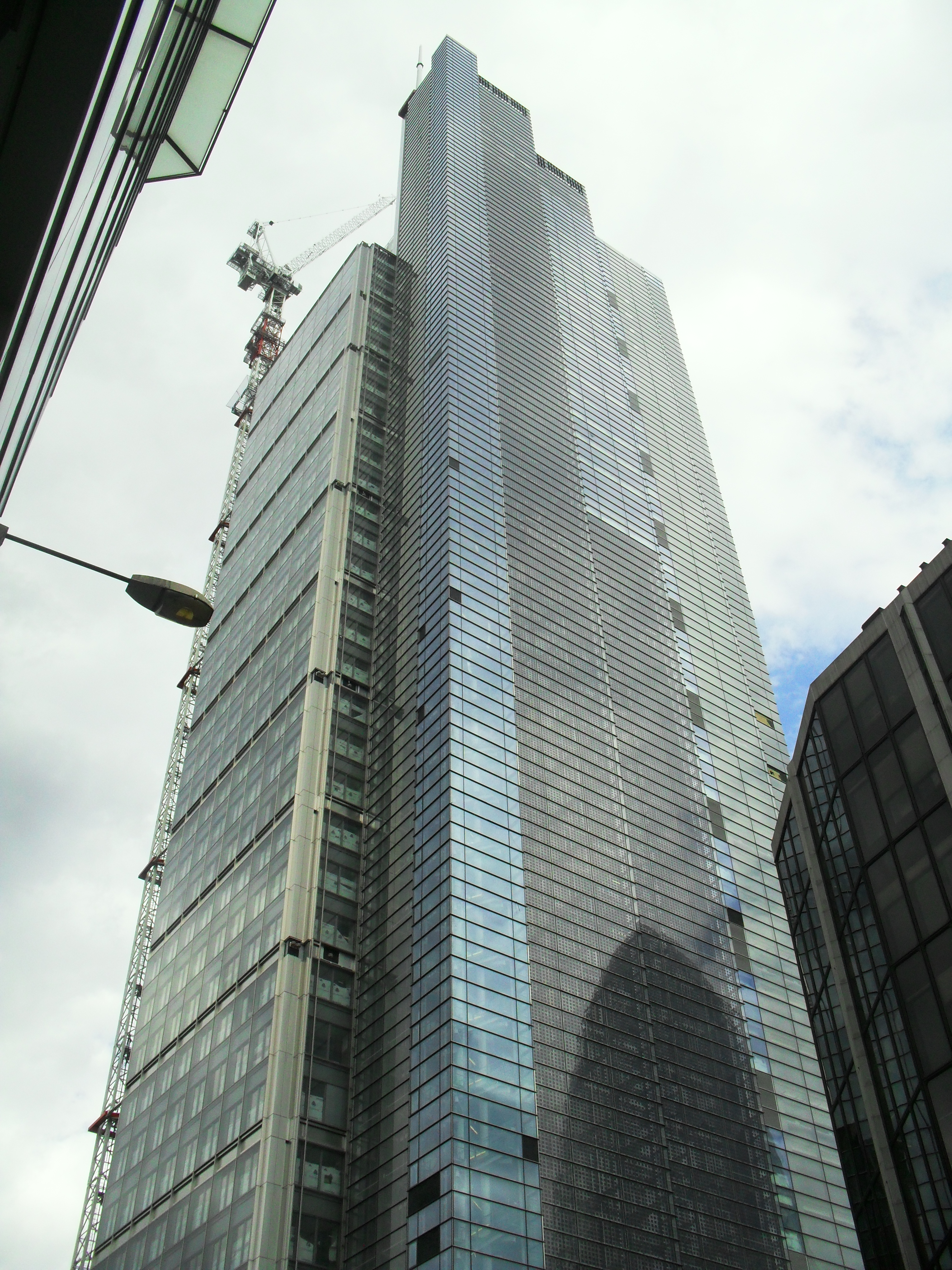
The Heron Tower is at the corner of Camomile Street and Bishopsgate

Camomile Street is a short street in the City of London, the financial and historic centre of London.

== Description ==
It is a westward continuation of Bevis Marks, linking that street to Houndsditch (via Outwich Street) and a junction with Bishopsgate and Wormwood Street.

The houses on the north side are on the site of the old Wall of London, and in excavations made for the foundations of warehouses in the street, a bastion and other portions of the wall have been found, partly of Roman construction. A tablet on the house at the north-east corner of the street marks the former site of Bishopsgate.

== History ==
There is no indication as to the origin of the name, and the street seems to have been unnamed in Stow's time. It suggests that the land immediately within the wall was waste and unbuilt on, and was covered with chamomile, which springs up so readily on all unoccupied land to this day.

On the corner of Camomile Street and Bishopsgate is the Heron Tower, a skyscraper completed in 2011 which is the tallest in the City of London and third-tallest in Greater London after the Shard and One Canada Square at Canary Wharf.

In 2022, a relatively high-profile stabbing occurred on Camomile Street in which three people were stabbed after resisted a so-called 'phone snatch' robbery.
