= St Ethelburga's Bishopsgate =

Coordinates: 51°30′55.89″N 0°4′55.63″W

- Guild Church of Saint Ethelburga the Virgin within Bishopsgate
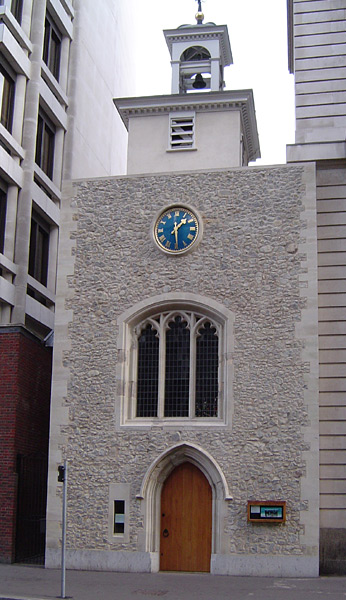
- Current church building

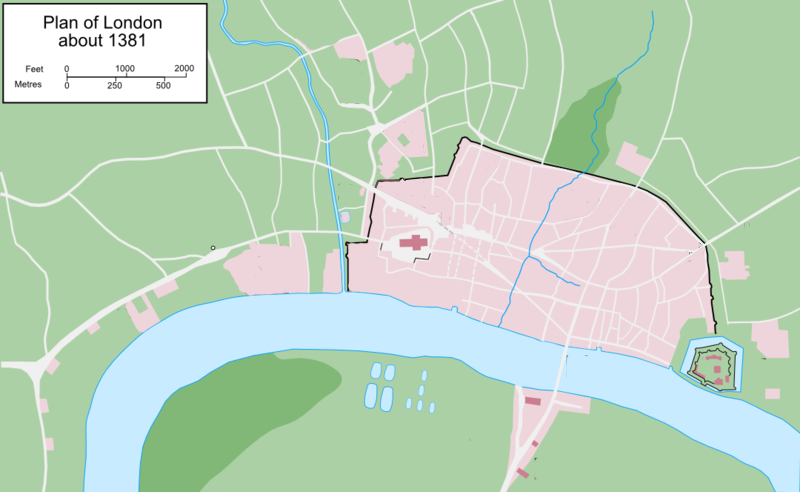
- Location within City of London Location within City of London in 1300
- OS grid reference: TQ 33185 81361
- Location: 78 Bishopsgate, London, EC2
- Country: England
- Language: English
- Denomination: Church of England
- Previous denomination: Roman Catholic (to 1534)
- Website: stethelburgas.org

History
- Status: Inactive, used as a Centre for Reconciliation and Peace
- Founded: Before 1250
- Dedication: Æthelburh of Barking

Architecture
- Heritage designation: Grade I listed building
- Style: Early English Gothic (Pointed)

Administration
- Diocese: London
- Parish: St Helen's Bishopsgate

St Ethelburga-the-Virgin within Bishopsgate is a Church of England church in the City of London, located on Bishopsgate near Liverpool Street station.

One of the few surviving medieval City churches in London, the foundation date of the church is unknown, but it was first recorded in 1250 as the church of St Adelburga the Virgin.

The church was rebuilt around 1411 and some of this material remains, notably in the south arcade.

The church was severely damaged by an IRA bomb in 1993. Following rebuilding and restoration it re-opened as a Centre for Reconciliation and Peace.

== History ==
This structure is a rare survivor of the medieval City churches that were mostly destroyed during the Great Fire of London in 1666. It is dedicated to St Ethelburga (Æthelburh), a 7th-century abbess of Barking Abbey; she was the sister of Saint Erkenwald, a Bishop of London. Its foundation date is unknown, but it was first recorded in 1250 as the church of St Adelburga-the-Virgin. The dedication to "-the-Virgin" was dropped in Puritan times but was later restored.

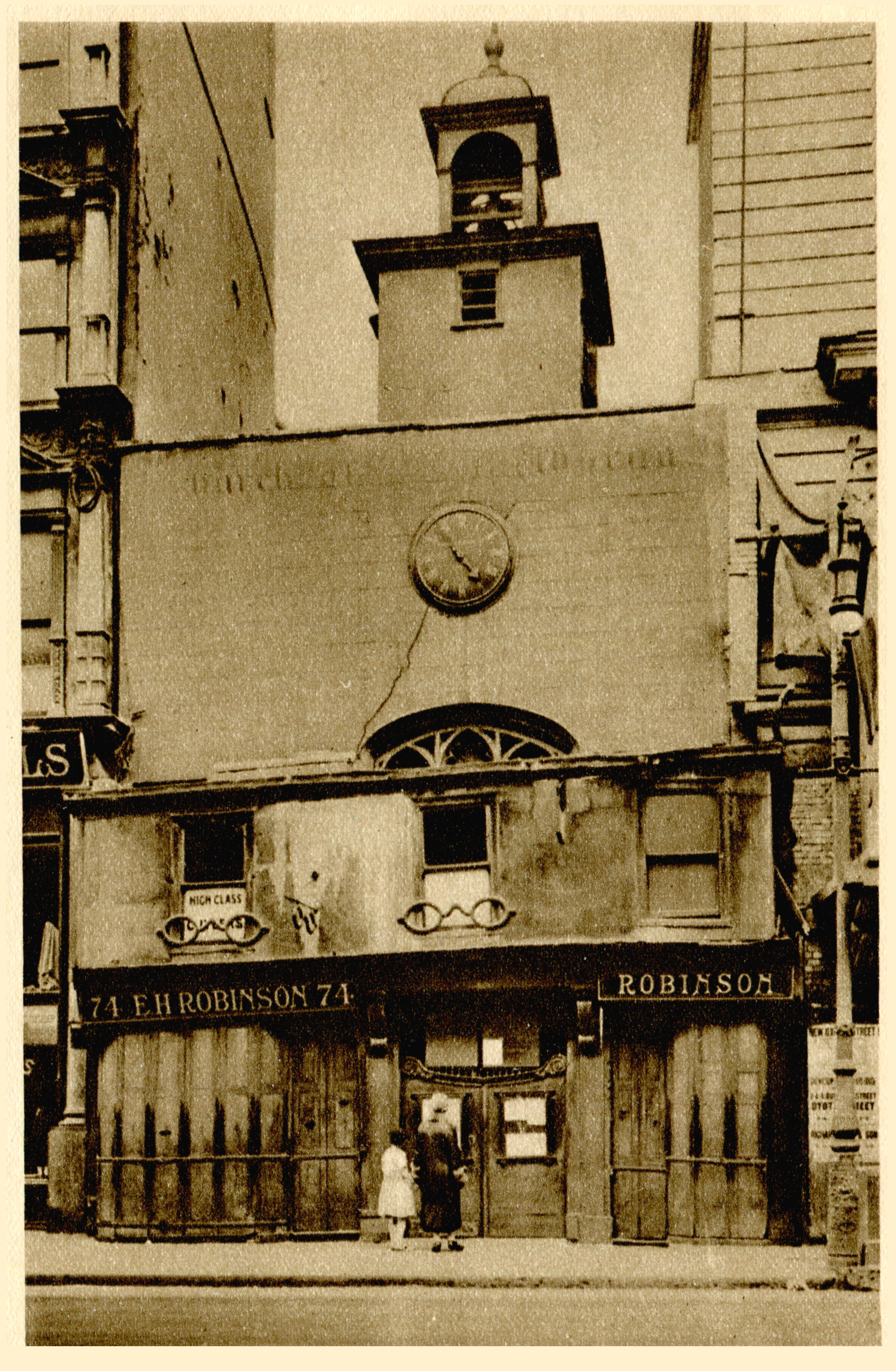
St Ethelburga's in 1927, with shopfronts

The church was rebuilt in the 15th century – possibly around 1411 – and a small square bell turret was added in 1775. A weathervane was added in 1671. In order to raise revenue for the church, whose parish covered just three acres (1.2 ha), a wooden porch was built over its exterior in the 16th century to house two shops. It underwent major changes in 1932, when Bishopsgate was controversially widened. The shops were demolished and the porch dismantled, revealing the façade of the church for the first time in centuries.

It suffered modest bomb damage during the Blitz of the Second World War and was restored in 1953. In 1993, the church was half destroyed when a massive IRA bomb exploded 7 metres from the church, devastating Bishopsgate and causing an estimated £350 million worth of damage. An evangelical faction of the Church of England proposed to demolish St Ethelburga's in the aftermath but, following a sustained public outcry, it was rebuilt to its original plan, though much changed inside.

== Description ==
The church's tiny interior comprises a nave and aisle divided by an arcade. Most of the original fittings were destroyed by the 1993 bombing although they were not as old as the church. Dating from the early 20th century, they were the work of Ninian Comper. One of the more notable surviving elements is the curious 19th-century font, which is inscribed with the palindromic inscription, written in Greek: ΝΙΨΟΝ ΑΝΟΜΗΜΑΤΑ ΜΗ ΜΟΝΑΝ ΟΨΙΝ, which translates as "Cleanse [your] transgressions, not only [your] face".

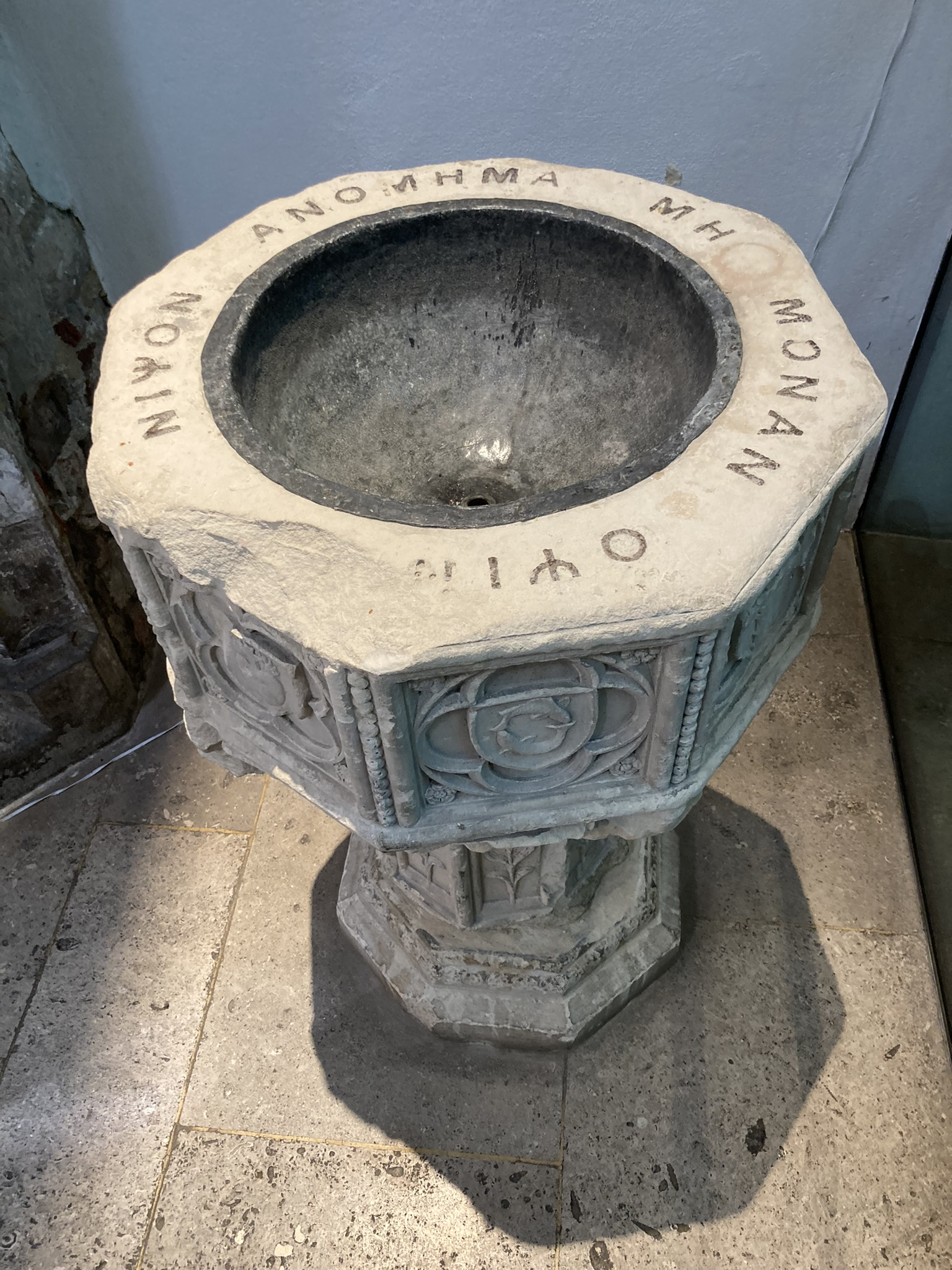
The surviving font, inscribed with its palindrome.

The church was designated a Grade I listed building on 4 January 1950, and its reconstruction retains the listing.

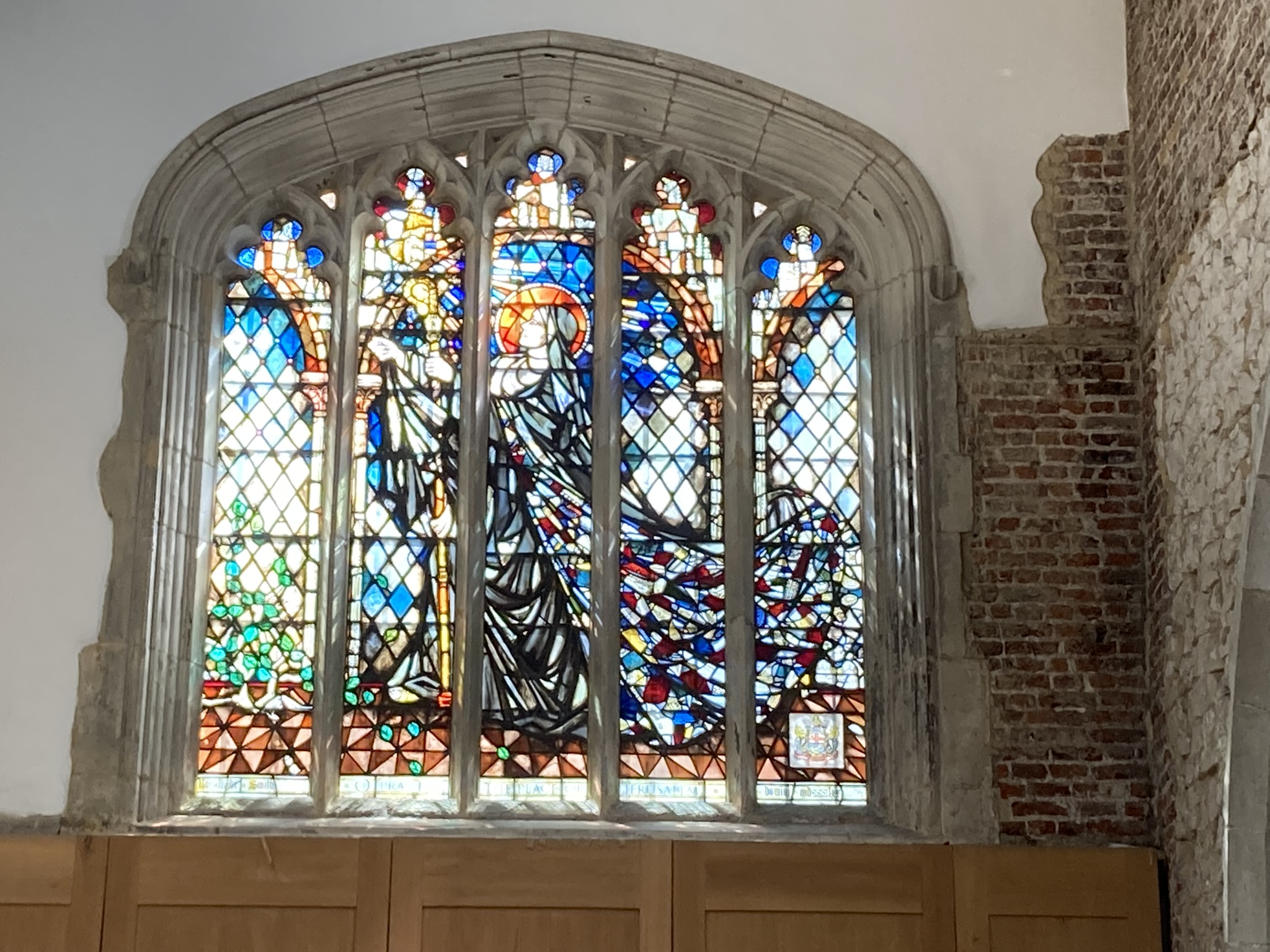
Contemporary stained glass window that incorporates surviving pieces of glazing.

== Centre for Reconciliation and Peace ==
St Ethelburga's Centre for Reconciliation and Peace is a non-profit charity which aims to build relationships across divisions of conflict, culture and religion. Its work includes: a multi-faith conflict resilience programme (faith leaders working together to become more intelligent in their responses to conflict); community reconciliation (building a coalition for peace within the North and South Sudanese diaspora in London); the Narrative Practitioners Forum (promoting the use of narrative and personal story for building empathy between people with different backgrounds); Re-awakening the Sacred (a secular and spiritual multi-disciplinary enquiry into bringing a deeper sense of meaning into the earth, environment, leadership, economics and business etc.); an MA in reconciliation at Winchester University; and several strands of cultural exchange work mentoring young adults into social action leadership roles.

It also runs a certificated three-day course in conflict coaching aimed at anyone dealing with workplace or personal conflict.

The centre also works with a social enterprise, Seasoned Events, for building/venue hire purposes.

Every year the Centre organises a 10km walk, 'The Ethelburga Walk', which links two historic sites associated with the St Ethelburga of Barking: Barking Abbey and St Ethelburga's Centre.

St Ethelburga's is a partner in the community of the Cross of Nails.

== Notable people associated with the church ==
- Blessed John Larke, Rector (1504–1544) who was martyred for denying the royal supremacy in spiritual matters.
- Henry Hudson, explorer, took communion with his crew before setting out in search of the Northwest Passage, 1607.
- Charles Viner (1678-1756) married in the church in 1699.
- John Medows Rodwell, Rector (1843–1900) who made the first reliable rendering of the Qur'an into English (1861).
- William Geikie-Cobb, Rector (1900–1941) who achieved notoriety by marrying many divorced persons in the church.
- Singers Webster Booth and Anne Ziegler (born Irené Frances Eastwood) had their marriage blessed by W. F. Geikie-Cobb in a special ceremony for divorced persons on 5 November 1938.

== See also ==
- 100 Bishopsgate - building next to St Ethelburga's
- List of churches and cathedrals of London
