= St Alphage House =

Coordinates: 51.51800°N 0.09181°W

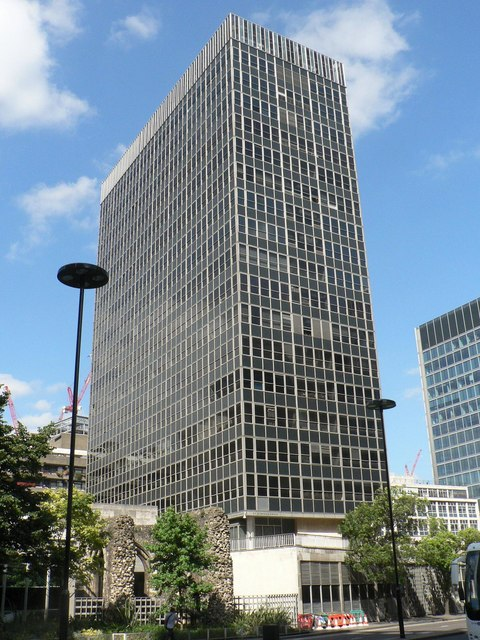
- St Alphage House in 2008
- Interactive map of the St Alphage House area

General information
- Status: Demolished
- Type: skyscraper
- Architectural style: international
- Location: Fore Street
- Completed: 1962
- Demolished: 2014

Height
- Height: 68.5 m (225 ft)

Technical details
- Structural system: curtain wall
- Floor count: 17

Design and construction
- Architecture firm: Maurice Sanders Associates
- Main contractor: Maurice Wingate

St Alphage House was a 1960s office block on Fore Street in the City of London. It was built by the developer Maurice Wingate to a design by Maurice Sanders Associates. It was named after Saint Alphege and the church of St Alphage London Wall, whose ruins stand below where the building stood. It was built as part of the redevelopment of London Wall, and was one of a series of similar blocks built between 1957 and 1976.

In 2009, it was announced that the building was to be "stripped out" by the City of London Corporation for tax reasons.

The site was proposed for redevelopment on numerous occasions and was eventually demolished from 2013 onwards.

St Alphage Garden is nearby.
