= Nebet (disambiguation) =

Nebet was a vizier during the late Old Kingdom of Egypt by Pharaoh Pepi I of the Sixth dynasty.

Nebet may also refer to:

- Nebet (queen), Egyptian Queen, the wife of King Unas
- Nebet-Het, a goddess in ancient Egyptian religion
- Nebet Tepe, a hill of Plovdiv
