= Saint Alphage =

Saint Alphage may refer to:

- "St Alphage", the parish church of Burnt Oak in northwest London, England
- St Alphage London Wall, the remains of a church originally built in 1532 adjacent to a remaining section of the London Wall
- Alphege (954–1012), (sometimes spelled as "Alphage" or Ælfheah) Archbishop of Canterbury
