= Nebet Tepe =

Prehistoric settlement in Plovdiv, Bulgaria

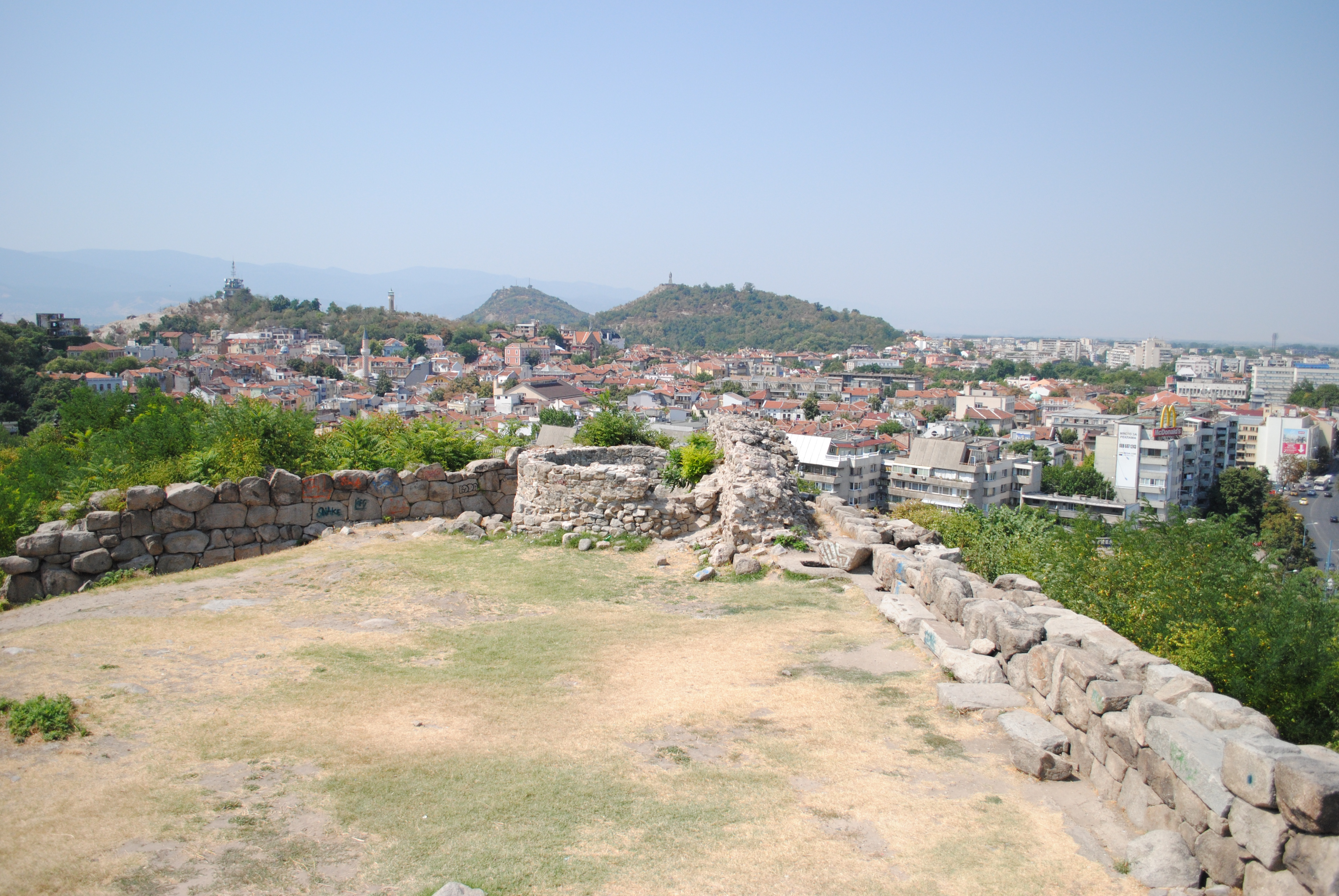
- View from the top of Nebet Tepe

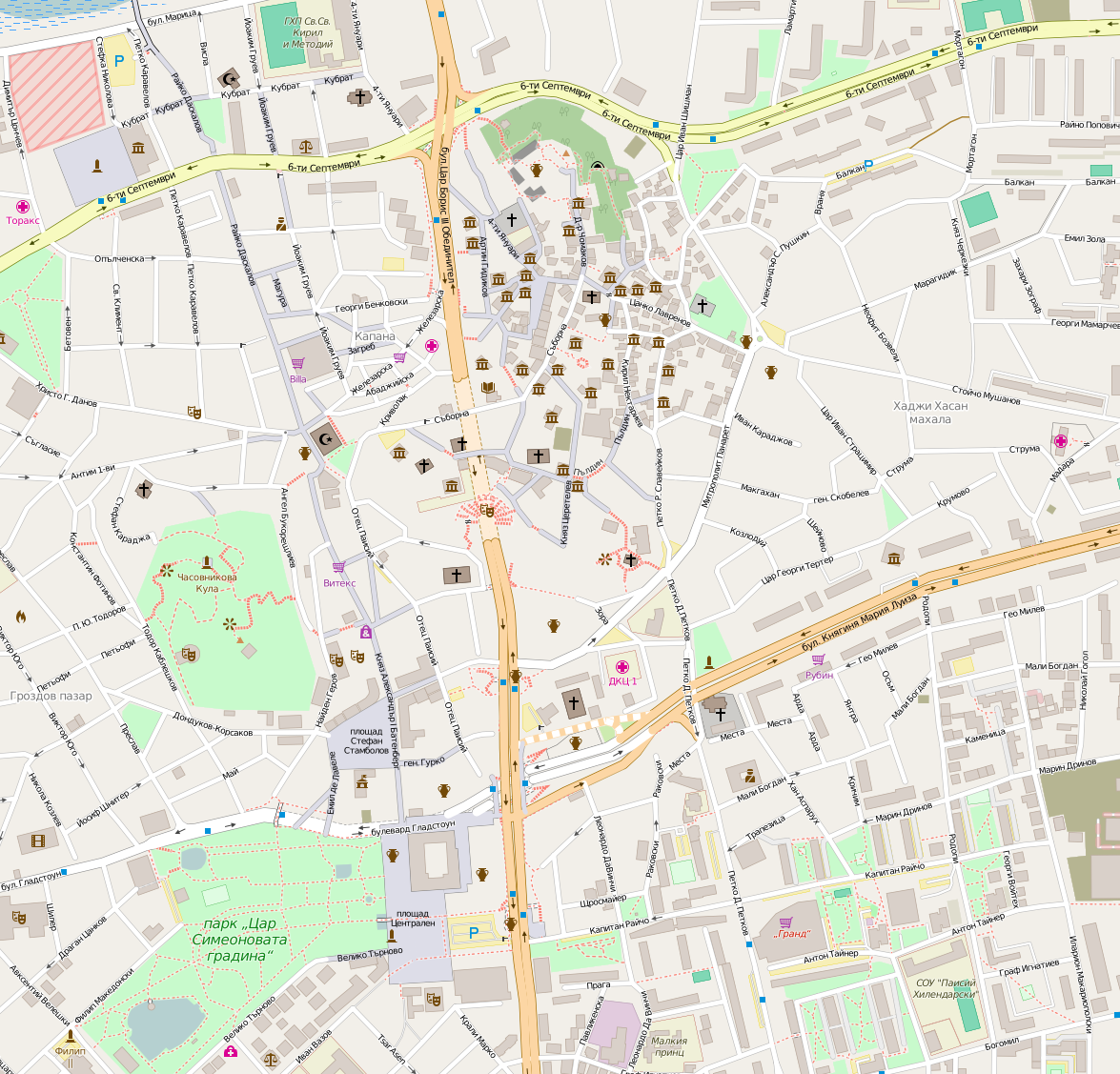
- Location within Plovdiv City Center
- 42.151236°N 24.752182°E
- Type: Citadel, Fortress
- Cultures: Thracians, Ancient Greek, Roman Empire
- Location: Plovdiv, Bulgaria

Site notes
- Material: bricks, marble, stone
- Condition: partially restored
- Owner: Plovdiv Municipality
- Public access: Yes

Nebet Tepe is one of the hills of Plovdiv where the ancient town was founded. The earliest settlements on Nebet Tepe are dated back to 4000 BC. The site was first settled by Thracians, later expanded by Philip II of Macedon and the Roman Empire. As the town expanded, Nebet Tepe became the citadel of the town's acropolis. There are remains of the city's walls, towers, and a postern from the time of Justinian leading down to the Maritsa river. Today, the archaeological complex on the hill is one of the most popular tourist sights in Plovdiv and a cultural monument of national significance.

== Name ==
The name "Nebet" comes from the Turkish words nevbet (meaning "guard") and tepe (meaning "hill") or "The hill of the guards". It is assumed that in ancient times the garrison that guarded the city was located on the hill. The hill has another name in ancient times - "The hill of Musaeus", which is associated with the Thracian Musaeus who was the most talented student of Orpheus.

== History ==
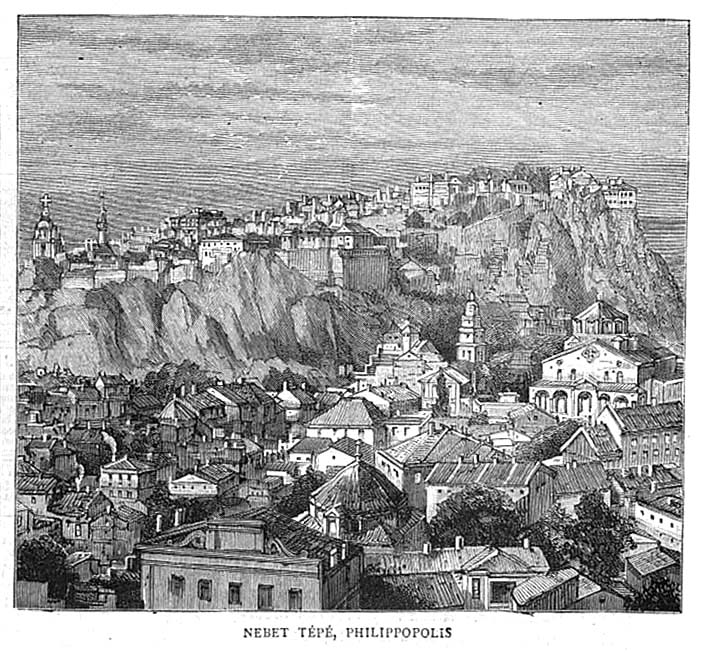
Painting of the three hills (1885)

== Archaeology ==
The remains of city walls, towers and ancient buildings were found during the excavations on Nebet Tepe. The oldest part of the walls on the hill dating from the 4th c. BC was built with large syenite blocks closely fitted together with minimal clearance between adjacent stones and no use of mortar, typical for ancient cyclopean masonry. The remains of the Western wall with the imposing quadrangular tower and its entrance are evidence of the Hellenistic period when the ancient town expanded and the city on Nebet Tepe became the citadel of the town's acropolis. There are also thick stone walls from later periods and other ancient buildings.

One of the most interesting excavations is the unique postern with staircase from Roman times: a secret tunnel in the rocks under the North wall built in the 6th century AD during the reign of Justinian. Some historians say that Apostle Paul walked through this tunnel. The postern is thought to have led to the banks of the Maritsa river.

Water reservoirs used for water supply were also located on the hill. A large rectangular water reservoir with a volume of 350 m^{3} is preserved in the Southern part of Nebet Tepe. It was built of alternating layers of stones and bricks while the inner walls and the floor were treated with hydrophobic coating.

Excavations from 2016 have brought to light a Roman wall bastion dating from the 1st c. AD.

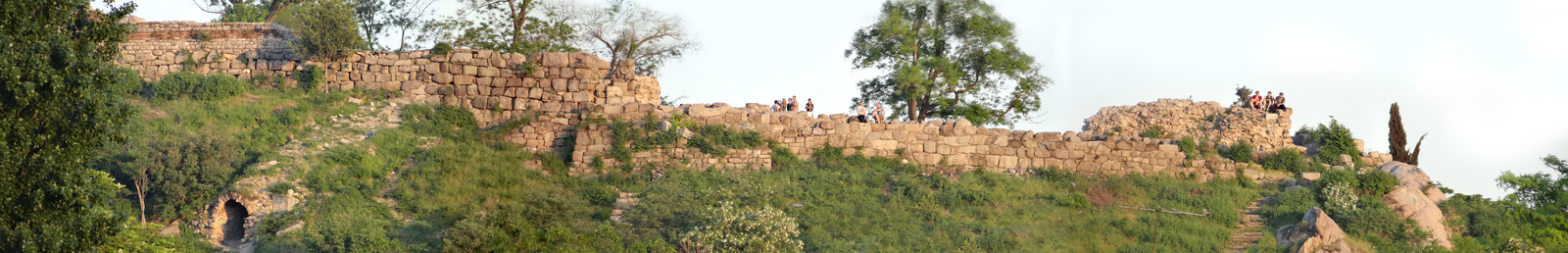
View of the Northern walls and the postern
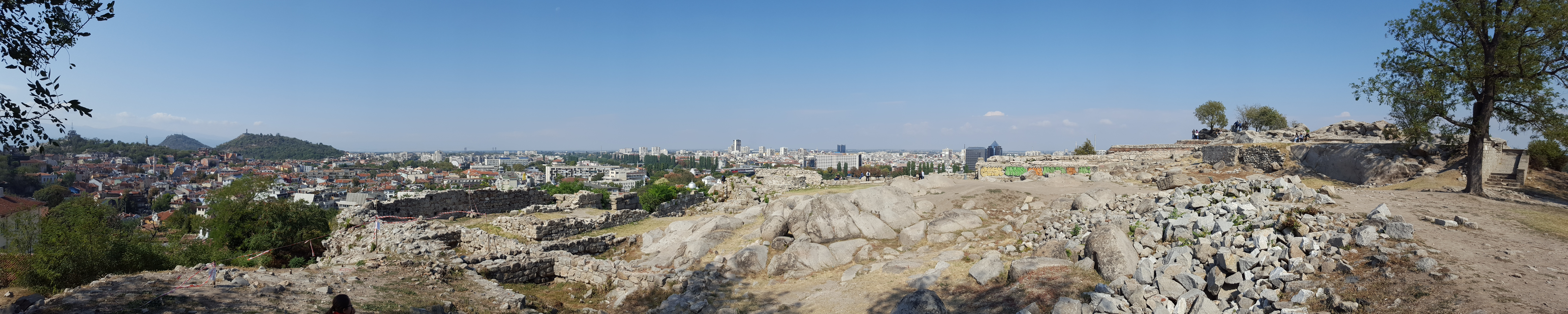
View from the top of Nebet Tepe

== Archaeological Complex "Nebet Tepe" ==
The archaeological complex Nebet Tepe has been researched, conserved, and exhibited as part of the project "Along the Fortress Walls of Philippopolis". Following its renovation, the site was officially opened to visitors on March 20, 2025, when it was assigned for management by the Municipality of Plovdiv to the Regional Archaeological Museum – Plovdiv. The site is freely accessible to visitors. The museum provides specialized guided tours, which are available only by prior reservation.

== Gallery ==
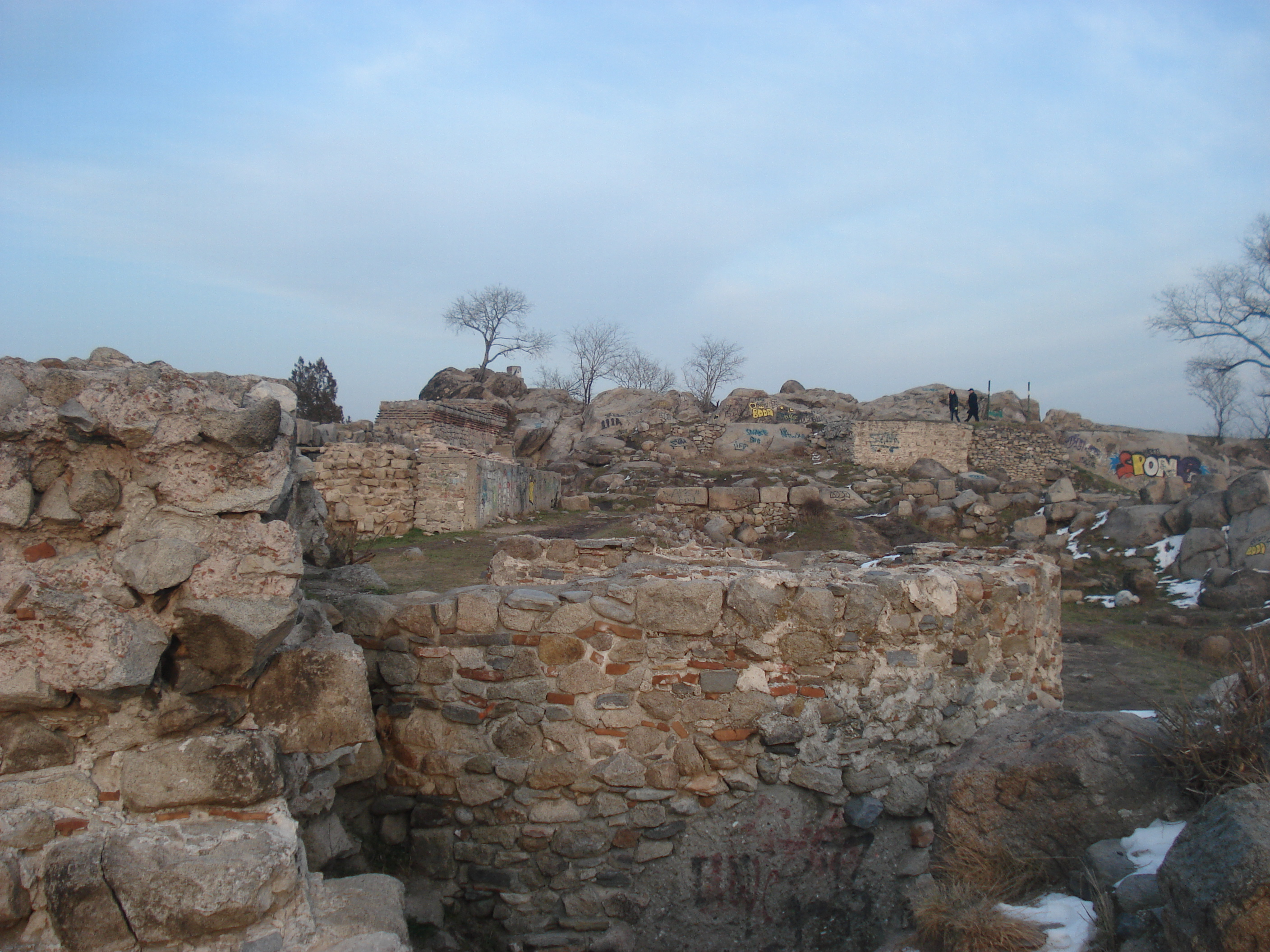
Stone walls and ancient water reservoir

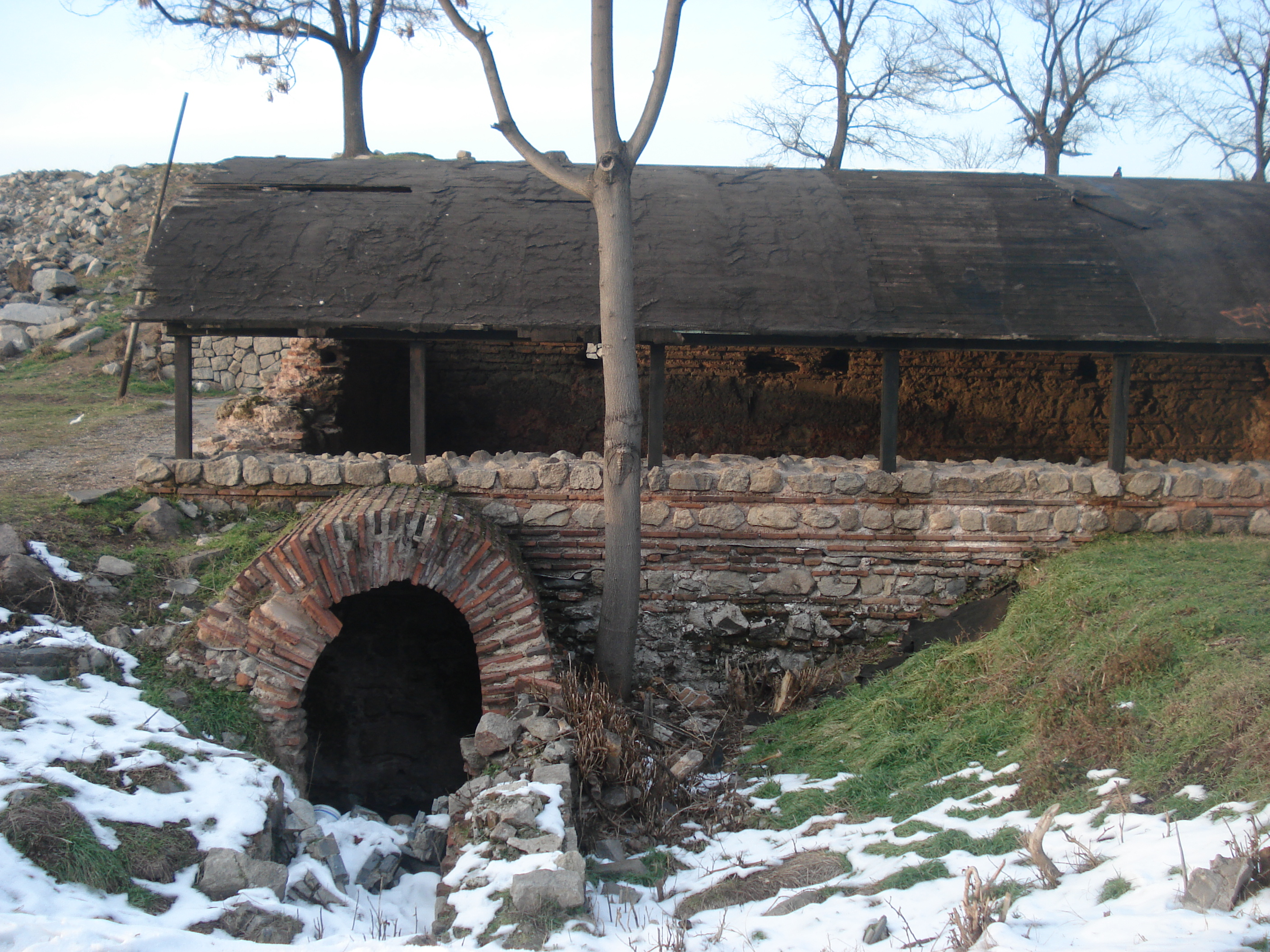
The water reservoir

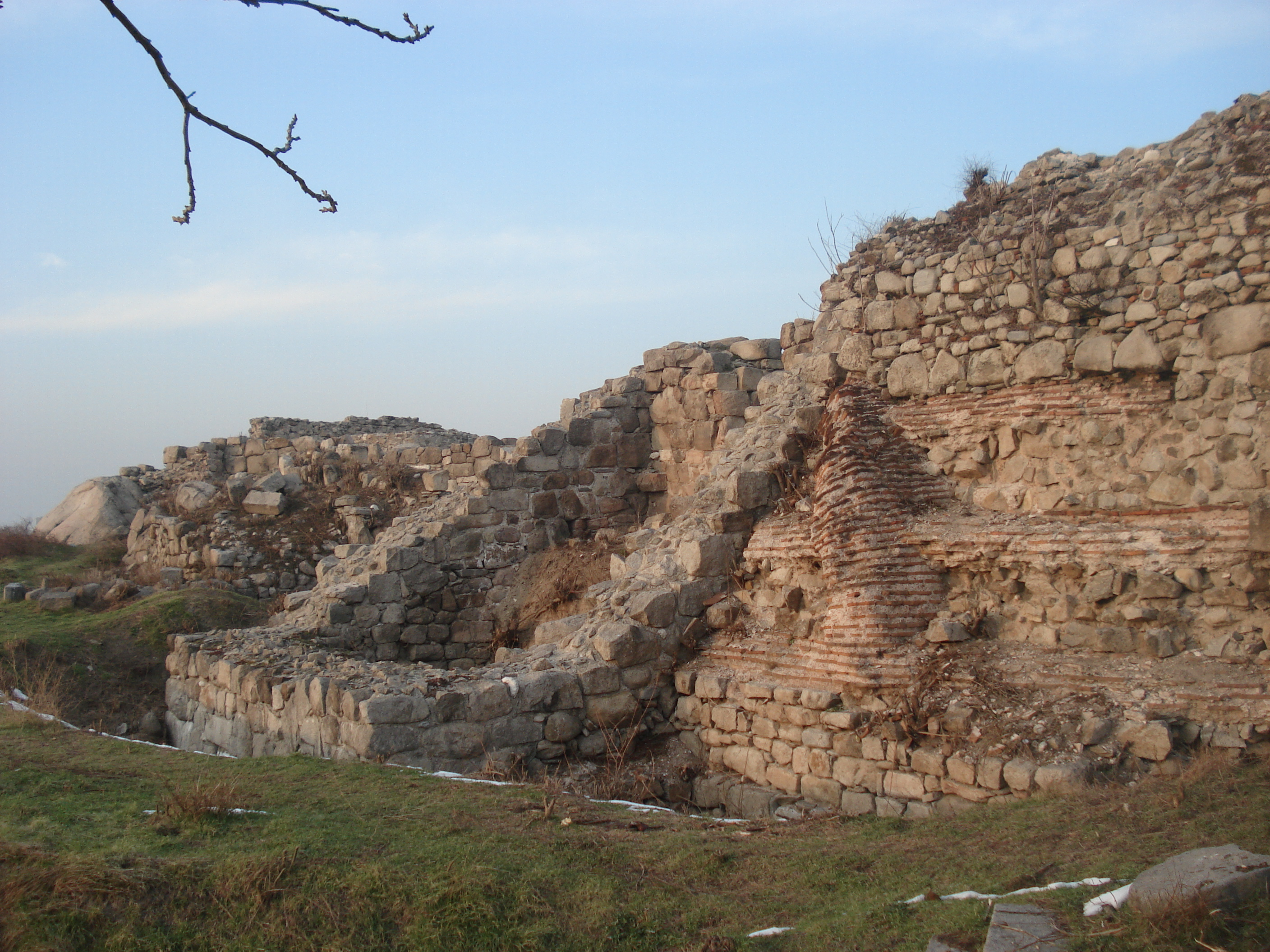
The quadrangular tower and Western walls

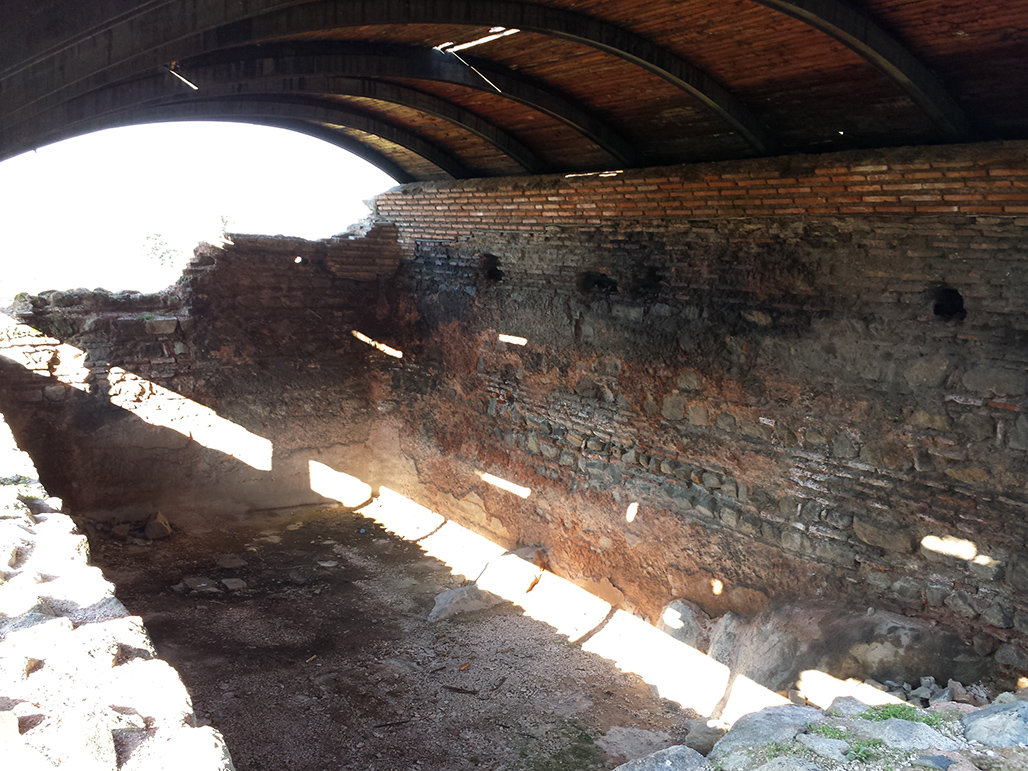
The inner walls of the water reservoir

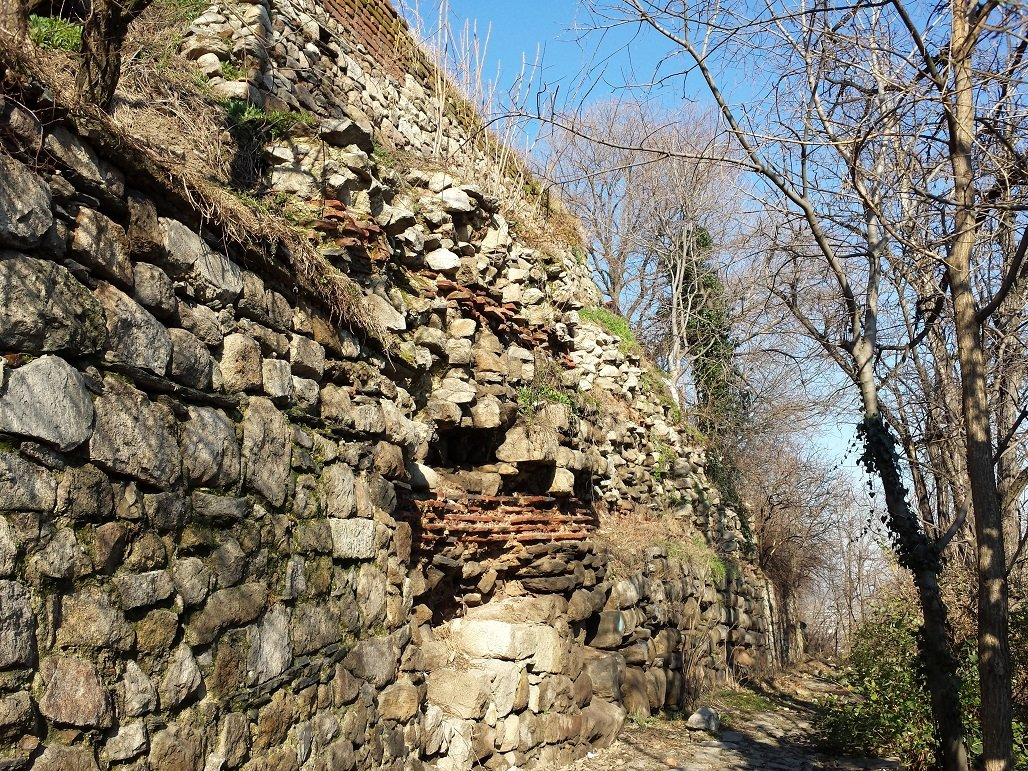
Eastern wall

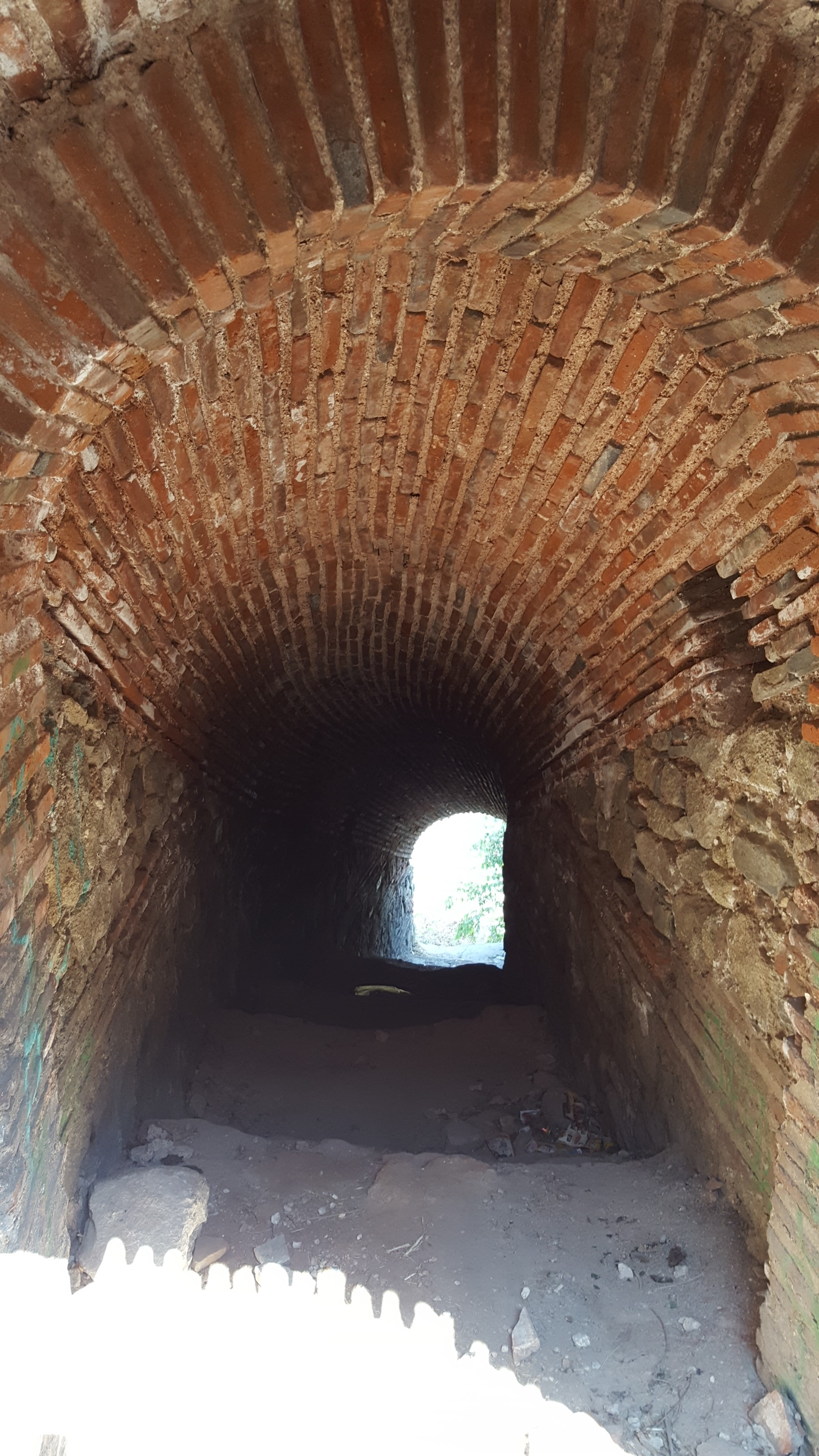
The postern

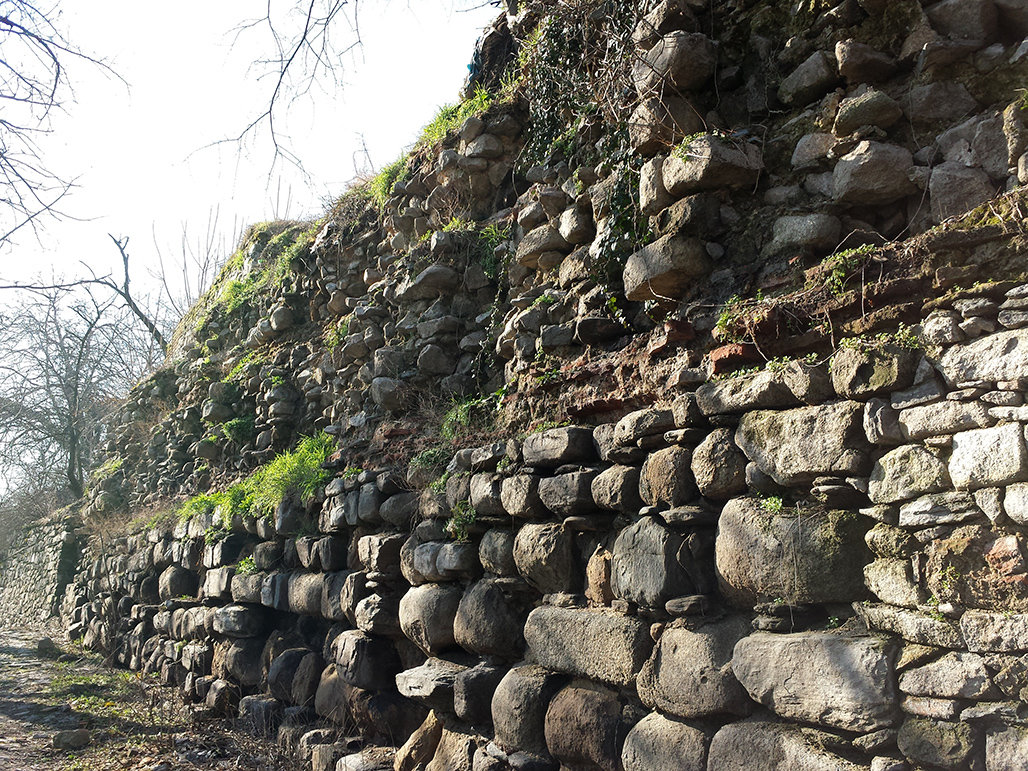
Eastern fortification

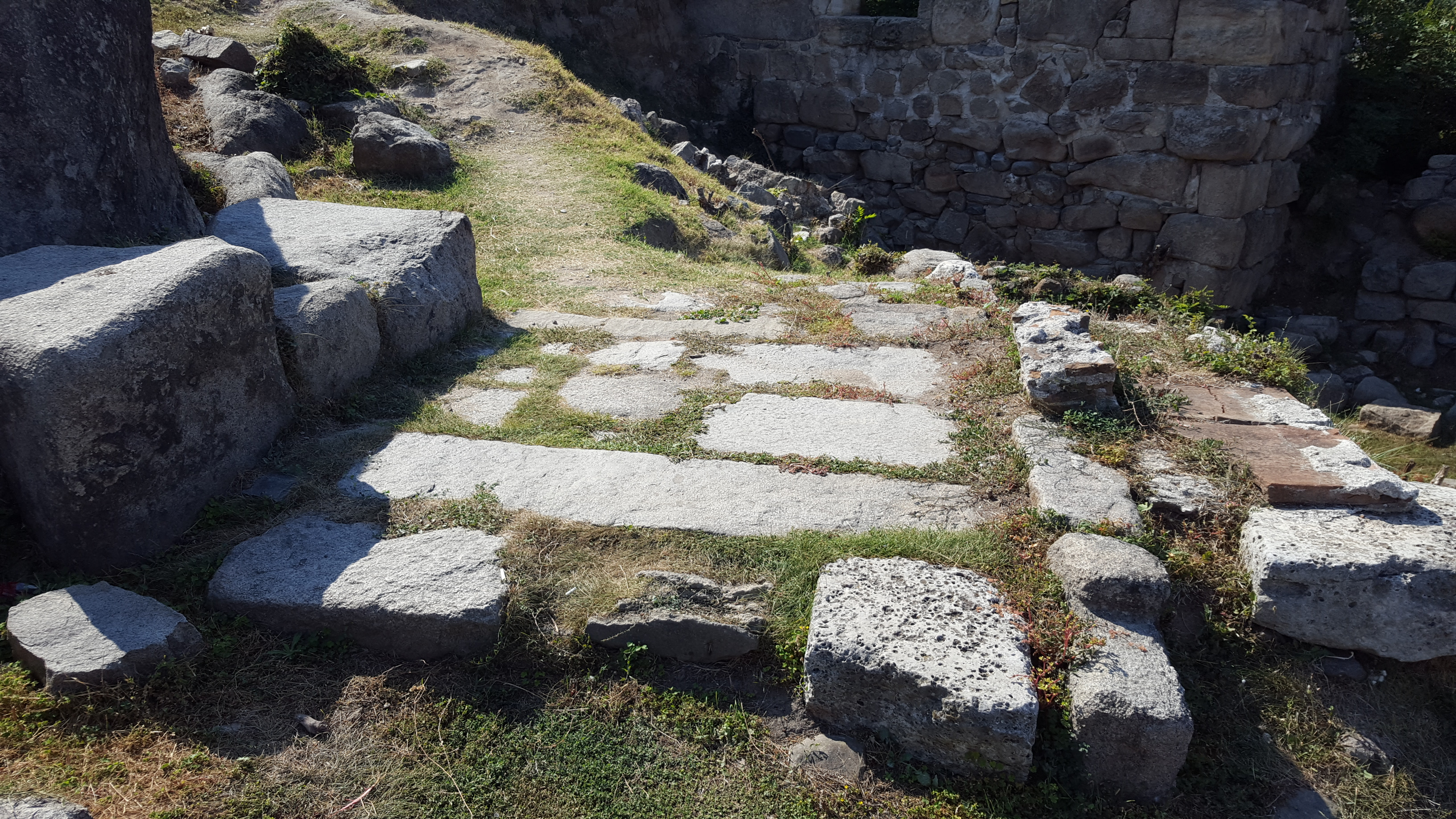
Ruins of ancient gate

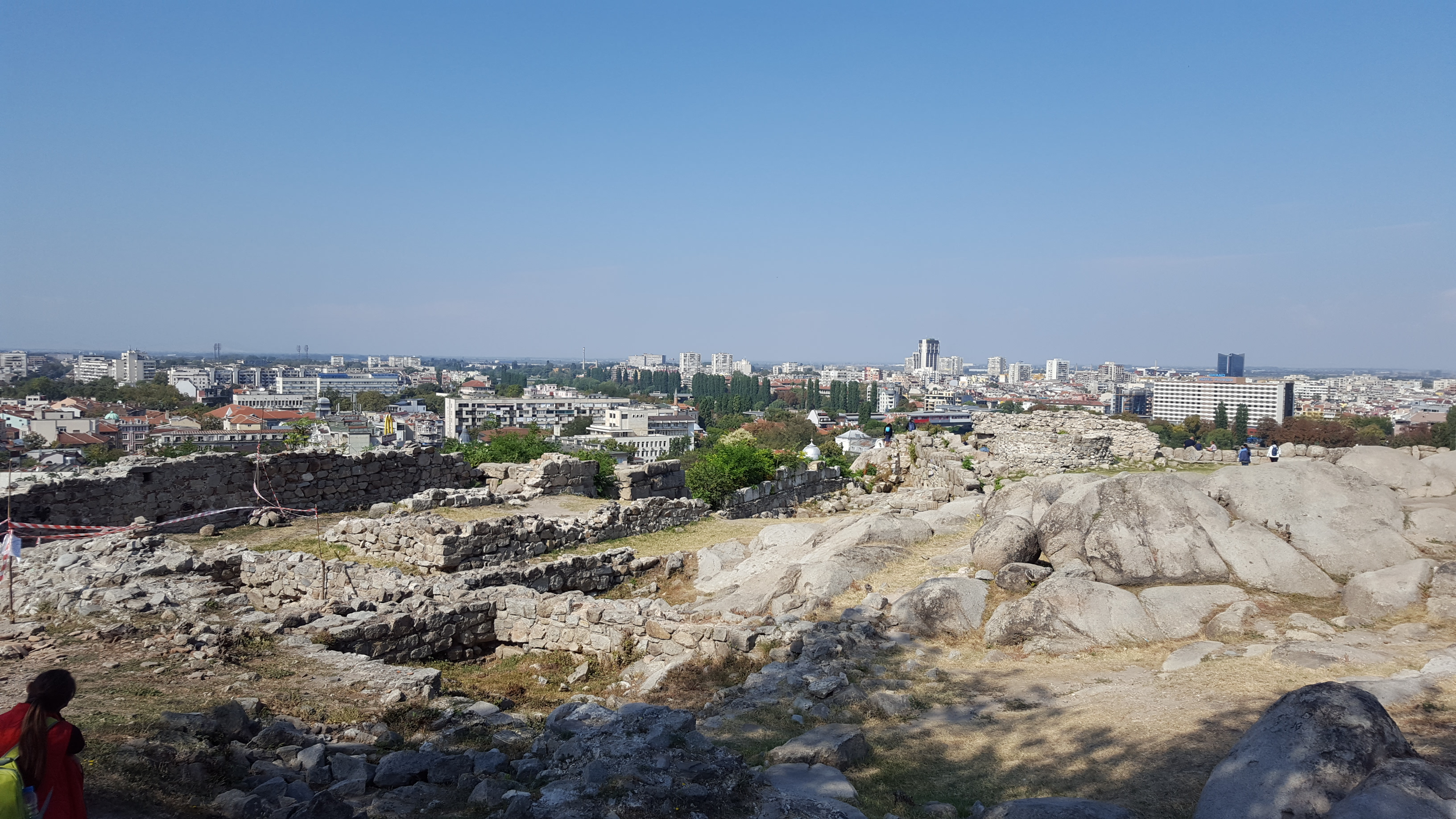
