= Tower Hill Postern =

Former gate in London Wall

Coordinates: 51°30′34″N 0°04′33″W

The Tower Hill Postern was a small fortified entrance (postern) at the eastern terminal point to the London Wall, at the junction of the Wall and the Tower of London moat. The size of the gateway indicates that it was suitable for pedestrians and horsemen but not wide enough to accommodate wagons, carts or carriages.

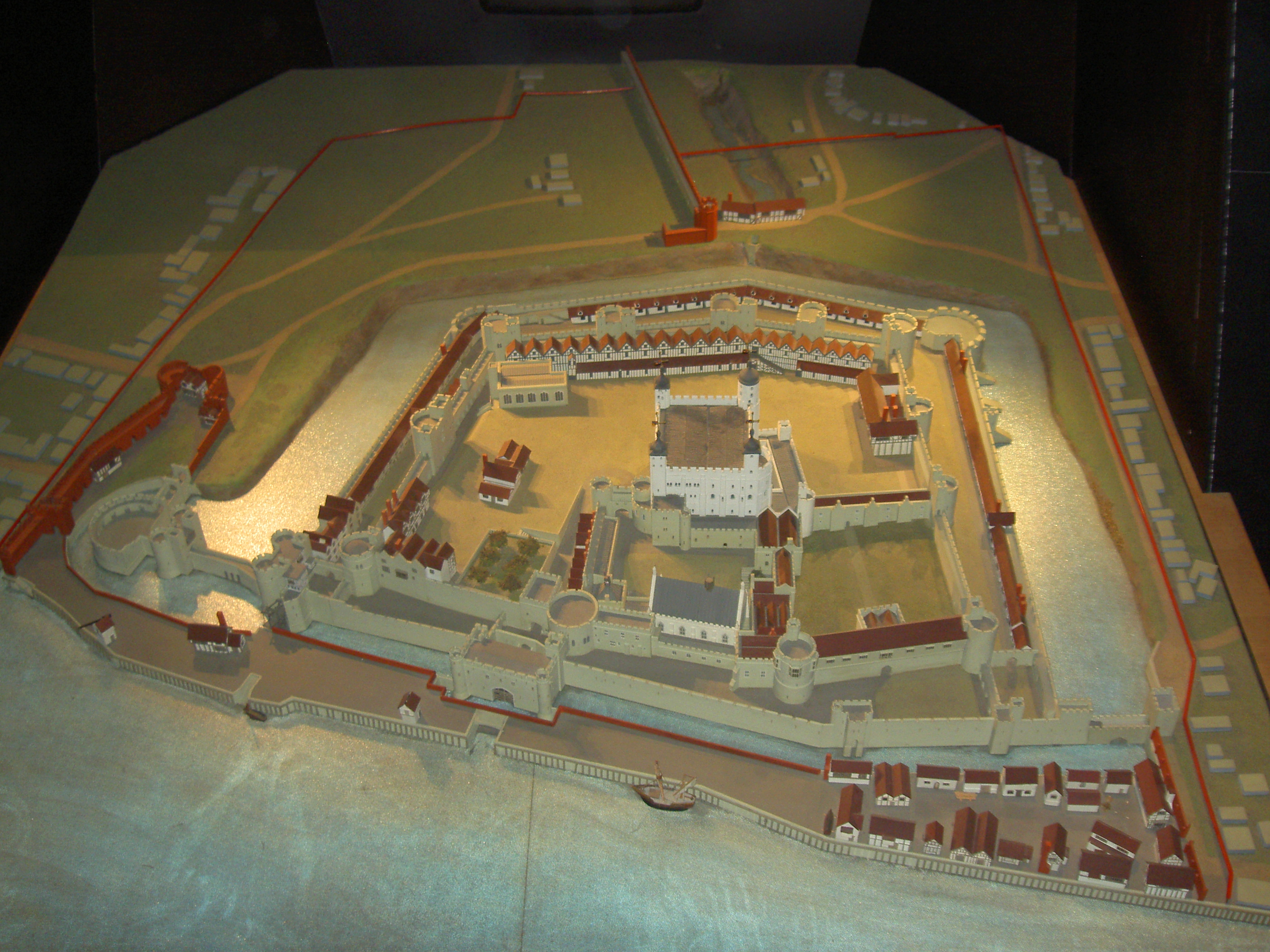
The Postern in context - the Postern, coloured red, is at the end of the London Wall, just above the moat on the picture.

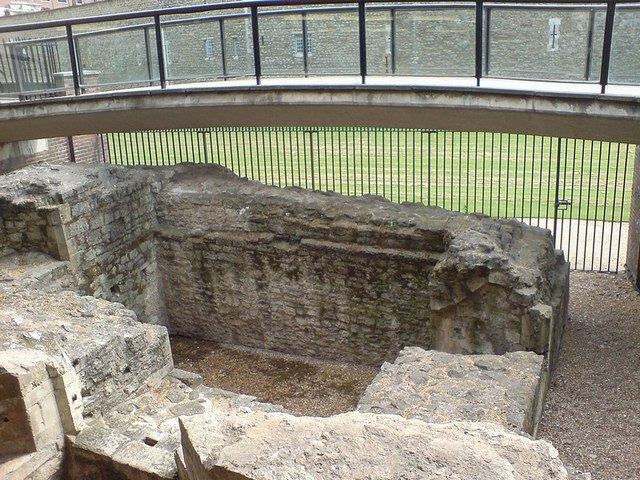
Foundations of the Tower Hill Postern

== Antecedent gateway ==
There is no evidence for a gateway on the site earlier than the building erected by Edward I around 1297-1308, and no reason for there to have been a gateway there before the expansion of the Tower of London. There are a number of circumstantial arguments including arguments based on road alignments, records of parochial disputes and indirect references by William Fitzstephen to indicate that there may have been a gateway further south that was replaced when much of the wall was demolished as part of the expansion of the Tower.

== History ==
The Tower of London moat was dug in around 1270 as part of a scheme to extend the Tower, and part of the London Wall was demolished to make room for the expanded Tower and Moat. The postern at the edge of the moat, at the wall's new terminal point was probably built soon after, most likely in the period 1297-1308. The southern tower, which was built from Caen stone, partially collapsed in either 1431 or 1440, sliding vertically down three metres into the Tower Moat. The tower remained standing and though functionally impaired remained in use. There was a subsequent degree of re-building.

== Structure ==
The southern tower included a ground floor and a cellar, thought to have been reached by a ladder. The cellar had a window overlooking the moat. The remains of a stairwell and a portcullis chase indicate that there was an upper floor and perhaps also a parapet on the roof. Nothing is known for certain about the tower north of the gateway except the information that can be gleaned from cartographic sources, all of which postdate the collapse of the southern tower. Some believe that the northern and surviving southern towers existed at the same time, while others think the northern tower was erected subsequently, to compensate for the loss of the southern tower.

== Setting ==
The postern was situated in the Tower Liberty, an area outside the jurisdiction of the City of London, which included the Tower itself and the surrounding areas. The area was under the control of the Tower in order that the defensibility of the Tower was not compromised by development leading up to the edge of the castle and its moat. The Tower Liberty is still outside the authority of the City, now forming part of the London Borough of Tower Hamlets.

== Remains ==
The foundations of the southern tower, which sunk into the moat, were excavated in 1979 and can be seen in the Tower Hill underpass.
