= London Wall =

Defensive wall built around London

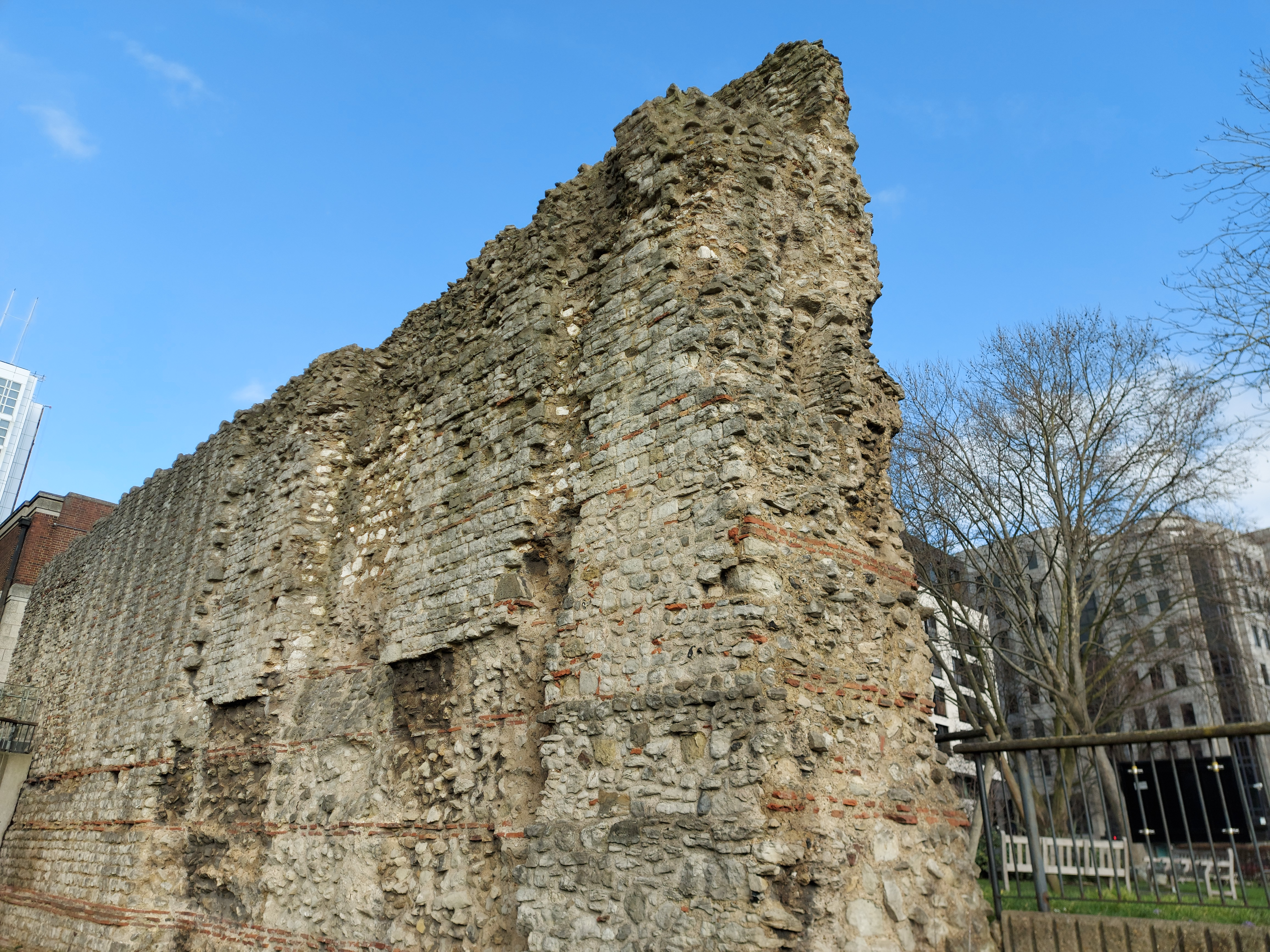
- London Roman Wall – surviving section by Tower Hill gardens cross-section

- City of London, within Greater London
- 51.5099382°N 0.077028°W
- Type: Fortification
- Periods: Roman to late 18th century
- Location: Central London
- Region: Greater London

History
- Built: c. AD 200

Site notes
- Material: Kentish ragstone (Roman sections) and brick (later additions)
- Length: 2.5 miles (4.0 km)
- Area: 0.514 m^{2} (5.53 sq ft)
- Condition: Fragmentary remains
- Public access: Partially

Scheduled monument

Londinium in the year 400 showing the Roman wall

The London Wall is a defensive wall first built by the Romans around the strategically important port town of Londinium in c. AD 200, as well as the name of a modern street in the City of London, England.

Roman London was, from around 120–150, protected by a large fort, with a large garrison, that stood to its north-western side. The fort, now referred to as the Cripplegate Fort, was later incorporated into a comprehensive city-wide defence, with its strengthened northern and western sides becoming part of the Wall which was built around 200. The incorporation of the fort's walls gave the walled area its distinctive shape in the north-west part of the city.

The end of Roman rule in Britain, around 410, led to the wall falling into disrepair. It was restored in the late Anglo-Saxon period, a process generally thought to have begun under Alfred the Great after 886. Repairs and enhancements continued throughout the medieval period. The wall largely defined the boundaries of the City of London until the later Middle Ages, when population rises and the development of towns around the city blurred the perimeter.

From the 18th century onward, the expansion of the City of London saw large parts of the wall demolished, including its city gates, to improve traffic flow. Since the Second World War, conservation efforts have helped to preserve surviving sections of the city wall as scheduled monuments.

The long presence of the walls has had a profound and continuing effect on the character of the City of London, and surrounding areas. The walls constrained the growth of the city, and the location of the limited number of gates and the route of the roads through them shaped development within the walls, and more fundamentally, beyond them. With few exceptions, the modern roads heading into the former walled area are the same as those which passed through the former medieval gates.

== History ==
=== Roman London Wall ===
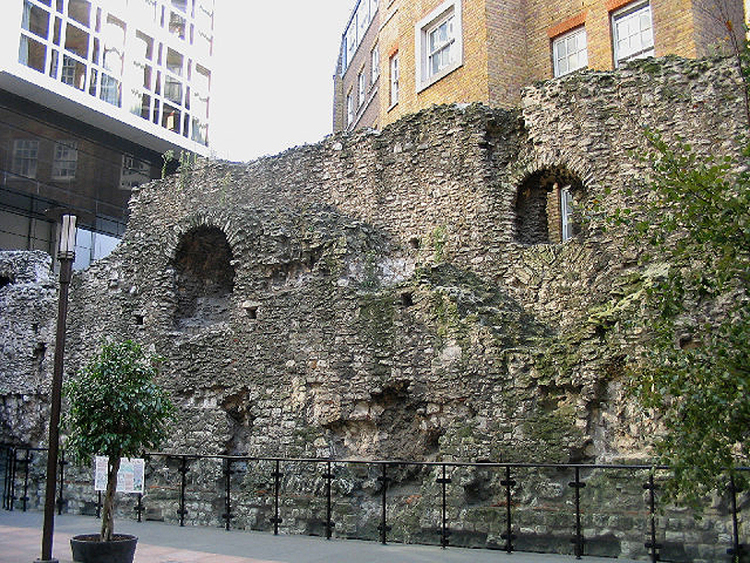
A surviving fragment of the original 3rd-century Roman Wall in Cooper's Row near Tower Hill

It has origins as an initial mound wall and ditch from c. AD 100 and a fort, now called Cripplegate fort after the city gate (Cripplegate) that was subsequently built on its northern wall later on, in 120–150

The fort was later incorporated into a city-wide defence in the late 2nd or early 3rd century AD, though the reason for such a large and expensive fortification is unknown. The fort's north and west walls were thickened and doubled in height to form part of the new city wall. The incorporation of the fort's walls gave the walled area its distinctive shape in the north-west part of the city.

It continued to be developed until at least the end of the 4th century, making it among the last major building projects undertaken by the Romans before the Roman departure from Britain in 410. Reasons for its construction may have been connected to the invasion of northern Britain by Picts who overran Hadrian's Wall in the 180s. This may be linked to the political crisis that emerged in the late 2nd century when the governor of Britain Clodius Albinus was consolidating his power after claiming the right of succession as Roman emperor. After a struggle with his rival Septimius Severus, Albinus was defeated in 197 at the Battle of Lugdunum (near Lyon, France). The economic stimulus provided by the wall and Septimius's subsequent campaigns in Scotland improved Londinium's financial prosperity in the early 3rd century.

==== Roman London wall characteristics ====
The wall's gateways coincided with their alignment to the British network of Roman roads. The original gates, clockwise from Ludgate in the west to Aldgate in the east, were: Ludgate, Newgate, Cripplegate, Bishopsgate and Aldgate. Aldersgate, between Newgate and Cripplegate, was added around 350. Moorgate, initially just a postern i.e. a secondary gate, was built later still, in the medieval period.

The length and size of the wall made it one of the biggest construction projects in Roman Britain. It had gateways, towers and defensive ditches, and was built from Kentish ragstone, which was brought by barge from quarries near Maidstone. It was 2 miles (3.2 km) long, enclosing an area of about 330 acres (130 ha). It was 8 to 10 ft (2.5 to 3 m) wide and up to 20 ft (6 m) high. The ditch or fossa in front of the outer wall was 6 ft 7 in (2 m) deep and up to 16 ft (5 m) wide. There were at least 22 towers spaced about 210 ft (64 m) apart on the eastern section of the wall.

==== Roman Thamesside wall ====
Excavation work has traced a significant development of 980 feet (300 m) of timber-framed waterfronts to the east and west of the modern site of London Bridge, with a piece of wooden bridge found at the end of Fish Street Hill. The constructions advancing around 115 feet (35 m) into the River Thames took place between the late 1st and mid-3rd centuries, highlighting that between these periods no wall stood against the river.

After Londinium was raided on several occasions by Saxon pirates in the late 3rd century, construction of an additional riverside wall, built in phases, began in 280 and was repaired c. 390. The existence of this riverside section was long doubted due to a lack of evidence, but excavations at the Tower of London in 1977 showed that the section of the inner curtain wall between the Lanthorne and Wakefield Towers, to the south of the White Tower, was originally the eastern part of the Roman riverside wall that was built or rebuilt in the late 4th century. The riverside wall may have limited access to the Thames, both commercial and otherwise, so it may have reflected a diminished level of activity within the city.

It is not clear how long the riverside wall survived, but there are references to a part of it near the dock of Queenhithe, in two charters of 889 and 898. There is currently no evidence of post-Roman restoration, so surviving sections are not likely to have been part, or an important part, of defences much after the Roman period.

==== Post-Roman disrepair ====
The end of Roman rule in Britain in c. 410 resulted in the wall slowly falling into disrepair, though the survival of Romano-British culture in the area is indicated by the settlement in the nearby St Martin-in-the-Fields area of Westminster, which persisted until around 450.

The Anglo-Saxon Chronicle notes that the Romano-British retreated back to London after their bloody defeat at the Battle of Crecganford (Crayford, Kent) at the hands of Hengist and Horsa, leaders of the Saxon invaders, in 457. This suggests that London's walls retained some military value, although the Anglo-Saxon Chronicle was written many centuries after the Battle of Crayford took place, if it took place at all.

=== Anglo-Saxon London Wall ===
==== Anglo-Saxon city revival ====
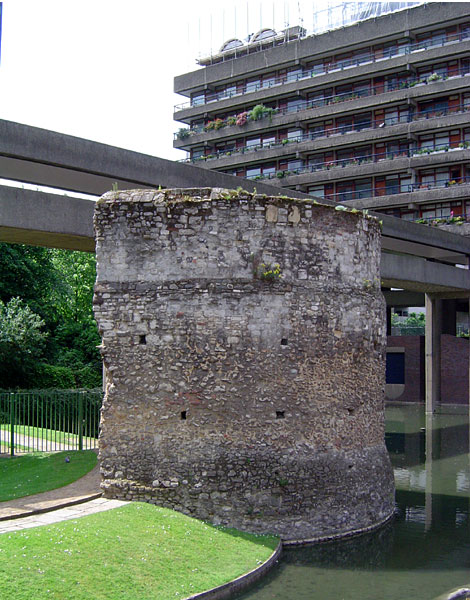
Bastion 12, which is near the Barbican Estate, stands on Roman foundations with an upper structure of 13th-century masonry.

From c. 500, an Anglo-Saxon settlement known as Lundenwic developed in the same area slightly to the west of the abandoned Roman city, in the vicinity of the Strand.

In 886 the King of Wessex, Alfred the Great, formally agreed to the terms of the Danish warlord, Guthrum, concerning the area of political and geographical control that had been acquired by the incursion of the Vikings. Within the eastern and northern part of England, with its boundary roughly stretching from London to Chester, the Scandinavians would establish Danelaw.

==== Anglo-Saxon London Wall restoration ====
In the same year, the Anglo-Saxon Chronicle recorded that London was "refounded" by Alfred. Archaeological research shows that this involved abandonment of Lundenwic and a revival of life and trade within the old Roman walls. This was part Alfred's policy of building an in-depth defence of the Kingdom of Wessex against the Vikings as well as creating an offensive strategy against the Vikings who controlled Mercia. The burh of Southwark was also created on the south bank of the River Thames during this time.

The city walls of London were repaired as the city slowly grew until about 950 when urban activity increased dramatically. A large Viking army that attacked the London burgh was defeated in 994.

=== Medieval London Wall ===
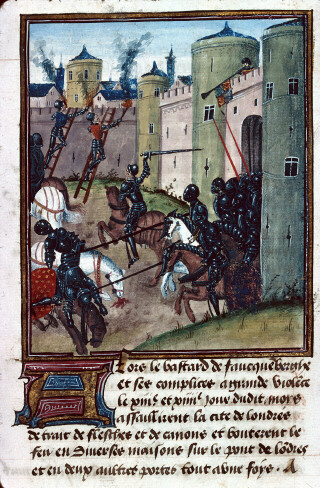
Yorkist forces attack the Lancastrians during the siege of London, 12–15 May 1471.

By the 11th century, London was beyond all comparison the largest town in England. Old St Paul's Cathedral, rebuilt in the Romanesque style by King William the Conqueror and his successors, was on its completion one of the longest churches in Europe. Winchester had previously been the capital of Anglo-Saxon England, but from this time on, London was the main forum for foreign traders and the base for defence in time of war. In the view of Frank Stenton: "It had the resources, and it was rapidly developing the dignity and the political self-consciousness appropriate to a national capital."

==== Medieval London Wall restoration ====
The size and importance of London led to the redevelopment of the city's defences. During the early medieval period – following the Norman Conquest of England – the walls underwent substantial work that included crenellations, additional gates and further towers and bastions. Aside from the seven City Wall gates and the four bars, there are the 13 water-gates on the Thames where goods were unloaded from ships. These include Billingsgate and Bridge Gate. Additionally there were pedestrian-only gates such as the Tower Hill Postern at Tower Hill.

A further medieval defensive feature was the restoration of the defensive ditch immediately adjacent to the outside of the wall. The street name Houndsditch recalls a part of this former feature. This seems to have been re-cut in 1213, with the restored ditch being V-cut to a depth of six feet (1.8 metres) and a width of between nine and fifteen feet (2.7 and 4.6 metres).

The re-cut of the ditch may have diverted some of the waters of the Walbrook which would otherwise have flowed through the city, and the wall itself does appear to have acted like a dam, partially obstructing the Walbrook and leading to the marshy conditions at the open space of Moorfields, just north of the wall.

As London continued to grow throughout the medieval period, urban development grew beyond the city walls. This expansion led to the suffix words "Without" and "Within" which denote whether an area of the City – and usually applied to the wards – fell outside or within the London Wall, though only Farringdon and (formerly) Bridge were split into separate wards this way (Bridge Without falling beyond the gates on London Bridge). Some wards – Aldersgate, Bishopsgate and Cripplegate – cover an area that was both within and outside the wall; although not split into separate wards, often the part (or "division") within the Wall is denoted (on maps, in documents, etc.) as being "within" and the part outside the Wall as being "without". Archaically infra (within) and extra (without) were also used and the terms "intramural" and "extramural" are also used to describe being within or outside the walled part of the city.

The suffix is applied to some churches and parishes near the city gateways, such as St Audoen within Newgate and St Botolph-without-Bishopsgate.

==== Blackfriars extension ====
Edward I gave the Dominican Friars (or Black Friars) permission to demolish and re-route the section of City wall between Ludgate and the Thames. They did this in stages between 1284 and 1320, extending the walled area as far as the River Fleet so that it enclosed their precinct. The westward extension is likely to have improved the defensibility of Ludgate.

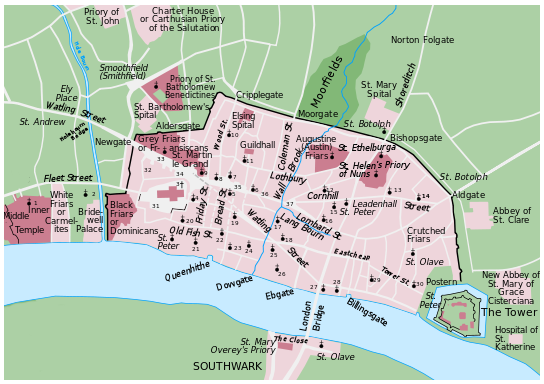
The City of London around 1300. The Blackfriars extension is in the south-west of the city.

==== The Wall and the developed area ====
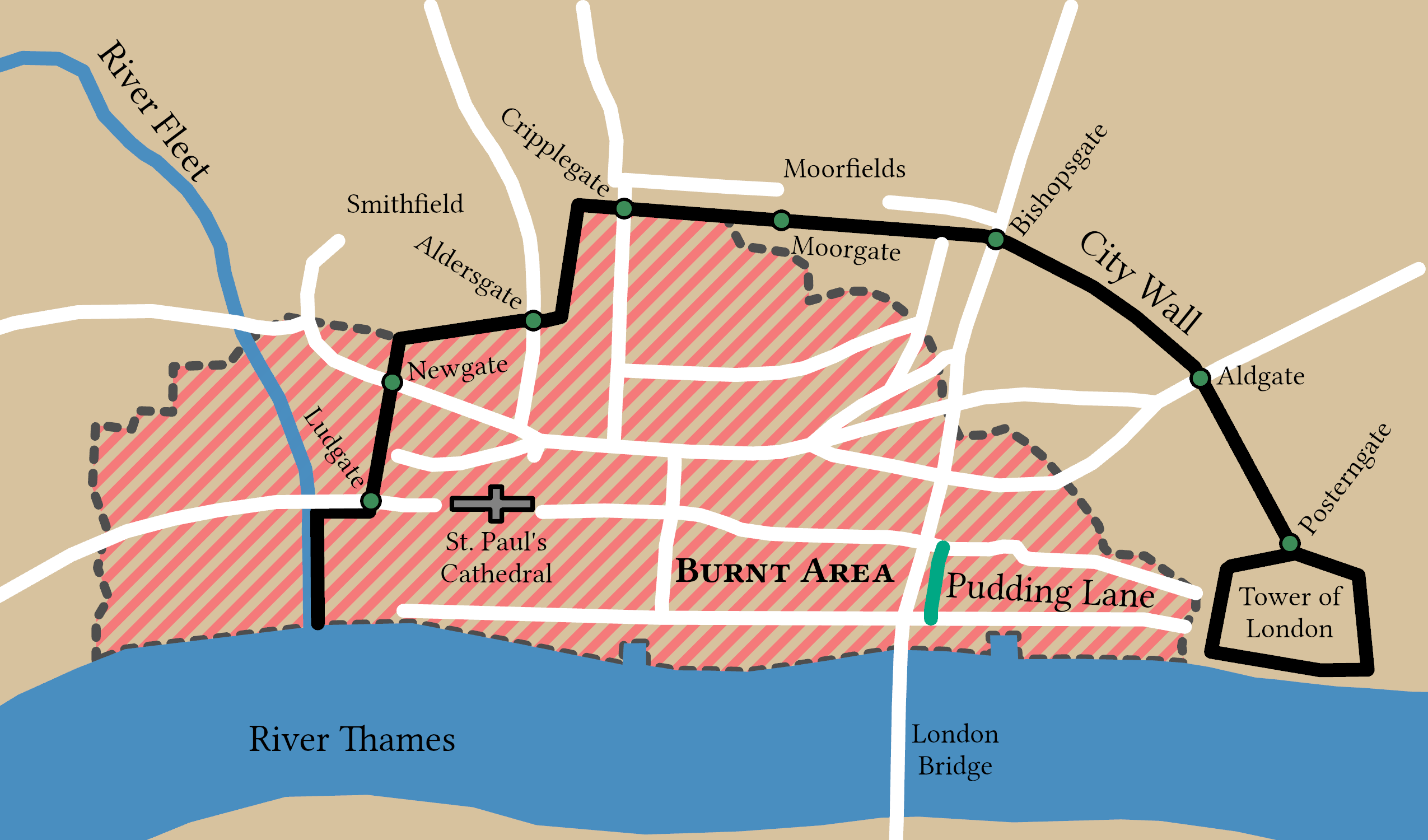
Pink area shows the extent of the 1666 Great Fire of London. Most of the city within the walls was destroyed.

In the medieval period the developed area of the city was largely confined to the City Wall, but there was extramural development, especially in the large western ward of Farringdon Without. The wall provided security but was a constraint to accessibility and growth. The extent of the city's jurisdiction has changed little from 1000 to the modern day; but the extramural parts were long home to only a few people. A notable late change to the boundary appears to be that Stow's Survey of London suggests that the part of Moorfields next to the wall was still, in 1603, outside the city's jurisdiction.

The boundary of the city's jurisdiction was marked by "city bars", toll gates which were situated just beyond the old walled area; Holborn Bar, Temple Bar, West Smithfield Bar, and Whitechapel Bar. These were the important entrances to the city and their control was vital in maintaining the city's special privileges over certain trades.

==== Great Fire of London ====
During the Great Fire of London in September 1666, almost all of the medieval City of London inside the wall was destroyed, but the wall and gates survived.

==== Demolition ====
The seven gates to the City of London, with many repairs and rebuilding over the years, stood until they were all demolished between 1760 and 1767. Work to demolish the walls continued into the 19th century; however, large sections of the wall were incorporated into other structures.

=== 20th century London Wall ===
==== Second World War ====
===== London Blitz =====
The Blitz during the Second World War, through the sheer scale of bombing and destruction of buildings and the surrounding landscape, revealed numerous parts of the London Wall.

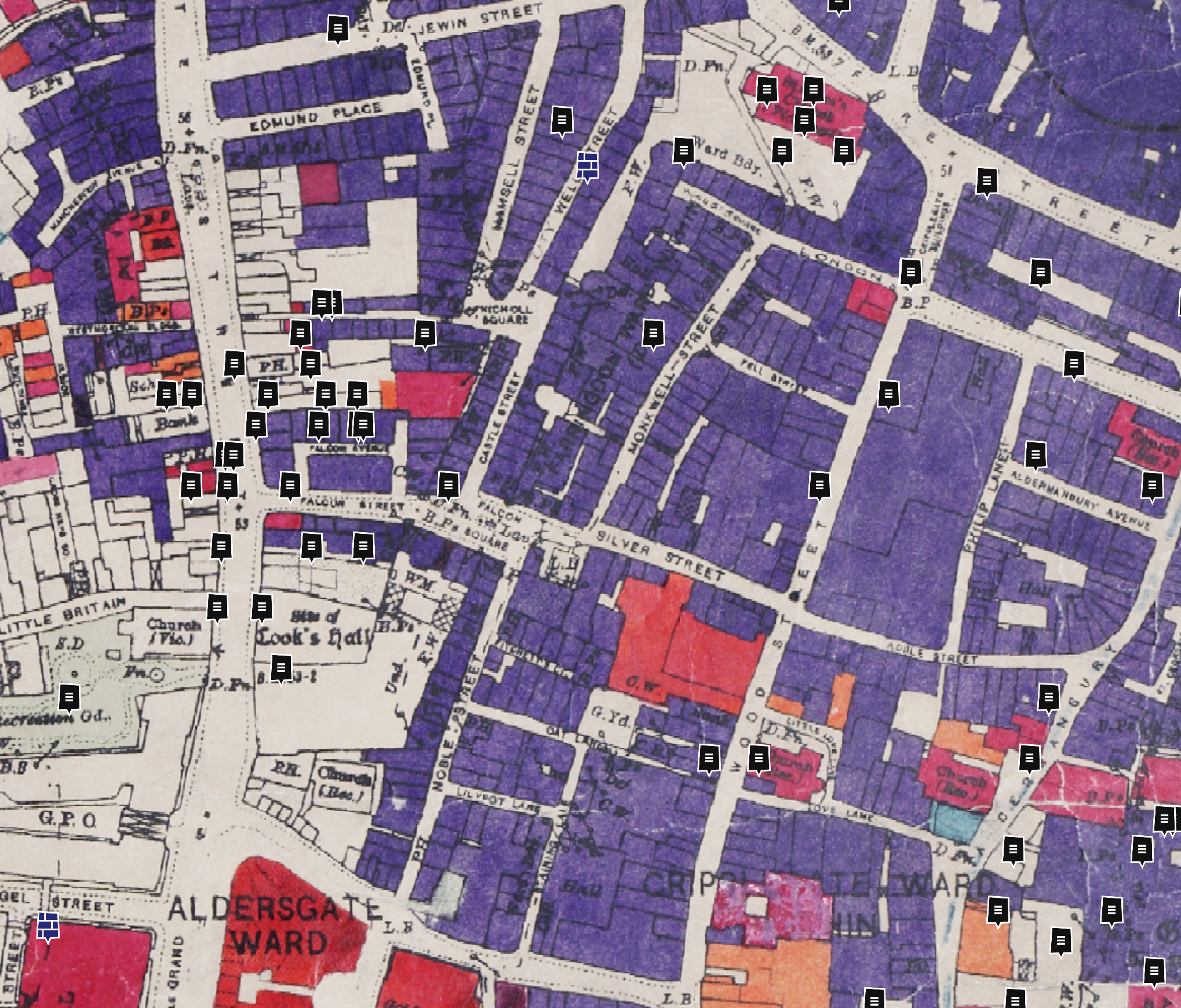
Noble Street and surrounding area bombing, mapped in 1945. From the centre of the image upwards can be seen semi-circle lines, representing the London Wall bastions 12–14 which were incorporated into buildings.

At 00:15 on 28 August 1940, during the pre-wave of bombing before the Blitz, buildings and parts of the wall were destroyed between Fore Street and St. Alphage's churchyard gardens around Cripplegate. This revealed parts of the wall unseen for over 300 years as the rubble of buildings destroyed around it were removed.

On 29 December 1940, heavy bombing led to conditions known as the Second Great Fire of London. Bomb damage revealed a section of wall at Noble Street, near the Museum of London.

==== Post-war loss ====
In 1957, a 64-metre section of the wall was uncovered during works on the London Wall road; the section was then destroyed to accommodate the road changes and to make way for a new car park. An 11-metre section has been preserved.

==== Conservation and heritage efforts ====
In 1984, the Museum of London set up a Wall Walk from the Tower of London to the museum, using 23 tiled panels. A number of these have been destroyed in subsequent years. At Noble Street, the panels were replaced by etched glass panels. These were intended as a prototype for new panels along the entire walk, but no further replacements have been made. One of the largest and most readily accessed fragments of the wall stands just outside Tower Hill tube station, with a replica statue of the Emperor Trajan standing in front of it. There is a further surviving section preserved in the basement of the One America Square building. There are further remains in the basement of the Old Bailey.

=== Impact on current city ===
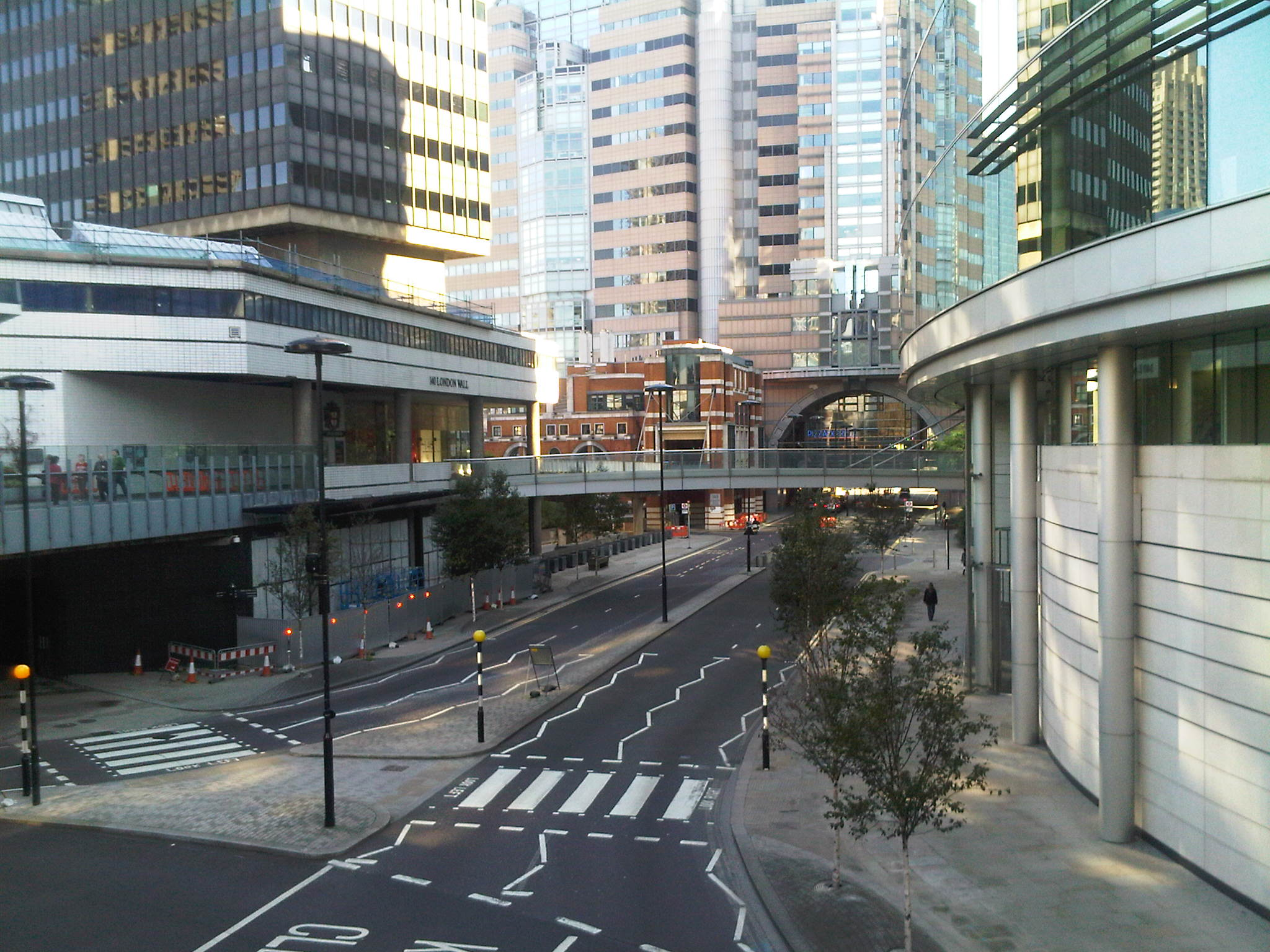
The modern (post-1976) road named London Wall

The layout of the Roman and medieval walls have had a profound effect on the development of London, even down to the present day. The walls constrained the growth of the city, and the location of the limited number of gates and the route of the roads through them shaped development within the walls, and in a much more fundamental way, beyond them. With a few exceptions, the parts of the modern road network heading into the former walled area are the same as those which passed through the former medieval gates.

Part of the route originally taken by the northern wall is commemorated, although now only loosely followed, by the road also named London Wall. The modern road starts in the west with the Rotunda junction at Aldersgate, then runs east past Moorgate, from which point it runs parallel to the line of the City Wall, and eventually becomes Wormwood Street before it reaches Bishopsgate. This alignment, however, is the result of rebuilding between 1957 and 1976. Before this, London Wall was narrower, and ran behind the line of the City Wall for its entire length, from Wormwood Street to Wood Street. The western section is now St Alphage Garden.

== Course ==
=== Eastern wall section ===
==== Tower of London ====
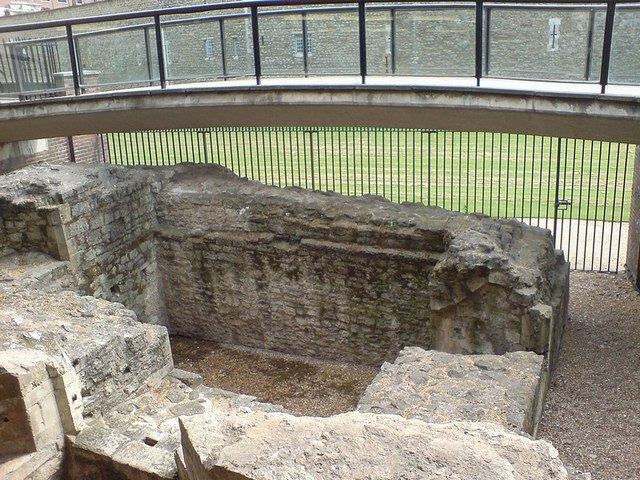
The medieval postern gate by the tower of London

The eastern section of the wall starts in what is now the Tower of London. Within the grounds of the Tower remains of the eastern most wall can still be seen along with a line in the paths heading North within the Tower grounds to outline where it used to run before most of it was demolished to expand the fortification of the Tower. This followed on with a junction at the Tower of London's moat to the Tower Hill Postern, Gate 1, a medieval fortified entrance. The foundation to this entrance can still be seen today within the Tower Hill pedestrian subway. Other large sections of the wall can also be seen further ahead within the Tower Hill gardens.

==== Aldgate ====
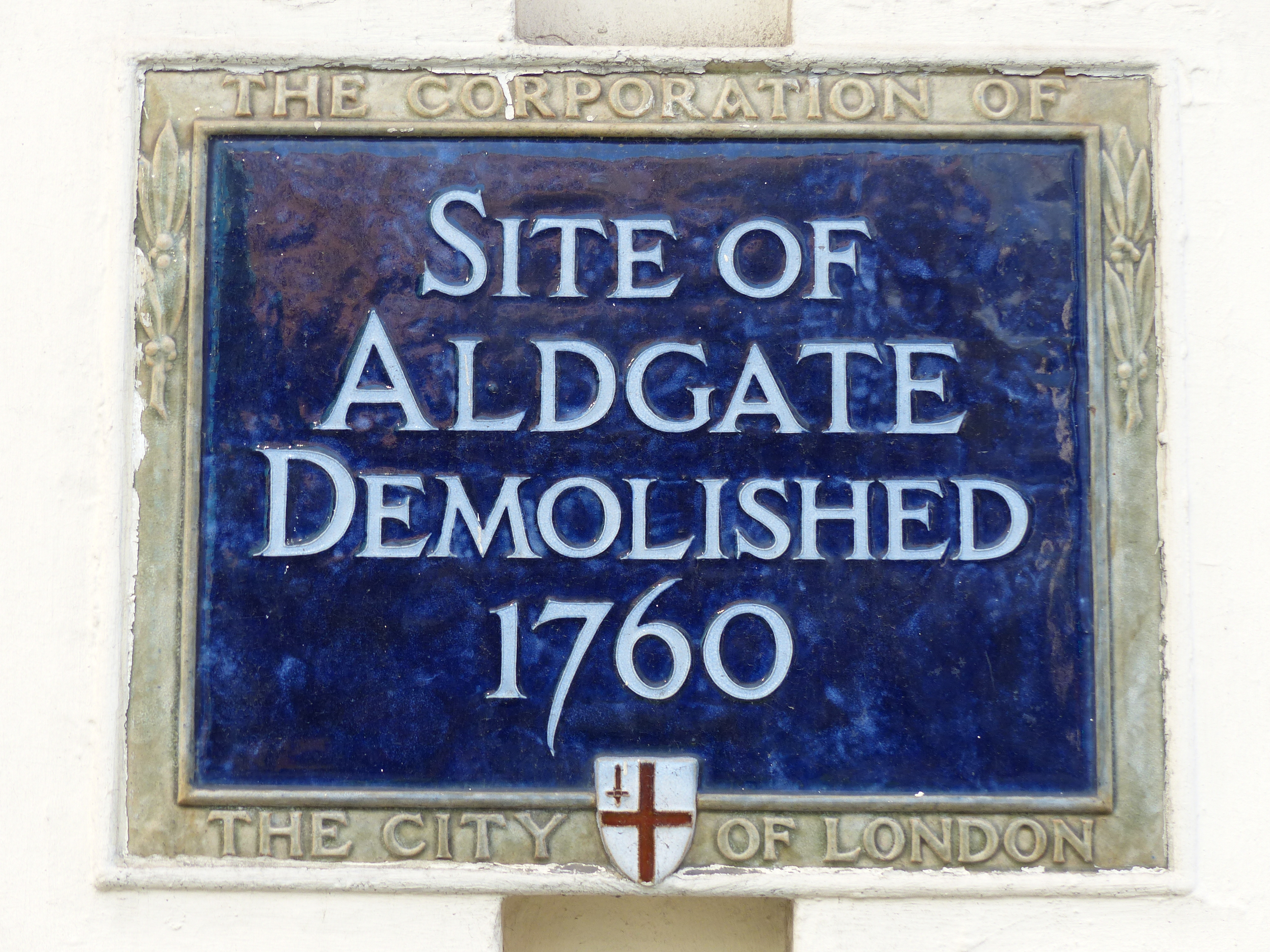
Site of Aldgate demolishing

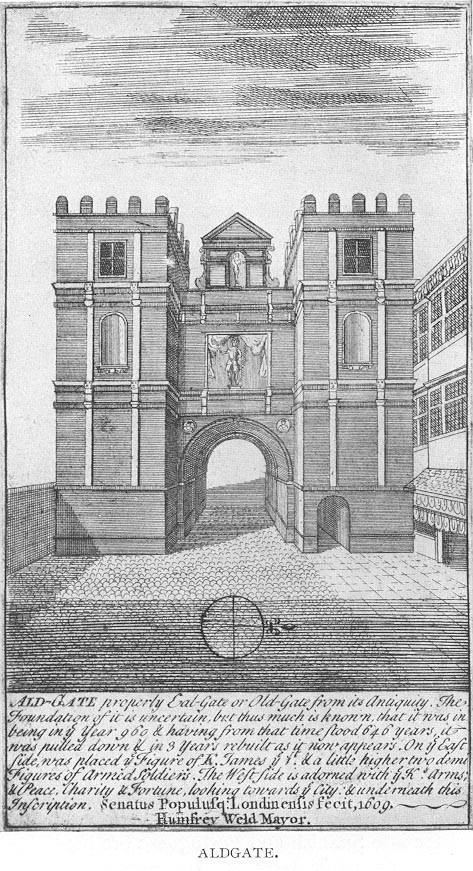
Aldgate in c. 1600

The wall from Tower Hill then runs east of Walbrook toward the second historic gate, Aldgate – Gate 2. These would have led onto the Roman road network toward Essex and East Anglia via Stratford and Colchester. In present times the roads Leadenhall Street and Fenchurch Street lead into Aldgate High Street, where the gate's foundations are buried roughly where the Jewry Street intersects. Following the wall north, it runs between what is now The Aldgate School and Aldgate Square.

==== Bishopsgate ====
From Aldgate, the wall then ran North-West toward Gate 3, Bishopsgate. The road through this would have led onto the Roman road network toward leading to Lincoln and York. The current road, the A10 going north, now goes over the foundations of this gate.

=== Northern wall section ===
==== Moorgate ====
From Bishopsgate going along the northern section of wall leads to Gate 4; Moorgate. Until 1415 this was a small postern leading into the marshy Moorfields area of Finsbury. The wet conditions were probably caused by the wall partially obstructing the flow of the Walbrook. Moorgate remained ill-connected with no direct approach road from the south until 1846, some time after the wall had been demolished. London Wall, the modern road following this section of the wall, now crosses this gate's foundations. Leading north from here are routes into Finsbury.

==== Cripplegate ====
Route to the London Charterhouse, Clerkenwell and Islington.

==== Aldersgate ====
With direct access to more local routes.

=== Western wall section ===
==== Newgate ====
High Holborn and Oxford Street, with access via the Devil's Highway to Silchester and Bath, and Watling Street to St Albans and the west midlands. These roads leading over the River Fleet.

==== Ludgate ====
Fleet Street and the Strand

== Bastions ==
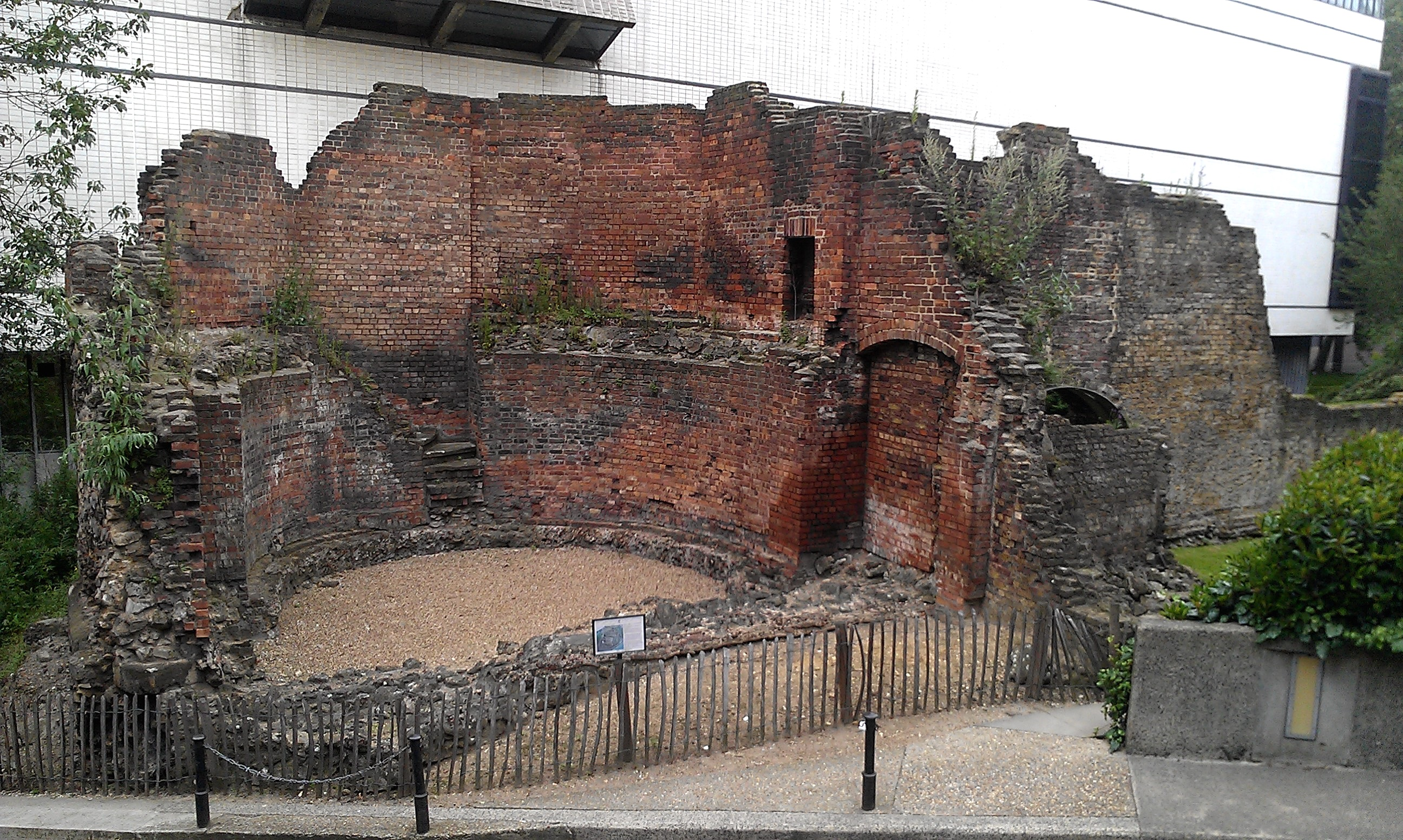
Bastion 14 in London Wall, which is overlooked by the former Museum of London, now closed prior to relocation

The bastions, towers built against the face of the city wall, are scattered irregularly across its perimeter. Not bonded to the city wall itself, they are considered to be added after the construction of the wall and even later after by post-Roman builders.

21 bastions are currently known about (more may be undiscovered). They can be grouped into:

- an eastern section from the Tower of London to Bishopsgate (B1–10),
- a single bastion west of Bishopsgate (B11), and
- a western section (B12–21). Between the eastern and western section, a gap of 731 metres (2400 feet or 800 yards) along the northern section of the city wall has no recorded bastions.

== Known monuments and landmarks ==
Location	Coordinates	Gallery	Conservation status	Notes
Tower of London	51°30′28.4″N 0°04′32.2″W	Tower of London		The Tower of London, which includes a section built on a Roman Wall foundation, is operated by Historic Royal Palaces. Open to the public on purchase of ticket.
Tower Hill gardens	51°30′35.7″N 0°04′33.7″W	London Roman Wall – surviving section by Tower Hill gardens London Roman Wall – surviving section by Tower Hill gardens cross-section London Roman Wall – surviving section by Tower Hill gardens full section	Grade I Listed Building List entry number: 1357518 Scheduled Monument List entry number: 1002063	Open to the public. 360 panoramic view of this site.
Tower Hill	51°30′38.1″N 0°04′34.1″W	London Roman Wall – surviving section by Tower Hill Tube Station	Scheduled Monument List entry number: 1002062	Partially accessible to the public. Can be accessed via a side street for a side-on view (as seen in this picture). For front-on view, access is through the privately owned citizenM Tower of London Hotel.
Basement of Roman Wall House, 1–2 Crutched Friars and Emperor House	51°30′43.8″N 0°04′35.4″W		Scheduled Monument List entry number: 1002069	No public access.
St Alphage Garden	51.5180°N 0.0926°W	Section of Roman and Medieval wall in St Alphage Garden, off London Wall.	Scheduled Monument List entry number: 1018884	Public access
London Wall underground car park	51°31′03.4″N 0°05′25.9″W	London Roman Wall – London Wall underground car park segment	Scheduled Monument List entry number: 1018885	Open to public. Access through the 24/ 7 London Wall underground car park.
London Wall underground car park	51°31′03.0″N 0°05′43.5″W	London Roman Wall - surviving section of the western gate to Cripplegate Fort	Scheduled Monument List entry number: 1018889	No public access – hidden from view.
Aldersgate Street (underneath road and pavement)	51°31′00.2″N 0°05′48.7″W		Scheduled Monument List entry number: 1018882	
Basement of the Central Criminal Court, Old Bailey	51°30′55.3″N 0°06′06.1″W		Scheduled Monument List entry number: 1018884	No public access. Potentially arranged to view through a tour within the Old Bailey.

== Related signage ==
Location	Coordinates	Gallery	Description	Notes
Tower Hill pedestrian crossing	51°30′34.1″N 0°04′33.1″W	London Roman Wall – Museum of London Walking Tour Plaque 1	Transcript of the London Wall Walk plaque 1 Transcript of tile 2 'The London Wall Walk The London Wall Walk follows the original line of the City Wall for much of its length, from the royal fortress of the Tower of London to the Museum of London, situated in the modern high-rise development of the Barbican. Between these two landmarks the Wall Walk passes surviving pieces of the Wall visible to the public and the sites of the gates now buried deep beneath the City streets. It also passes close to eight of the surviving forty-one City churches. The Walk is 1 3/4 miles (2.8 km) long and is marked by twenty-one panels which can be followed in either direction. Completion of the Walk will take between one and two hours. Wheelchairs can reach most individual sites although access is difficult at some points'. Transcript of tile 5 'For nearly fifteen hundred years the physical growth of the City of London was limited by its defensive wall. The first Wall was built by the Romans c. AD 200, one hundred and fifty years after the foundation of Londinium. It stretched for 2 miles (3.2 km), incorporating a pre-existing fort. In the 4th century, the Romans strengthened the defences with towers on the eastern section of the wall. The Roman Wall formed the foundation of the later City Wall. During the Saxon period the Wall decayed but successive medieval and Tudor rebuildings and repairs restored it as a defensive wall. With the exception of a medieval realignment in the Blackfriars' area, the Wall was no longer necessary for defence. Much of it was demolished in the 18th and 19th centuries and where sections survived they became buried under shops and warehouses. During the 20th century, several sections have been revealed by excavations and preserved'.	Open to the public.
Tower Hill gardens	51°30′35.6″N 0°04′34.5″W	London Roman Wall – Museum of London Plaque 2	Transcript of the London Wall Walk plaque 2 Transcript of tile 1 'The London Wall Walk follows the line of the City Wall from the Tower of London to the Museum of London. The Walk is 1 3/4 miles (2.8 km) long and is marked by twenty-one panels which can be followed in either direction. The City Wall was built by the Romans c AD 200. During the Saxon period it fell into decay. From the 12th to 17th centuries large sections of the Roman Wall and gates were repaired or rebuilt. From the 17th century, as London expanded rapidly in size, the Wall was no longer necessary for defence. During the 18th century demolition of parts of the Wall began, and by the 19th century, most of the Wall had disappeared. Only recently have several sections again become visible. Transcript of tile 4 'This impressive section of wall still stands to a height of 35 feet (11 m). The Roman work survives to the level of the sentry walk, 14 1/2 feet (4.4 m) high, with medieval stonework above. The Wall was constructed with coursed blocks of ragstone which sandwiched a rubble and mortar core. Layers of flat red tiles were used at intervals to give extra strength and stability. Complete with its battlements the Roman Wall would have been about 20 feet (6.1 m) high. Outside the Wall was a defensive ditch. To the north is the site of one of the towers added to the outside of the wall in the 4th century. Stone recovered from its foundations in 1852 and 1935 included part of the memorial inscription from the tomb of Julius Classicianus. the Roman Provincial Procurator (financial administrator) in AD 61. In the medieval period, the defences were repaired and heightened. The stonework was more irregular with a sentry walk only 3 feet (0.91 m) wide. To the west was the site of the Tower Hill scaffold where many famous prisoners were publicly beheaded, the last in 1747'.	Open to the public. Note: plaques 3–4 no longer exist in their original spaces as outlined by the maps on the tile within the picture.
Tower Hill gardens	51°30′35.4″N 0°04′34.0″W	London Roman Wall – English Heritage plaque by Tower Hill gardens	Transcript of the English Heritage plaque 'London Wall This is one of the most impressive surviving sections of London's former city wall. The lower part, with its characteristic tile bonding courses, was built by the Romans around 200 AD. Its purpose may have been as much to control the passage of good and people as for defence. Against its inner face on this side, the wall was reinforced by a substantial earth rampart. Outside was a wide ditch. In the far right hand corner, evidence of an internal turret was found in excavation. This probably contained a staircase giving access to the sentry walk. Complete with its battlements, the Roman wall would have been about 6.4 metres high. During the medieval period, the wall was repaired and heightened. From the 17th century, it fell into disuse and parts were demolished. Several sections, including this one, were preserved by being incorporated into later buildings. For your safety Please take care as historic sites can be hazardous. Children should be kept under close control. Wilful damage to the monument is an offence. Unauthorised use of Metal detectors is prohibited. For more information on this site. and how to join English Heritage, please contact 0171 973 3479 English Heritage'	Open to the public.
Aldgate Square	51°30′49.2″N 0°04′37.1″W	London Roman Wall – Museum of London Walking Tour Plaque 5	Transcript of the London Wall Walk plaque 5 Transcript of tile 1 'The London Wall Walk follows the line of the City Wall from the Tower of London to the Museum of London. The Walk is 1 3/4 miles (2.8 km) long and is marked by twenty-one panels which can be followed in either direction. The City Wall was built by the Romans c AD 200. During the Saxon period it fell into decay. From the 12th to 17th centuries large sections of the Roman Wall and gates were repaired or rebuilt. From the 17th century, as London expanded rapidly in size, the Wall was no longer necessary for defence. During the 18th century demolition of parts of the Wall began, and by the 19th century most of the Wall had disappeared. Only recently have several sections again become visible'. Transcript of tile 4 'Aldgate, City Gate When the Roman City Wall was built (c AD 200) a stone gate perhaps already spanned the Roman road linking London (Londinium) with Colchester (Camulodunum). The gate probably had twin entrances flanked by guard towers. Outside the gate a large cemetery developed to the south of the road. In the later 4th century the gate may have been rebuilt to provide a platform for catapults. The Roman gate apparently survived until the medieval period (called Alegate or Algate) when it was rebuilt in 1108–47, and again in 1215. Its continued importance was assured by the building of the great Priory of Holy Trinity just inside the gate. The medieval gate had a single entrance flanked by two large semi-circular towers. It was during this period that Aldgate had lived in rooms over the gate from 1374 while a customs official in the port of London. Aldgate was completely rebuilt in 1607-9 but was finally pulled down in 1761 to improve traffic access'.	Open to the public. Note: plaque 6 no longer exists in its original space as outlined by the maps on the tile within the picture.
Bevis Marks	51°30′53.3″N 0°04′44.3″W	London Roman Wall – Museum of London Walking Tour Plaque 7	Transcript of the London Wall Walk plaque 7 Transcript of tile 1 'The London Wall Walk follows the line of the City Wall from the Tower of London to the Museum of London. The Walk is 1 3/4 miles (2.8 km) long and is marked by twenty-one panels which can be followed in either direction. The City Wall was built by the Romans c AD 200. During the Saxon period it fell into decay. From the 12th to 17th centuries large sections of the Roman Wall and gates were repaired or rebuilt. From the 17th century, as London expanded rapidly in size, the Wall was no longer necessary for defence. During the 18th century demolition of parts of the Wall began, and by the 19th century most of the Wall had disappeared. Only recently have several sections again become visible'. Transcript of tile 4 'Bevis Marks, City Wall The engraving shows the area around Bevis Marks as it appeared (c 1560–70) in the reign of Elizabeth I. The City Wall, Aldgate, four towers and the City ditch can be clearly seen. Although the Wall has now disappeared in this area many of the streets still survive today. Outside the Wall were wooden tenter frames used for stretching newly woven cloth (the origin of the phrase 'to be on tenter hooks'). A gun foundry can also be seen near St Botolph's Church at the end of Houndsditch. Beyond were open fields (Spital Fields) stretching towards the villages of Shoreditch and Whitechapel. The historian John Stow, writing c 1580, recorded the many unsuccessful attempts to prevent the City ditch becoming a dumping ground for rubbish including the dead dogs, which gave Houndsditch its name. In the 17th century the ditch was finally filled in and the area used for gardens'.	Open to the public. Note: plaques 8–10 no longer exist in their original spaces as outlined by the maps on the tile within the picture.
Moorgate		London Roman Wall – Museum of London Walking Tour Plaque 11 London Roman Wall – Museum of London Walking Tour Plaque 11	Transcript of the London Wall Walk plaque 11 Transcript of tile 1 'The London Wall Walk follows the line of the City Wall from the Tower of London to the Museum of London. The Walk is 1 3/4 miles (2.8 km) long and is marked by twenty-one panels which can be followed in either direction. The City Wall was built by the Romans c AD 200. During the Saxon period it fell into decay. From the 12th to 17th centuries large sections of the Roman Wall and gates were repaired or rebuilt. From the 17th century, as London expanded rapidly in size, the Wall was no longer necessary for defence. During the 18th century demolition of parts of the Wall began, and by the 19th century most of the Wall had disappeared. Only recently have several sections again become visible. Tile 5 'Mooregate, Cite Gate. Moorgate was the only gate whose name described its location as it gave access to the moor or marsh which stretched along the northern side of the city. In the early Roman period the area was well-drained by the Walbrook stream by the construction of the City Wall (c AD 200) impeded the natural drainage and caused the formation of a large marsh outside the Wall. There was no Roman gate here but in the Middle Ages a small gate was built. In 1415 it was totally rebuilt by the Mayor Thomas Falconer and the engraving shows it after substantial rebuilding as a single gate, flanked by towers. Throughout the 16th century attempts were made to drain the marsh and within a hundred years the whole area had been laid out with walks and avenues of trees. In 1672 Moorgate was rebuilt as an imposing ceremonial entrance. This was demolished to improve traffic access in 1761. The City Wall to the east became incorporated into the Bethlehem Hospital (Bedlam) for the insane. This long stretch of the Wall was finally demolished in 1817.	Open to the public. Note: plaques 12 no longer exists in its original space as outlined by the maps on the tile within the picture.
		London Wall – plaque by St Alphage Gardens London Wall – plaque of the wall by St Alphage Gardens		Open to the public.
		London Roman Wall – Museum of London Walking Tour Plaque 13 London Roman Wall – Museum of London Walking Tour Plaque 13		Open to the public.
		London Roman Wall – Museum of London Walking Tour Plaque 14 London Roman Wall – Museum of London Walking Tour Plaque 14		Open to the public.
		London Roman Wall – Museum of London Walking Tour Plaque 15		Open to the public. Note: plaques 16–17 no longer exist in their original spaces as outlined by the maps on the tile within the picture.
London Wall underground car park	51°31′03.6″N 0°05′43.4″W	London Roman Wall – Museum of London Walking Tour Plaque 18	Transcript of the London Wall Walk plaque 18 Transcript of tile 1 'The London Wall Walk follows the line of the City Wall from the Tower of London to the Museum of London. The Walk is 1 3/4 miles (2.8 km) long and is marked by twenty-one panels which can be followed in either direction. The City Wall was built by the Romans c AD 200. During the Saxon period it fell into decay. From the 12th to 17th centuries large sections of the Roman Wall and gates were repaired or rebuilt. From the 17th century, as London expanded rapidly in size, the Wall was no longer necessary for defence. During the 18th century demolition of parts of the Wall began, and by the 19th century most of the Wall had disappeared. Only recently have several sections again become visible'. Transcript of tile 4 'Prior to the construction of the western section of the road London Wall in 1959, excavations revealed the west gate of the Roman fort, built c AD 120. It had twin entrance ways flanked on either side by square towers. Only the northern tower can now be seen. It provided a guardroom and access to the sentry walk along the Wall. Large blocks of sandstone formed the base, some weighing over half a ton (500 kg). The remaining masonry consisted of ragstone brought from Kent. The guardroom opened on to a gravel road, spanning the gates. Each passage was wide enough for a cart and had a pair of heavy wooden doors. Running northwards from the gate-tower is the fort wall, 4 feet (1.2 m) thick with the internal thickening added when the fort was incorporated into the Roman city defences c AD 200. The gate was eventually blocked, probably in the troubled years of the later 4th century. By the medieval period the site of the gate had been completely forgotten'.	Open to the public. Note: plaques 19–20 no longer exist in their original spaces as outlined by the maps on the tile within the picture.
		London Roman Wall – Noble Street New Plaque		Open to the public.
Aldergate Street – upon the back walls of Alder Castle House, 10 Noble St, London EC2V 7JU	51°31′00.5″N 0°05′48.6″W	London Roman Wall – Museum of London Walking Tour Plaque 21		Open to public.

== See also ==
- Fortifications of London
- List of cities with defensive walls
- List of town walls in England and Wales
- Scheduled monuments in Greater London
