= St Alphage Garden =

Coordinates: 51.5180°N 0.0926°W

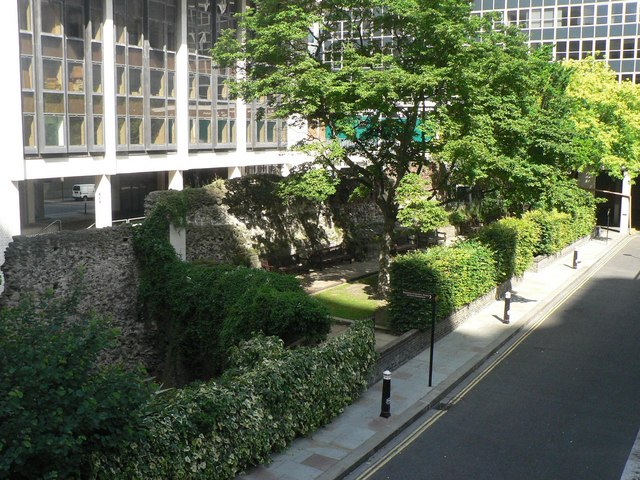
St Alphage Garden

St Alphage Garden is an urban garden in the City of London, off London Wall. It was converted from the former churchyard of St Alphage London Wall in 1872. The north edge of the garden is defined by a section of the ancient London Wall, which was built below the current street level between 190 and 225 AD and was crenellated in 1477 during the Wars of the Roses. A lowered, paved extension to the garden lies to the west, accessed by a gate and a flight of steps. Both sections of the garden hold flower beds and benches. The main garden is mostly grass, with a magnolia tree and an oak tree. The southern edge of the garden is defined by a beech hedge. On the other side of the Wall lies the private Salters' Garden.
