= St Alphege London Wall =

Former church-site in London

Coordinates: 51°31′3.57″N 0°5′32.03″W

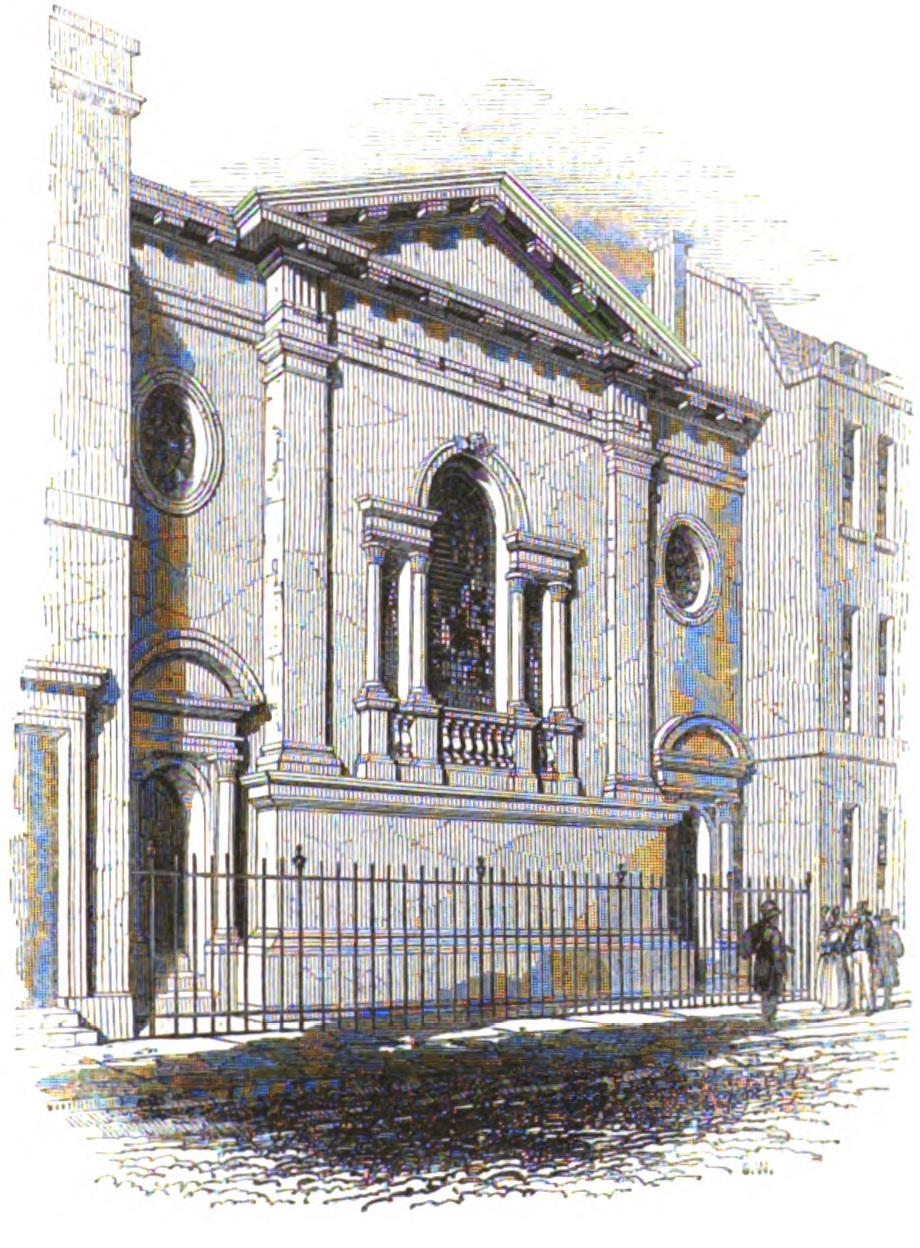
- St Alphege London Wall
- Location: London
- Country: England
- Denomination: Anglican

Architecture
- Style: Gothic; Baroque

St Alphege or St Alphage London Wall was a church in Bassishaw Ward in the City of London, built directly upon London Wall. It was also known as St Alphege Cripplegate, from its proximity to Cripplegate. It is now operated as St Alphage Garden.

== History ==
The parish of St Alphege used two churches successively, moving from its original building to a former priory church nearby after the Dissolution of the Monasteries.

=== Original site ===
The first church was built adjoining the London Wall, with the wall forming its northern side. The churchyard lay to the north of the wall. The earliest mention of this church dates to c. 1108–25, though it is said that it was established before 1068. The church was closed by Act of Parliament at the end of the sixteenth century, and demolished. The London Wall was left standing. The site of the church became a carpenter's yard. In 1837 it was laid out as a public garden, which remains today, with a preserved section of the London Wall on its north edge. After the realignment of the road London Wall, that section formerly running past the site of this church was renamed St Alphege Gardens.

The churchyard to the north of the London Wall was still open in 1677, but was subsequently built over. The last building on the site, using the London Wall as its southern boundary, was destroyed by bombing in the Second World War. This exposed the Roman city wall, on which the medieval wall had been built. When a new Salters' Hall—which was opened in 1976—was built on the site, the area north of the London Wall was made into a garden for the Hall.

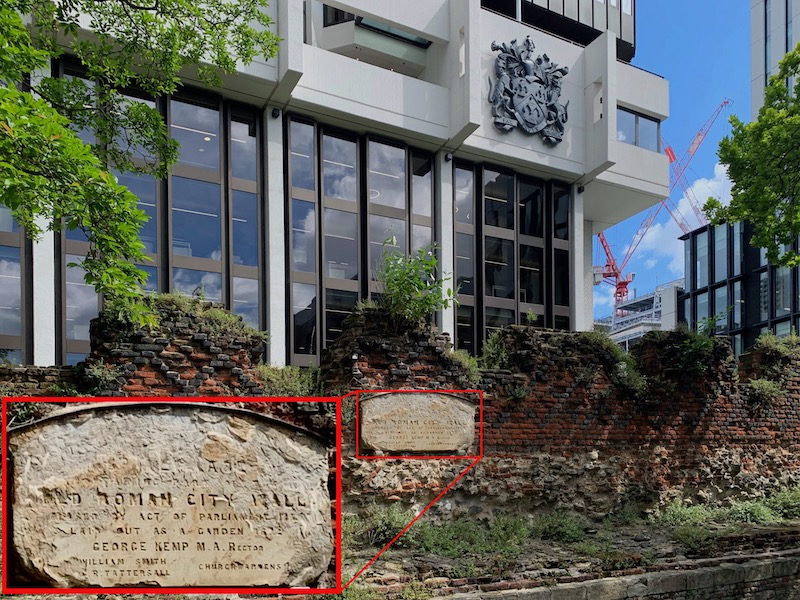
The site of the lost Elsing Spital Priory

=== Priory church ===
The second church began as the Priory Church of the (probably Benedictine) nunnery of St Mary-within-Cripplegate. This was probably founded before 1000, but by 1329 the community had fallen into decay. The land passed into the hands of William Elsing, who founded a hospital on the site, Elsing Spital, in 1331. Originally a secular establishment, it was taken over by Augustinian canons in 1340. The hospital closed in 1536, with the Dissolution of the Monasteries.

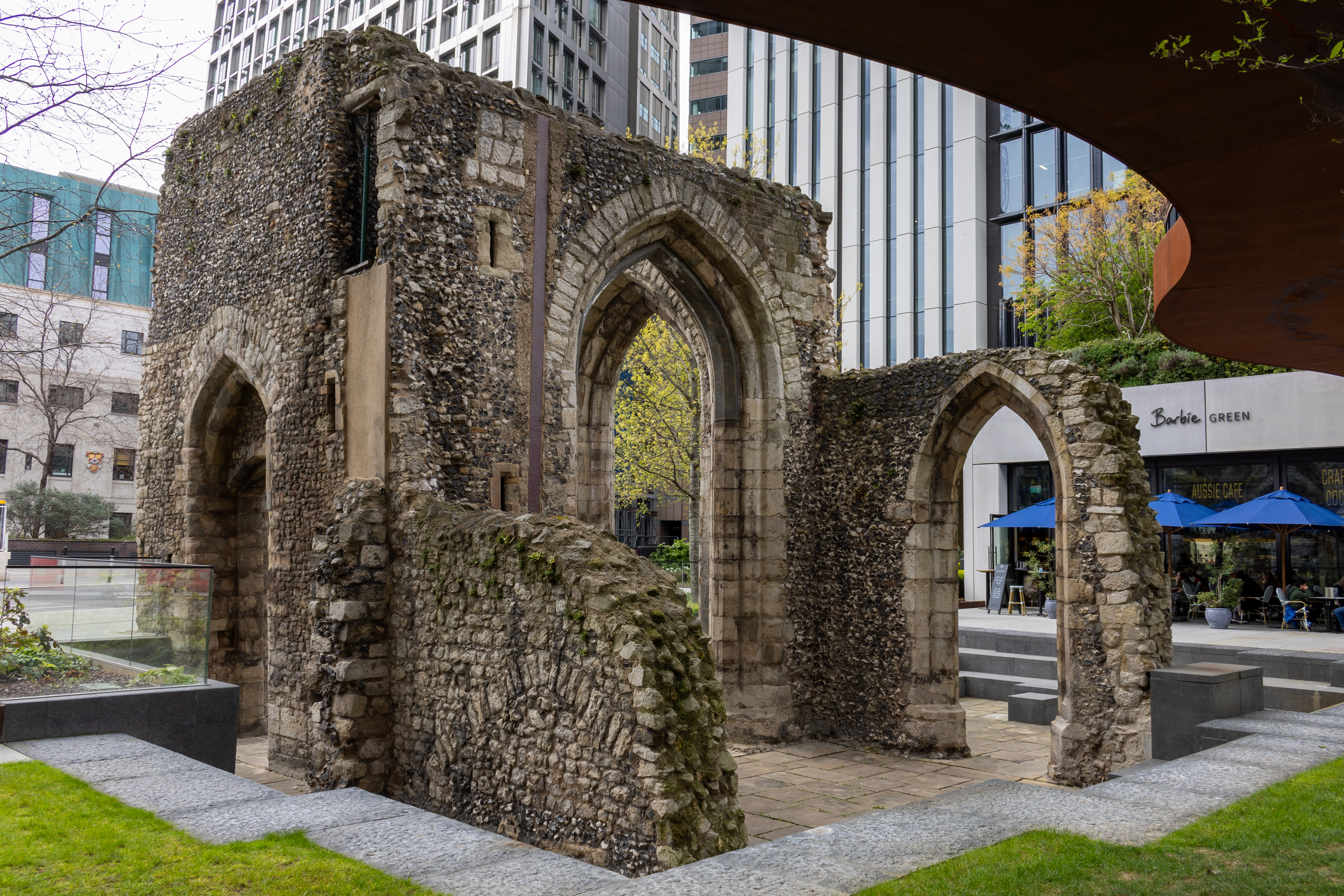
Remains of the medieval tower.

After the closure of the original Church of St Alphege, the Priory Church became the new Parish Church. The rest of the Spital site was sold to Sir John Williams, who built a private house in its grounds, which was destroyed by fire in 1541. The property was subsequently sold on, and used for the foundation of Sion College in 1630. The church was repaired in 1624, and the upper part of the steeple rebuilt in 1649. It was damaged, but not destroyed, in the Great Fire of 1666.

Further repairs were made in 1684 and 1701. The parishioners applied in 1711 to the Commission for Building Fifty New Churches for funds to enlarge the building, and in 1718 petitioned Parliament for funds; neither initiative proved successful. The steeple was in such a condition by 1747 that the bells could not be rung, and four of the six were sold.

=== Rebuilding ===
In 1774 the church was found to be unfit for use, and a committee was set up to arrange its rebuilding. This was done at a cost of £1350, retaining the tower. The new church was opened on 24 July 1777.

The rebuilt church had two fronts; an eastern one in Aldermanbury, and one to the north facing London Wall. George Godwin described them as "both equally remarkable for want of taste in the arrangement, and of beauty in the effect". The east front had a Venetian window between two pilasters, elevated on a basement; this arrangement was flanked by two doorways. The door and window surrounds and pilasters were stone, the rest brick. The façade to London Wall had two Doric columns, flattened against the wall, supporting an entablature and pediment. Between the columns was a doorway, its lobby leading into the medieval tower. The interior of the body of the church was described by Godwin as "merely a plain room with a flat ceiling, crossed from north to south by one large band at the east end". The pulpit was, unconventionally, placed against the west wall, so that the congregation faced away from the altar.

By 1900, the tower and porch were again in a poor state, and the north entrance was rebuilt with a neo-Gothic façade in 1913.

The church was damaged in an air raid in the First World War. The Parish was amalgamated with that of St Mary Aldermanbury in 1917. The church was rebuilt in 1919, but was scheduled for demolition in the same year. The bells went to St Peter’s Acton. The nave was demolished in 1923, leaving the tower and the porch. Until the Second World War, the tower was maintained with an altar and chairs as a place for prayer.

The tower was gutted by fire in 1940. The City of London Corporation began to redevelop the badly bombed area in 1958, as part of the new Barbican complex. In the course of the development, the early twentieth-century north porch and the upper levels of the tower were removed. During 2018 and 2019 as part of a programme to install a raised walkway the remaining parts of the church tower and area around it were renewed to form a central feature in a new plaza named London Wall Place & St Alphage Gardens.

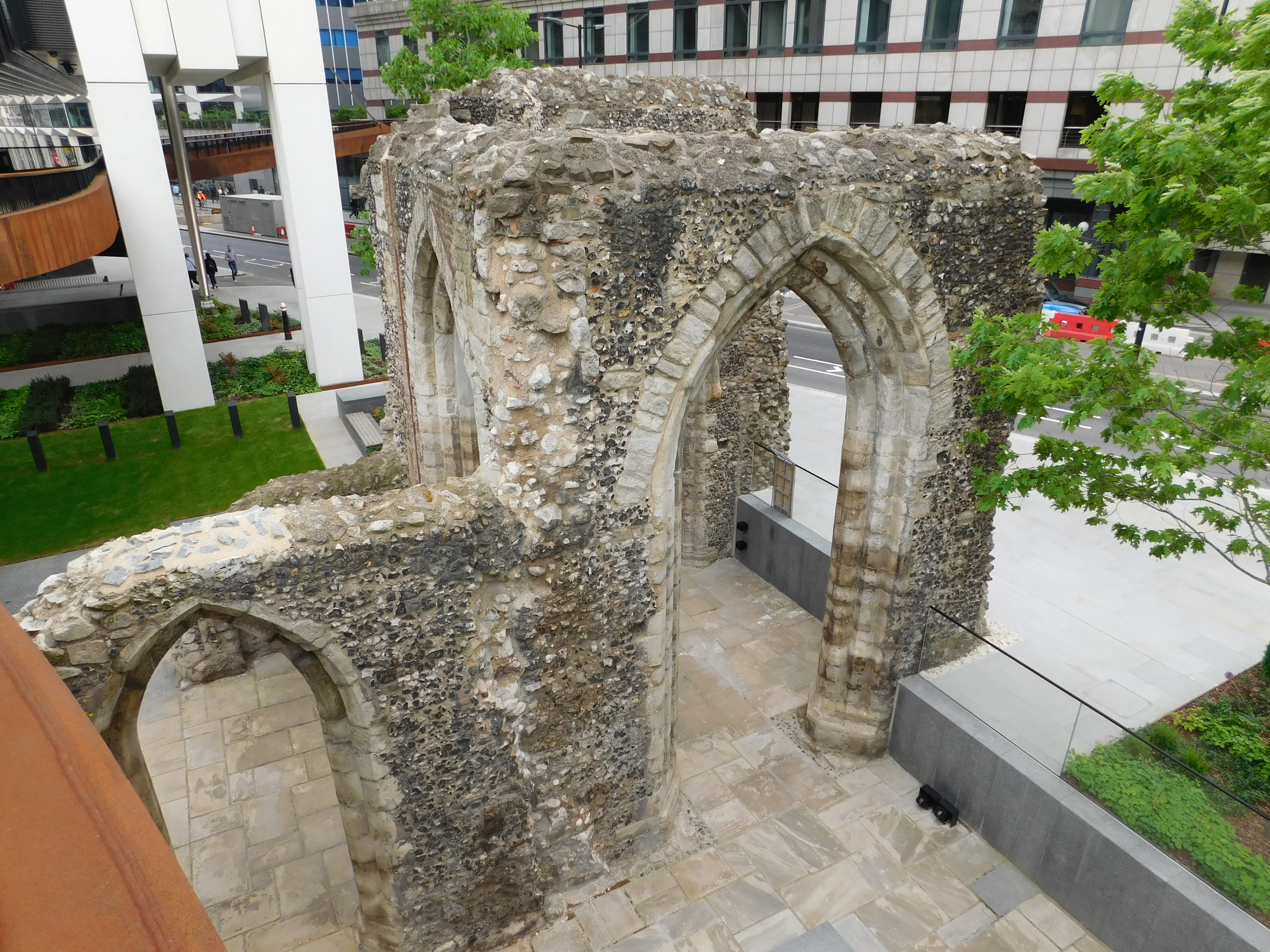
The restored tower viewed from pedestrian walkway.

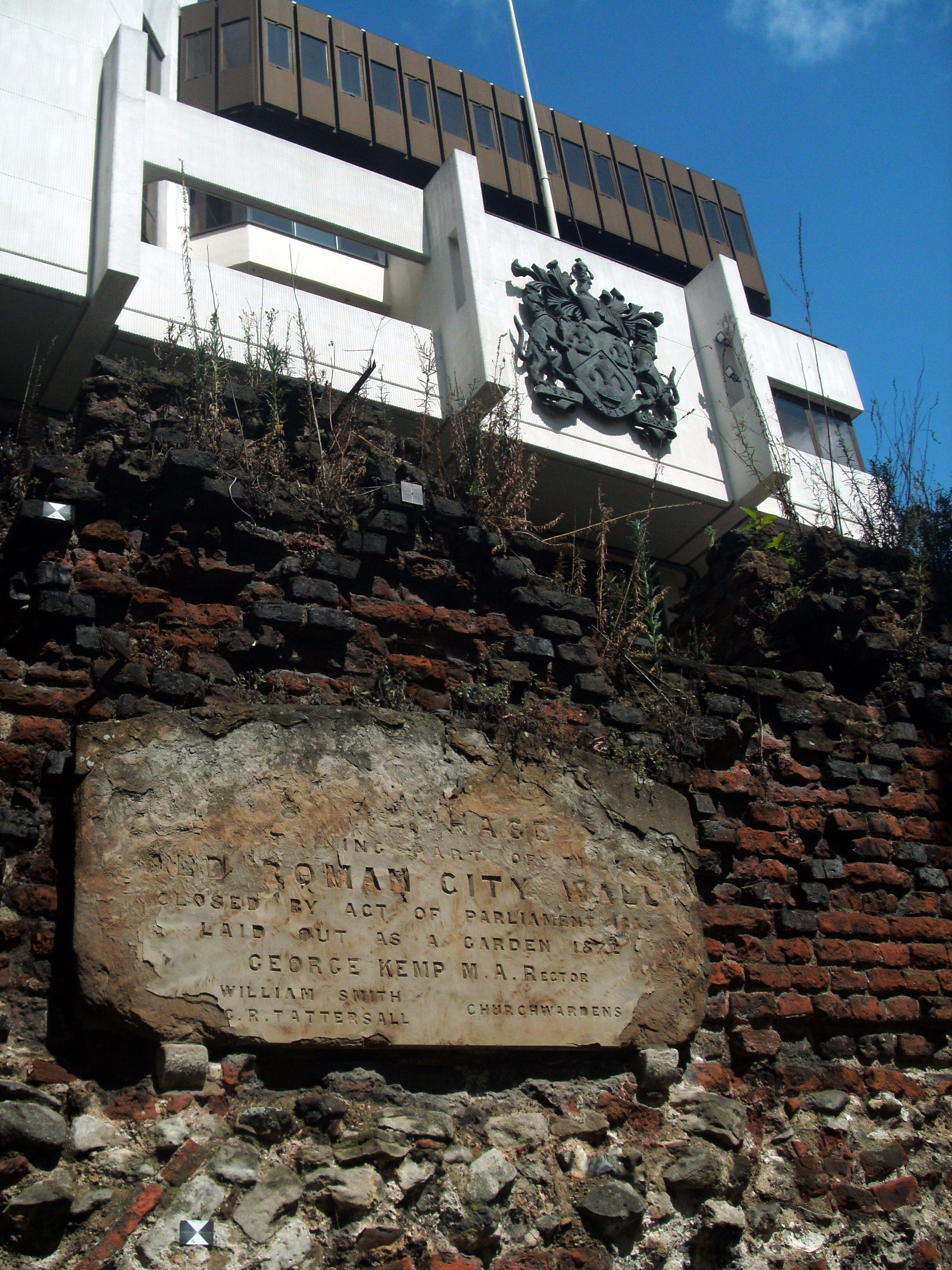
A plaque from the churchyard's conversion to a public garden in 1872.

The remains of the church were designated a Grade II listed structure on 4 January 1950. The surviving remnants of these consist of the ruin of a central tower, built of flint and rubble masonry, with arches on three sides; the south wall is missing.

For illustrations of the church in its various phases, see

In 1954, the amalgamated Parish was united with St Giles-without-Cripplegate.
