= Postern =

Secondary door or gate in a fortification

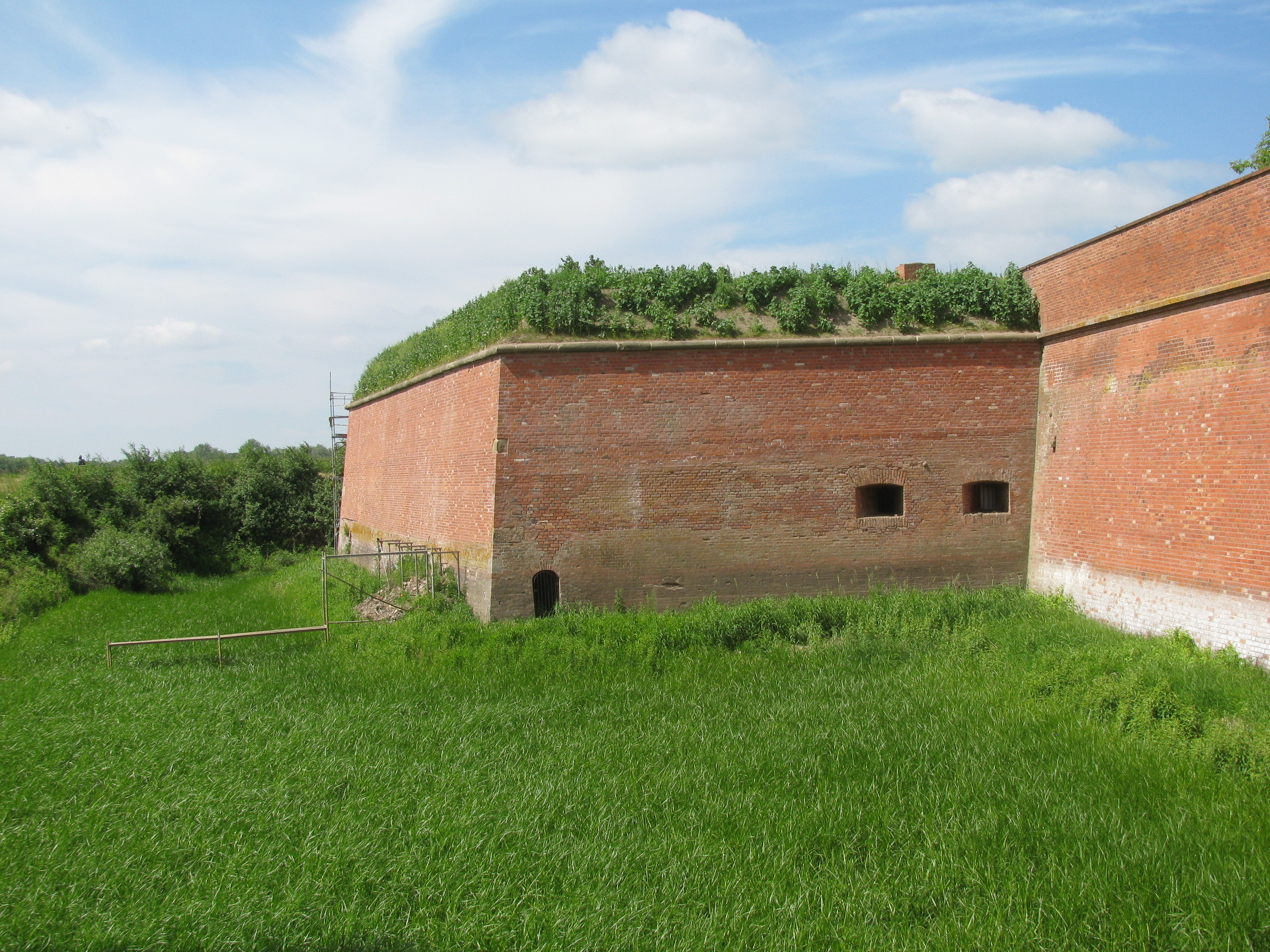
Postern doubling as a sallyport in the flank of a bastion at Dömitz Fortress in Germany

A postern is a secondary door or gate in a fortification such as a city wall or castle curtain wall. Posterns were often placed in concealed locations, allowing inconspicuous entrance and exit. In the event of a siege, a postern could act as a sally port, allowing defenders to make a sortie on the besiegers. Placed in a less exposed, less visible location, they were usually relatively small, and therefore easily defensible.

== Tactical use ==
Posterns were one of the essential means of ensuring safe communication between the enceinte and the outerworks of a defensive fortification. An 1850 West Point course summary on permanent fortifications discusses the placement and construction of posterns.

== Examples ==
- In 1896, C.R. Condor, writing for the London Palestine Pilgrims' Text Society viewed Zion Gate in Jerusalem, built west of one of the city's medieval main gates, as a likely postern. Also mentioned were the postern of St. Lazarus, west of the Damascus Gate; the postern of the Tanners' Gate; and the postern of the Madeleine at Herod's Gate. Right of the Golden Gate is a small postern called the Gate of Jehosaphat.
- The city walls of York contained a number of posterns; at North Street Tower, the postern gate was demolished to accommodate the Great North of England Railway. The tower still stands. There were also posterns at Fishergate, and Longwalk. Around 1672, the Castlegate postern was made wide enough for carriages. The fourteenth-century Layerthorpe Bridge, a crossing of the Foss, adjacent to the King's Pool, was once attached to a postern in the city wall, known as Layerthorpe Postern. The original Skeldergate postern was only large enough to allow pedestrian traffic to and from the city.
- In Oxford, there was a postern in the east city wall called Windsore Postern. There were at least three posterns in the wall at New College Gardens.
- The Tower Hill Postern was a small fortified entrance at the eastern terminal point to the London Wall, at the junction of the Wall and the Tower of London moat. In the early 17th century the City and the Crown contested ownership of the postern as part of a Tower boundary dispute. Moorgate was built by upgrading a postern built in 1415, and enlarged in 1472 and 1511.

== Literature ==
In literature, a postern features in the Le Chanson de Girart de Roussillon, where the hero makes use of one to escape when betrayed; as does Renaud de Montauban in the chanson de geste The Four Sons of Aymon. A postern also provided a safe retreat for Ogier the Dane.

In Thomas Malory's Le Morte d'Arthur, "La Cote de Male Tayle" is rescued at the Castle Orgulous when a damsel slips through the postern to find his horse and ties it to the postern so that La Cote de Male Tayle can escape the hundred knights assailing him.

The term is occasionally used in other contexts referring to a secondary door placed after a main entrance.

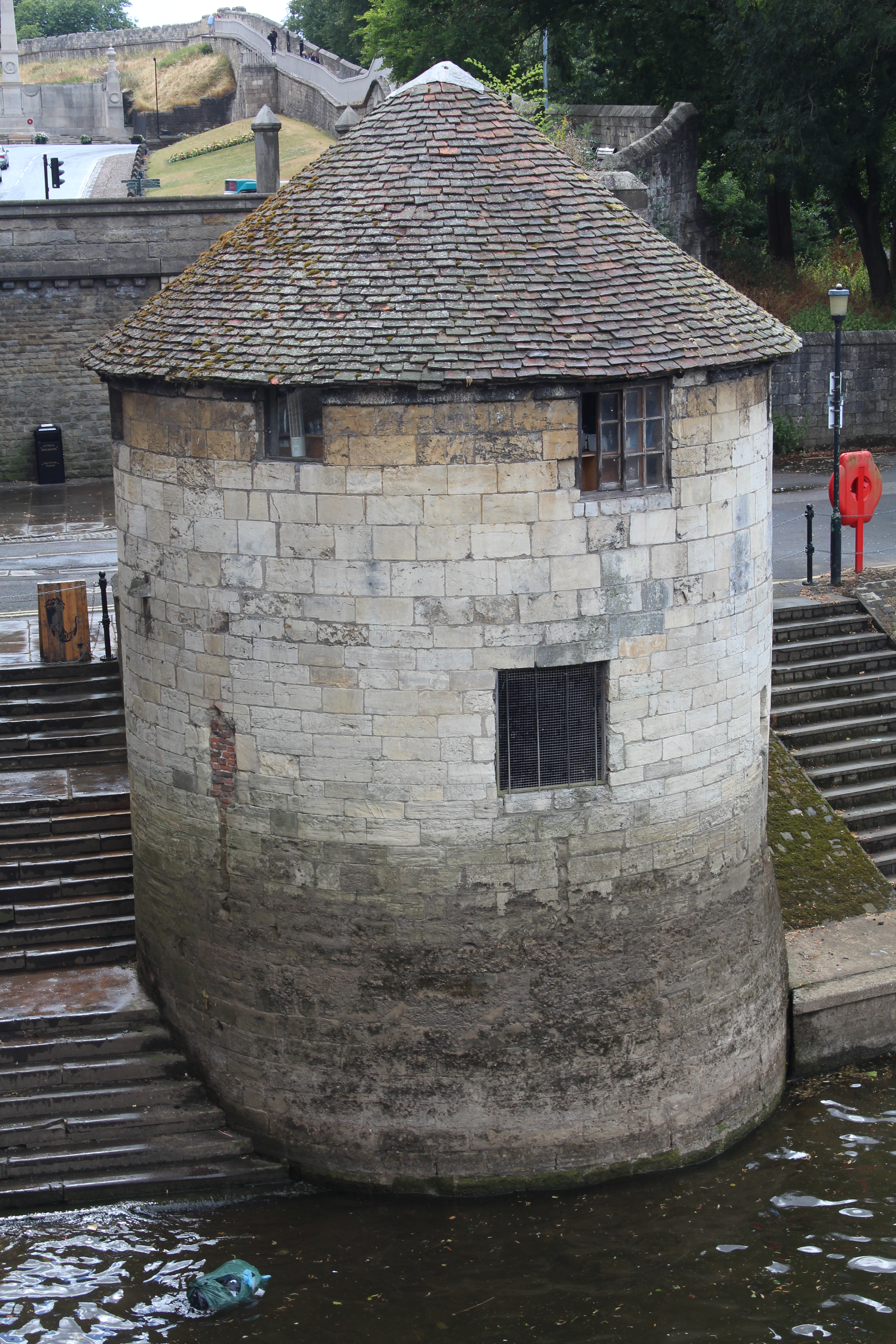
North Street Postern Tower (aka Barker Tower), York

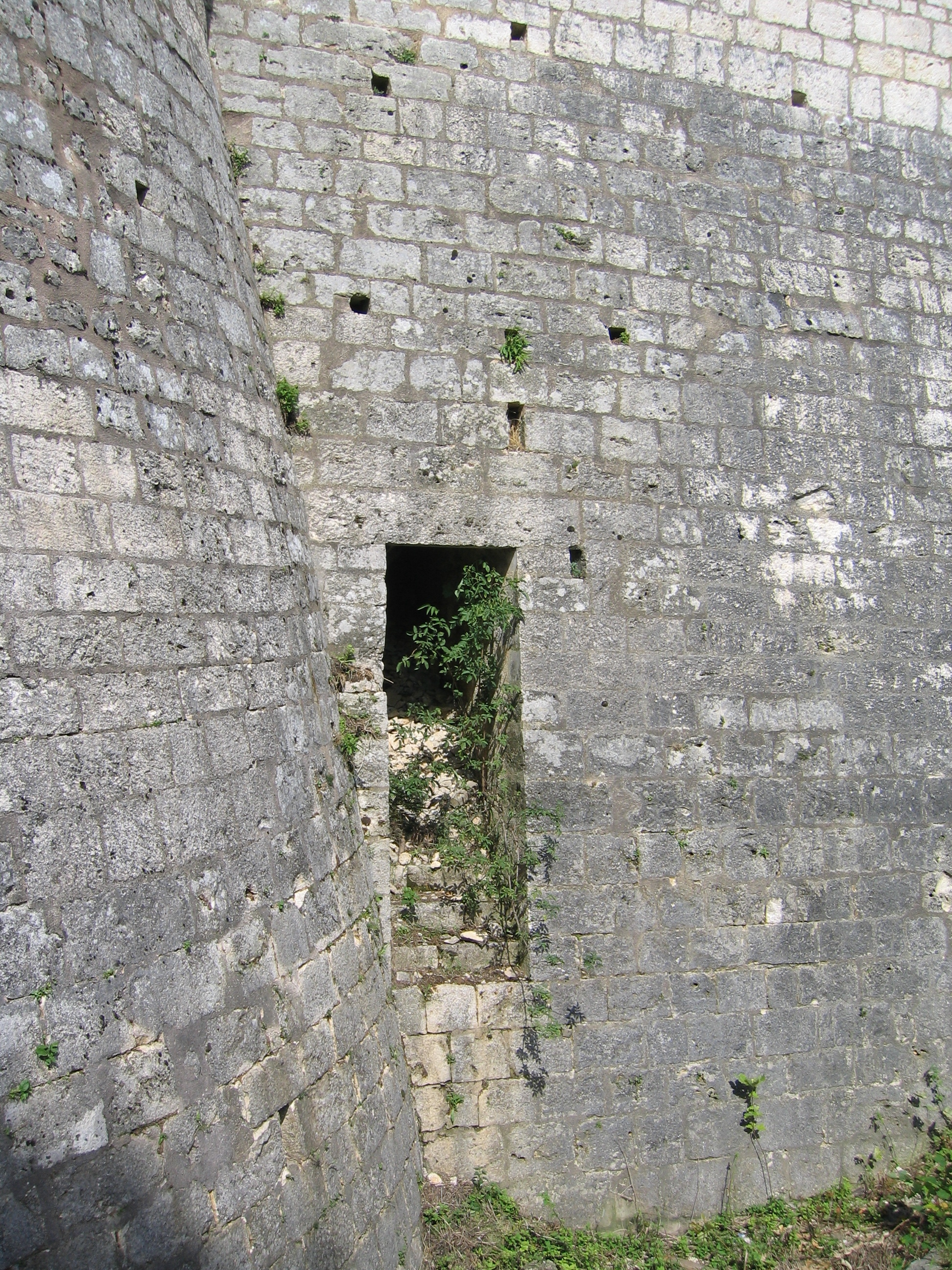
Postern in the rampart of Provins, Seine-et-Marne, France

== See also ==
- Sally port
