= Blomfield Street =

Street in the City of London

Coordinates: 51.51721°N 0.08511°W

Blomfield Street is a road in the City of London, close to Liverpool Street railway station. It was known as Broker Row, until 1860, when it was renamed in honour of former Bishop of London, Charles Blomfield, who had previously been rector of the local parish church of St Botolph-without-Bishopsgate.

The street was built along the course of a part of the River Walbrook known as the Deepditch. Although the Walbrook is now culverted and runs beneath the street, the land on each side observably dips towards the course of the river.

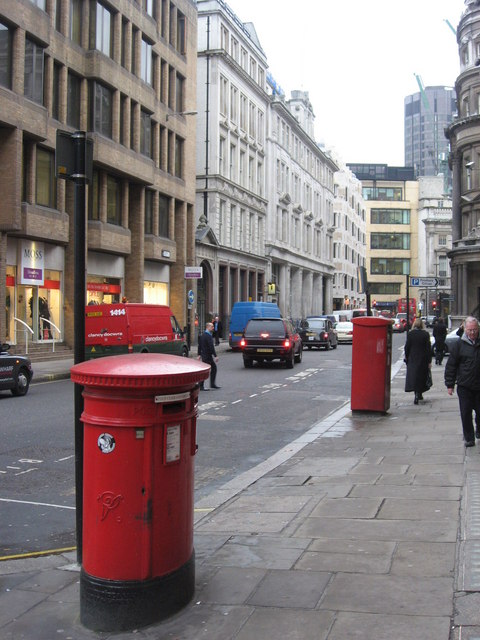
Blomfield Street

== Setting ==
The street extends in a SSW-NNE direction from its junction with the road London Wall in the south to Broad Street Place in the north.

The street forms the boundary between the Bishopsgate Without (to the east) and Coleman Street Ward (to the west) areas of the City of London.

The side streets are Liverpool Street and New Broad Street on the eastern side, and Finsbury Circus to the west. The western side of the street is in the Finsbury Circus Conservation area and includes a number of listed buildings.

== History ==
=== Walbrook ===
The street covers a section of the River Walbrook once known as the Deepditch. The river passed under the City's defensive wall (demolished in the 1760s) at a point immediately north of Blomfield Street's junction with the street London Wall, which runs parallel and just inside the course of the former wall which gave it its name.

Until the early 19th century the river - and subsequent street - was on the edge of the London built-up area; with the developed East End neighbourhood of Bishopsgate Without on the east side, and the open Moorfields area on the west side of the river and subsequent street. The open Moorfields area was historically part of the Manor of Finsbury, before becoming part of the City of London's Coleman Street Ward, and subsequently being developed around 1817, as Finsbury Circus.

The Deepditch was a canalised section of the Walbrook. When freshly dug, the ditch was steeply cut with flat base and measured approximately 10m wide by 1.7m deep, at its greatest extent. The London Wall partially dammed the river, leading to marshy conditions on Moorfields. As only part of the flow could pass through the duct under the Wall, the excess water help flood the Moor Ditch, the section of the City Ditch (the defensive ditch on the outer side of the London Wall) between the originally Roman Bishopsgate and the area where the much newer Moorgate would be built, around 1415..

The Deepditch may have been first canalised when the City Ditch was cut, around 1212. This initial work, and a recut around 1415, appears to have had a twofold purpose, to improve the city's defences and also to help drain Moorfields.

This section of the Walbrook was the main focus of the Walbrook Skulls phenomena where very large numbers of skulls were found in the bed of the river over many centuries.

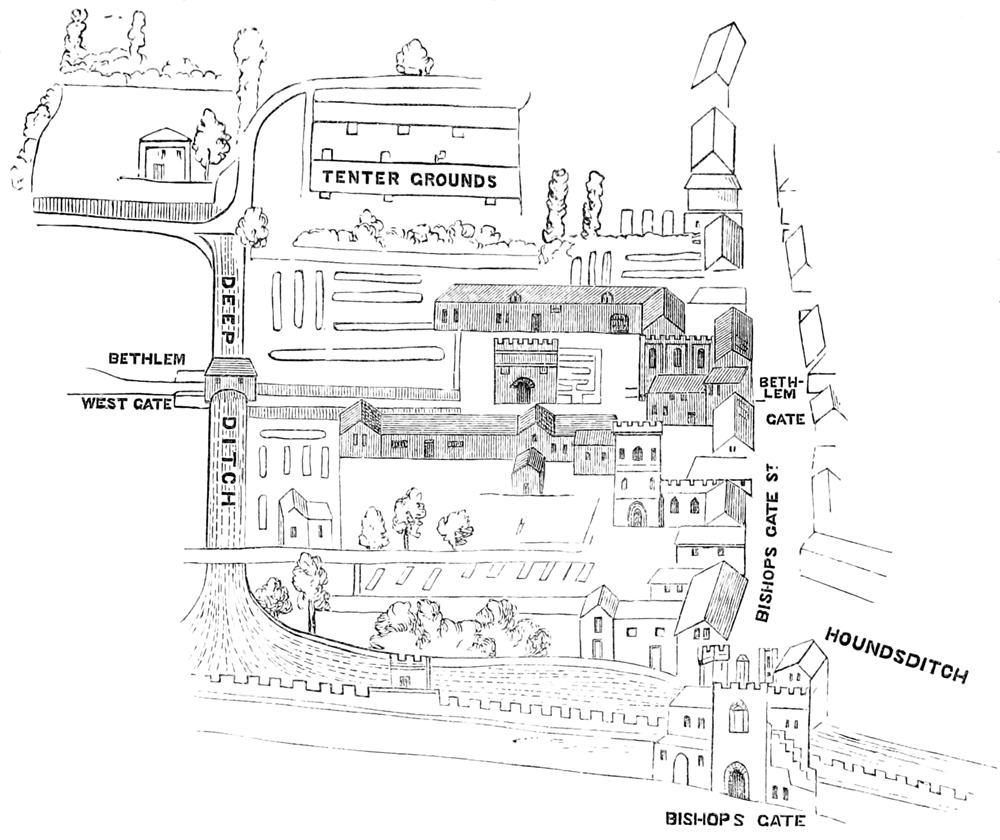
Plan of the first Bethlem Hospital, on the east side of the Walbrook (Deepditch). Blomfield Street has since been built over the course of the Deepditch

=== The street covers the river ===
In 1568, William Stow described the Deepditch as being partially filled with all kinds of refuse; "unsavoury things" which restricted the ditch to a narrow channel, and which was in danger of "impoysoning the whole Cittie". Maps in the late 17th century (Faithorne and Newcourt 1658, William Morgan 1682) show Broker Row in place instead of the river.

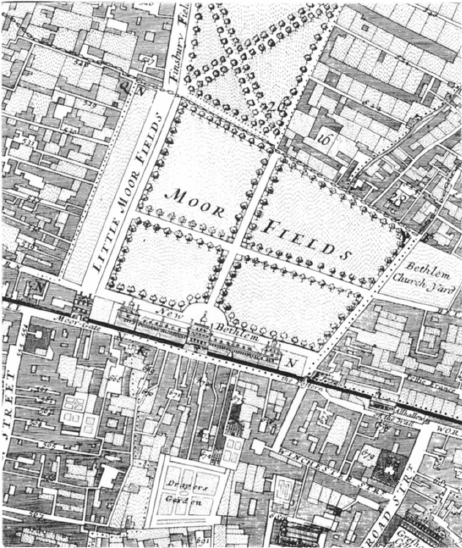
William Morgan map of 1682. London Wall and the local administrative boundaries are marked. The area to the east or Moorfields (Bishopsgate Without and Shoreditch) is developed. The Walbrook (Deepditch) immediately east of Moorfields, is culverted by this time and Broker Row (now Blomfield Street) laid out along its course. The second Bethlem Hospital is shown to the west of the street.

=== Renamed as Blomfield Street ===
The street was called Broker Row until 1860, but was renamed in honour of the recently deceased Bishop of London, Charles Blomfield, who had been rector of St Botolph-without-Bishopsgate (the parish church of Bishopsgate Without), earlier in his career. As bishop, Blomfield had campaigned against the impact of the building of the capital's new railway terminii, which had led to the displacement of huge numbers of people, especially the poor who, as tenants, received no compensation while their landlords did. One example of this was the nearby Bishopsgate railway station which opened in 1840. As well as losing their homes, the displaced poor had had to travel further to reach their place of work, or pay more rent to live close to it.

Soon after the street was renamed two new stations were built adjacent to Blomfield Street. The development of adjacent Liverpool Street Station (opened in 1878) led to thousands of East Enders losing their homes; 3,000 in the parish of St Botolph-without-Bishopsgate (known as Bishopsgate Without for civil purposes) and 7,000 in Shoreditch. Others were displaced by the creation of adjacent Broad Street Station which opened in 1865.

=== Medicine ===
The original Bethlem (or Bedlam) Hospital was sited on the east side of the river from 1243 to 1676, when it moved to a larger site in Moorfields. the new building extended for 150 metres along the north side of the London Wall. The hospital subsequently moved to Southwark around 1815, when the site, together with the rest of the Lower Moorfields was developed and replaced with the new Finsbury Circus development.

In the early and mid 19th century, before Harley Street rose to prominence, Finsbury (to the west of the street), was London's foremost medical district. Blomfield Street (then Broker Row) had the second Bethlem Hospital (until 1815), while the second site of the Moorfields Eye Hospital occupied a part of the Finsbury Circus development from 1822 to 1899.

=== World War One ===
On the night of 8/9 September 1915, during World War One, German Navy airship L13 (LZ45) carried out what would be the most destructive raids of the war. Twenty-two people were killed, including three at Blomfield Street. A number 35A bus at the junction of Blomfield and Liverpool Streets suffered a direct hit, kiling the conductor and two passengers. The driver was seen wandering the street in shock, staring at his hand which had several fingers missing.

The airship, which was 163 metres long and flying at 2500 metres of altitude, was largely invulnerable to defensive measures at this stage of the war. An eyewitness described catching sight of the airship:

"I looked up, and at the last moment the searchlight caught the Zepp, full and clear It was a beautiful but terrifying sight."

— Alfred Grolsch, eye witness,
