= Bishopsgate =

Ward and area of the City of London

Coordinates: 51°30′58″N 0°04′54″W

- Ward
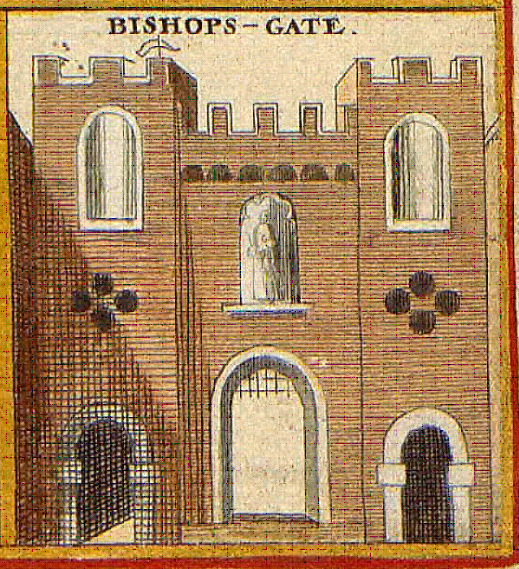
- A c. 1650 print of the gate

- Location within Greater London
- Bishopsgate ward boundaries since 2013
- Population: 222 (2011 Census Ward)
- OS grid reference: TQ330813
- Sui generis: City of London
- Administrative area: Greater London
- Region: London
- Country: England
- Sovereign state: United Kingdom
- Post town: LONDON
- Postcode district: EC2
- Dialling code: 020
- Police: City of London
- Fire: London
- Ambulance: London
- UK Parliament: Cities of London and Westminster
- London Assembly: City and East

Bishopsgate was one of the eastern gates in London's former defensive wall. The gate's name is traditionally attributed to Earconwald, who was Bishop of London in the 7th century. It was first built in Roman times and marked the beginning of Ermine Street, the ancient road running from London to York (Eboracum). The gate was rebuilt twice in the 15th and 18th centuries, but was permanently demolished in 1760.

Bishopsgate gives its name to one of the 25 wards of the City of London, with the City forming the historic and financial centre of Greater London, England. The Ward of Bishopsgate is traditionally divided into Bishopsgate Within, inside the line of the former wall, and Bishopsgate Without beyond it. Bishopsgate Without is described as part of London's East End. The ancient boundaries of the City wards were reviewed in 1994 and 2013, so that the wards no longer correspond very closely to their historic extents. Bishopsgate Without gained a significant part of Shoreditch from the London Borough of Hackney, while nearly all of Bishopsgate Within was transferred to other wards.

Bishopsgate is also the name of the street, being the part of the originally Roman Ermine Street (now the A10) within the traditional extent of the Ward.

== The gate ==
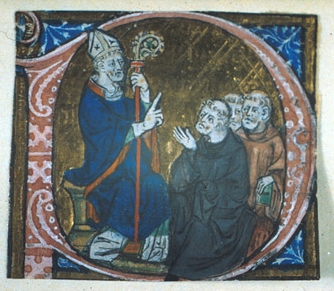
St Erkenwald, Saxon Prince, bishop and saint known as the "Light of London": Bishopsgate is thought to be named after him, and he is understood to have restored the gate

The City of London's ancient wards, before the boundary changes of 1994 and 2013

The gate was first built in the Roman era, probably at the time the wall was first built. The road though the gate, Ermine Street (known at this point as Bishopsgate) was in place long before the wall and the gate.

The gate is traditionally held to be named after Earconwald, a 7th-century Bishop of London (Bishop of the East Saxons). One of the ward's ancient churches, St Ethelburga-the-Virgin within Bishopsgate, is dedicated to Eorconwald's sister, St Ethelburga of Barking, the first Abbess of Barking Abbey.

In 1471, during the Wars of the Roses, the Yorkist-turned supporter of the House of Lancaster Bastard Fauconberg attacked London, trying to force his way across London Bridge and also attacking the eastern gates with a further five thousand men and artillery. Bishopsgate was set on fire and the attackers came close to capturing nearby Aldgate and with it the city. The attackers were repulsed from both gates with heavy losses, before being chased back to Bow Bridge and Blackwall.

The Bishop's Gate was rebuilt by the Hansa merchants in 1471 in exchange for steelyard privileges. Its final form was erected in 1735 by the City authorities, but demolished in 1760. This gate often displayed the heads of criminals on spikes. London Wall (which is no longer extant in this sector) divided the ward and road into an intramural portion called Bishopsgate Within and an extramural portion called Bishopsgate Without.

The site of this former gate is marked by a stone bishop's mitre, fixed high upon a building located near Bishopsgate's junction with Wormwood Street, by the gardens there and facing the Heron Tower.

== Ward ==
The ward is notable for its skyscrapers, and is home to the main London offices of several major banks, including National Westminster Bank and the European Bank for Reconstruction and Development. Although tens of thousands of people commute to and work in the ward, it has a resident population of only 222 (2011).

The ward is divided into two parts by the line of the former London Wall and gate which lay just north of Wormwood and Camomile Streets.

=== Bishopsgate Without ===
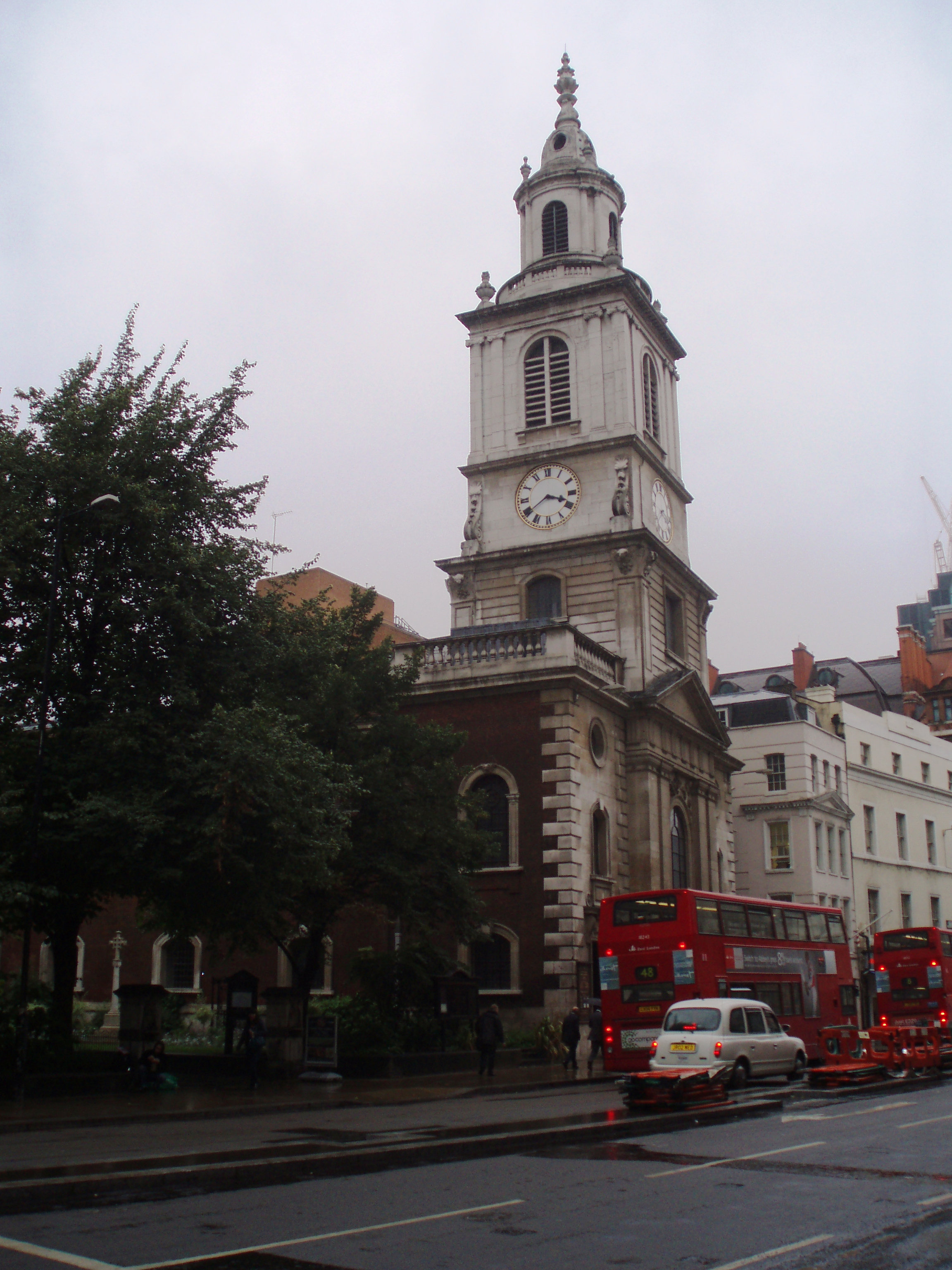
St Botolph-without-Bishopsgate lay immediately north of the original Bishopsgate, and of the defensive ditch around London's Wall.

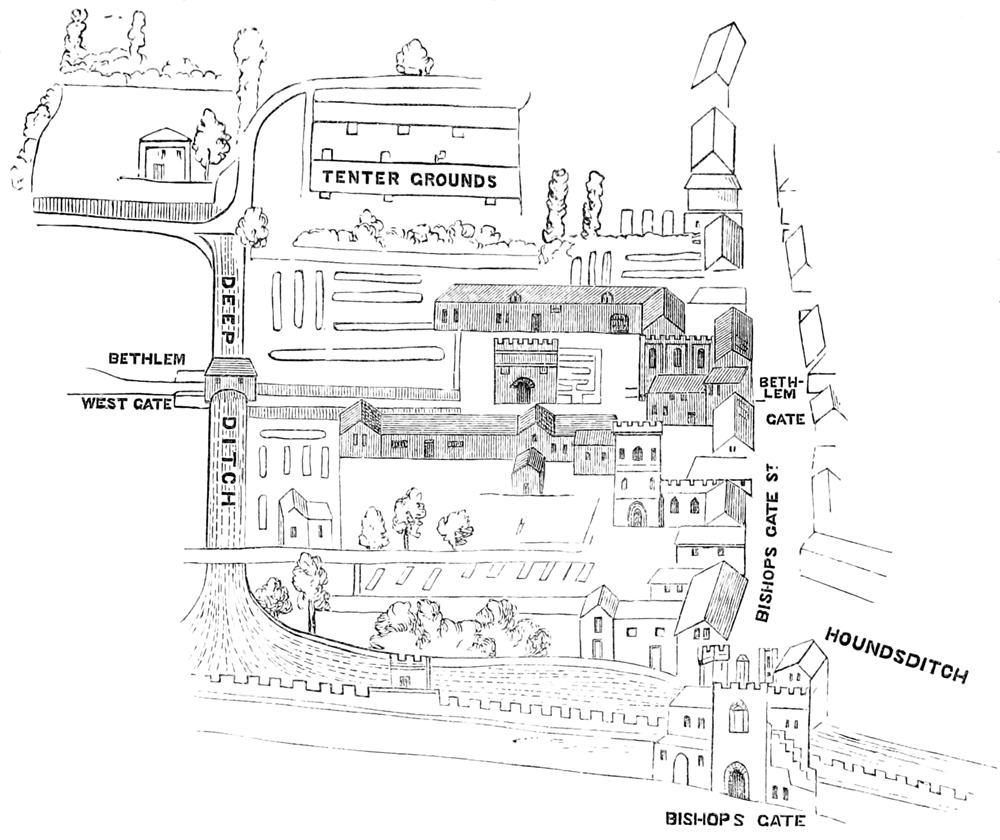
The original Bedlam Hospital. The Deepditch, to the west, is the main branch of the River Walbrook.

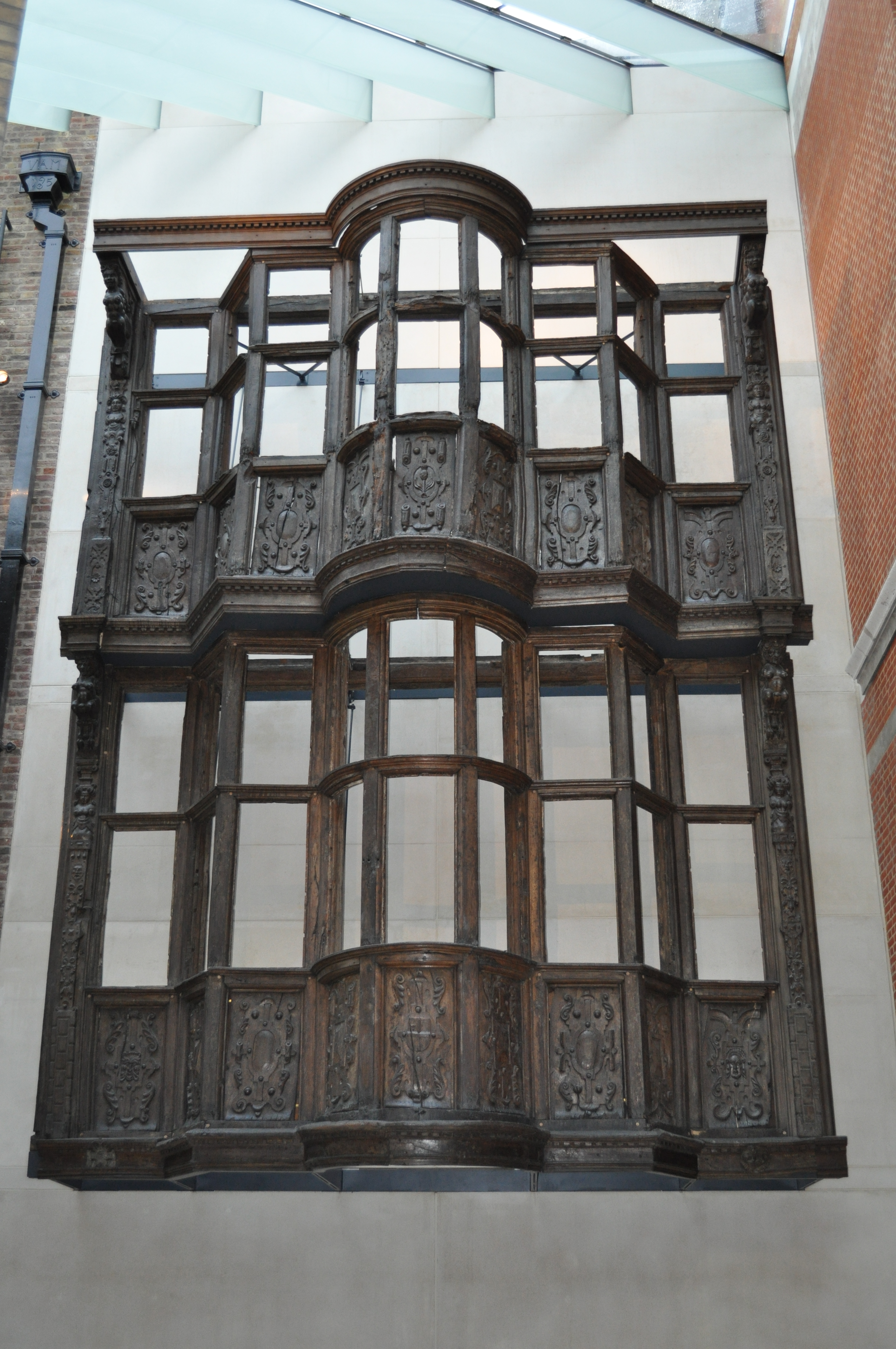
The frontage of Paul Pindar's house on Bishopgate is preserved in the Victoria and Albert Museum.

Bishopsgate Without corresponds to the parish of St Botolph-without-Bishopsgate. The church is located immediately north of the site of the original Gate on the west side of the road. The church was one of four in medieval London dedicated to Saint Botolph or Botwulf, a 7th-century East Anglian saint; three of these were outside city gates, with a fourth near London Bridge and the riverside wharves. The locations result from Botolph being regarded as the patron saint of boundaries, and by extension of trade and travel.

The eastern boundary of Bishopsgate Without is formed by Middlesex Street (better known as Petticoat Lane), with Blomfield Street on the western boundary. Blomfield Street was built on part of the historic course of the former River Walbrook, known at this point as Deepditch. Beyond Deepditch was the Moorfields (in Coleman Street Ward). The Blomfield Street section of the river was the focal point of the Walbrook Skulls; the result of the deposit of large quantities of decapitated Roman-era human skulls into the water. These are still often uncovered during building work.

Bishopsgate Without was, from 1247 to 1633, the first home of the Bethlem Royal Hospital (also known as Bedlam). This psychiatric hospital lay immediately north of St Botolph's church.

Around 1597, the merchant Sir Paul Pindar, purchased several existing properties, and built himself a new home on the site (incorporating part of one or more of the old properties). The house had a fairly narrow frontage but extended a long way back. Bishopsgate Street had recently been paved, making the site convenient for Pindar's business activities in East Anglia. The house had views over the open space in nearby Moorfields and Finsbury Fields, west of the Walbrook. The house was soon prestigious enough to be used as a base by several foreigh ambassadors, including the Venetian ambassador Pietro Contarini in 1617–18.

The district was then on the edge of London, something Contarini had mixed feelings about, describing Bishopsgate Without as "…an airy and fashionable area…a little too much in the country"

In the 1600s, Bishopsgate Without, together with neighbouring Bethnal Green and Spitalfields was home to many Huguenot refugees, many of them weavers. In the late 1600s wealthy residents began to migrate to the newly developed areas of West End of London and the character of the area began to change, partly due to the more prosperous parts of the community leaving, and partly to the densification of the area and rapid urbanisation of the neighbouring rural areas.

In time, the East and West Ends of London became more strikingly different in character, writing of the period around 1800, Rev. Richardson commented:

The inhabitants of the extreme east of London knew nothing of the western localities and vice-versa. There was little communication or sympathy between the two ends of London. …and thus the householders of Westminster were as distinct from householders of Bishopsgate Without, Shoreditch and all those localities which stretch towards the Essex side of the city, as they are from the inhabitants of Holland or Belgium.

— Rev. J. Richardson (1856)

Bishopsgate Without was a very densely populated neighbourhood, prior to the opening (1874) and later expansion (1891) of Liverpool Street station, which now dominates the area. The initial opening of the station saw 3,000 residents of Bishopsgate Without evicted and their homes demolished. Around 7,000 people in neighbouring Shoreditch also lost their homes to the railway tracks feeding into the station.

Notable buildings include:

- Broadgate Tower
- Heron Tower
- Liverpool Street station
- Great Eastern Hotel
- Bishopsgate Institute
- Broadgate Estate
- Dirty Dick's (a 200 year old pub)
- Bishopsgate Victorian Bath House

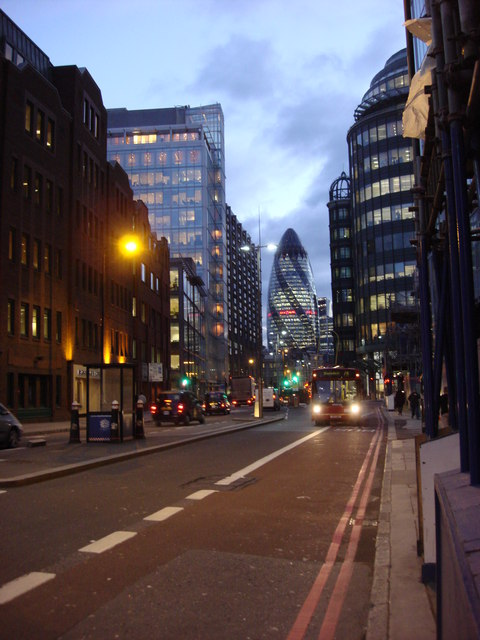
Looking south from Norton Folgate down Bishopsgate

=== Bishopsgate Within ===
Bishopsgate Within was originally divided into many parishes, each with its own parish church: St Andrew Undershaft, St Ethelburga Bishopsgate, St Martin Outwich, St Mary Axe and St Helen's Bishopsgate, now all amalgamated under the last of these. St Helen's is a historic medieval church and former monastic establishment with many ancient funerary monuments and a stained glass window commemorating William Shakespeare, a local parishioner in the early to mid-1590s. The area was well located for Shakespeare, being close to the theatres in Shoreditch where he worked; The Theatre and the Curtain Theatre.

Notable buildings include:

- 99 Bishopsgate
- 100 Bishopsgate
- Tower 42
- 22 Bishopsgate

=== Ward boundary changes ===
The 1994 (city), 2003 and 2013 (ward) boundary revisions made fundamental changes to the ancient boundaries of the ward. The 1994 changes saw Bishopsgate Without (and with it the City of London) gain a large area from the Shoreditch area of the London Borough of Hackney,

The changes made in 2003 and 2013 shifted land between wards of the city. The effect of this was to transfer nearly all of Bishopsgate Within (except for a small area surrounding the Leathersellers' livery hall) to other wards. The ward previously extended much further south, along the Bishopsgate road and Gracechurch Street. At this time Bishopsgate Without lost a small block of buildings east Blomfield Street to the Broad Street ward.

There were no changes to Bishopsgate's ward boundaries in the 2013 boundary changes.

The revised ward borders the London Borough of Hackney to the north, it neighbours The Portsoken and the borough of Tower Hamlets in the east. The other neighbours are Aldgate (southeast), Coleman Street (west), Cornhill (south-west), Broad Street and Lime Street (south).

=== Politics ===
Bishopsgate is one of 25 wards in the City of London, each electing an Alderman to the Court of Aldermen, and Commoners (the City equivalent of a councillor) to the Court of Common Council of the City of London Corporation. Only electors who are Freemen of the City of London are eligible to stand. On 15 September 2022 the ward elected Kawsar Zaman as its Alderman. He is only the third non-white Alderman in the city's hundreds of years of history, the first British-Bangladeshi ever to hold the office, and the youngest ever elected to the Court of Alderman.

=== Street ===
The street called Bishopsgate (formerly Bishopsgate Street), which takes its name from the Gate, is the main thoroughfare of the Ward. It is a stretch of the originally Roman Ermine Street (now the A10) between Gracechurch Street and Norton Folgate, taking the name Bishopsgate only within the historical area of the ward.

Although it takes its name from the gate, the road pre-dates the building of the London Wall which was built in the late second or early third centuries. Ermine Street (sometimes called the Old North Road) connected London to Cambridge, Lincoln, York and other towns and cities.

== History ==
=== Early history ===
In the Roman period it was illegal to bury the dead within the city, so cemeteries were established outside the city gates. There were large burial grounds outside Bishopsgate, on both side of Ermine Street.

The wards of London appear to have taken shape in the 11th century, before the Norman Conquest. Their administrative, judicial and military purpose made them equivalent to hundreds in the countryside. The primary purpose of wards like Bishopsgate, which included a gate, appears to be the defence of the gate, as gates were the weakest points in any fortification.

The earliest origins of the wards reach back further than the 11th century but their emergence and evolution is uncertain and any narrative conjectural. The ward may have developed from the Soke of Bishopsgate, a set of rights, and possibly land, held by the Bishop of London over an area to the east of the River Walbrook. The Bishop may have been granted the land and rights in order to promote growth in the under-developed part of the city east of the Walbrook. Outside the wall the Walbrook formed the boundary between the Soke of Bishopsgate to the east and the Soke of Cripplegate on the other side of the brook.

Bishopsgate may have originally included the area that subsequently became known as Lime Street Ward.

The Domesday Survey of 1086 did not cover London, but a landholding called Bishopsgate is recorded nearby; this may have been the property later known as Norton Folgate.

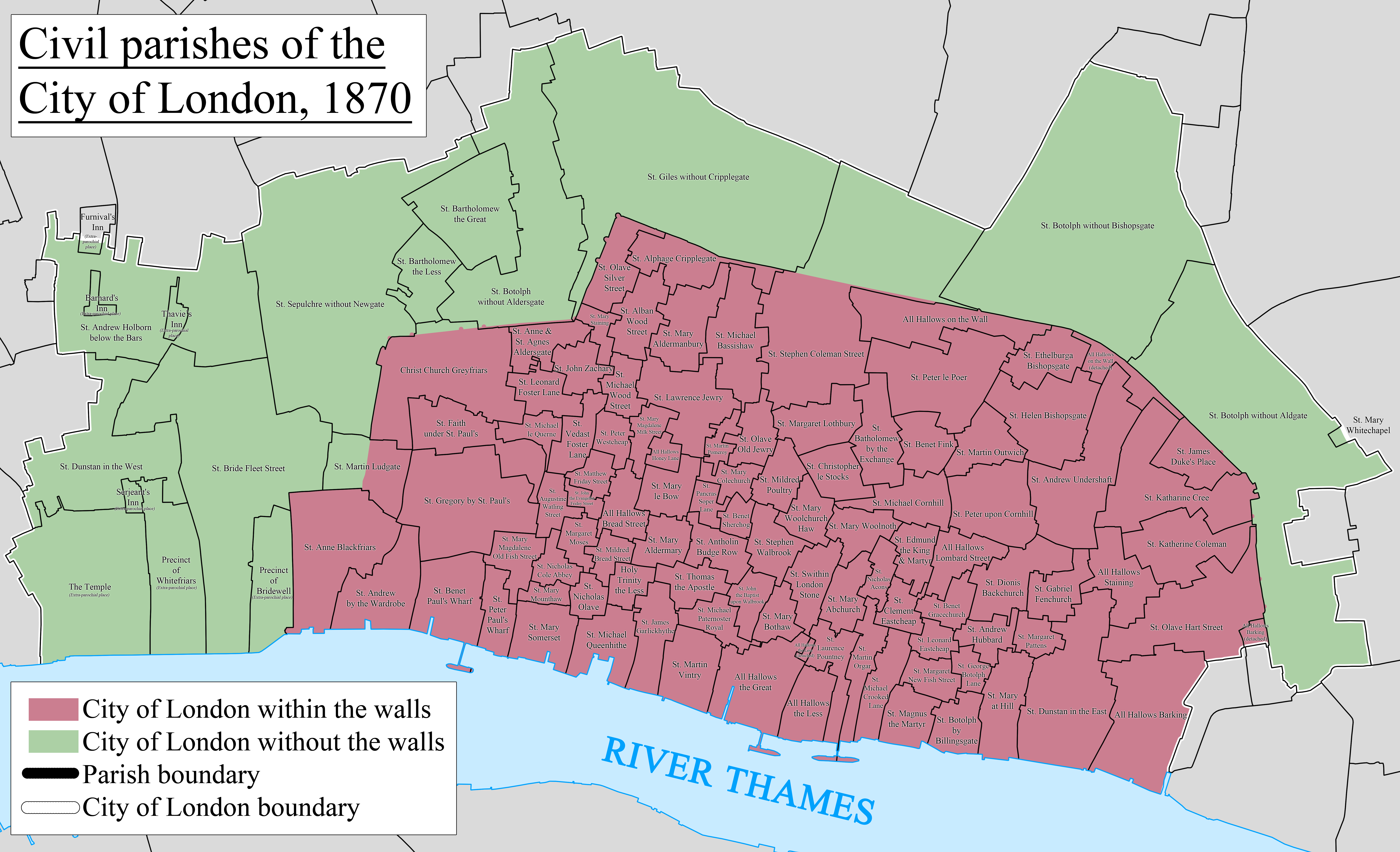
Bishopsgate Without served by a single coterminous parish, with Bishopsgate Within formerly served by five

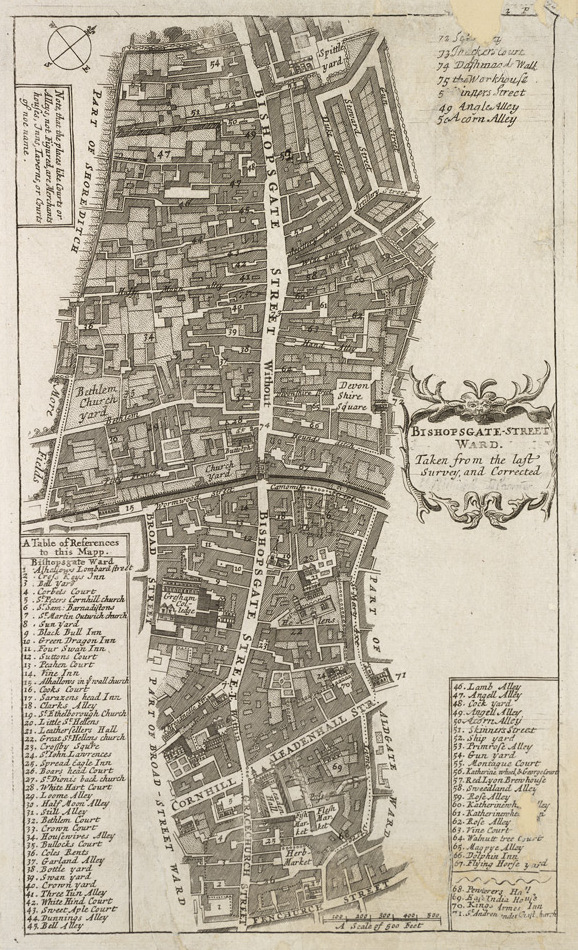
Bishopsgate-Street Ward in 1720

=== Coaching inns ===
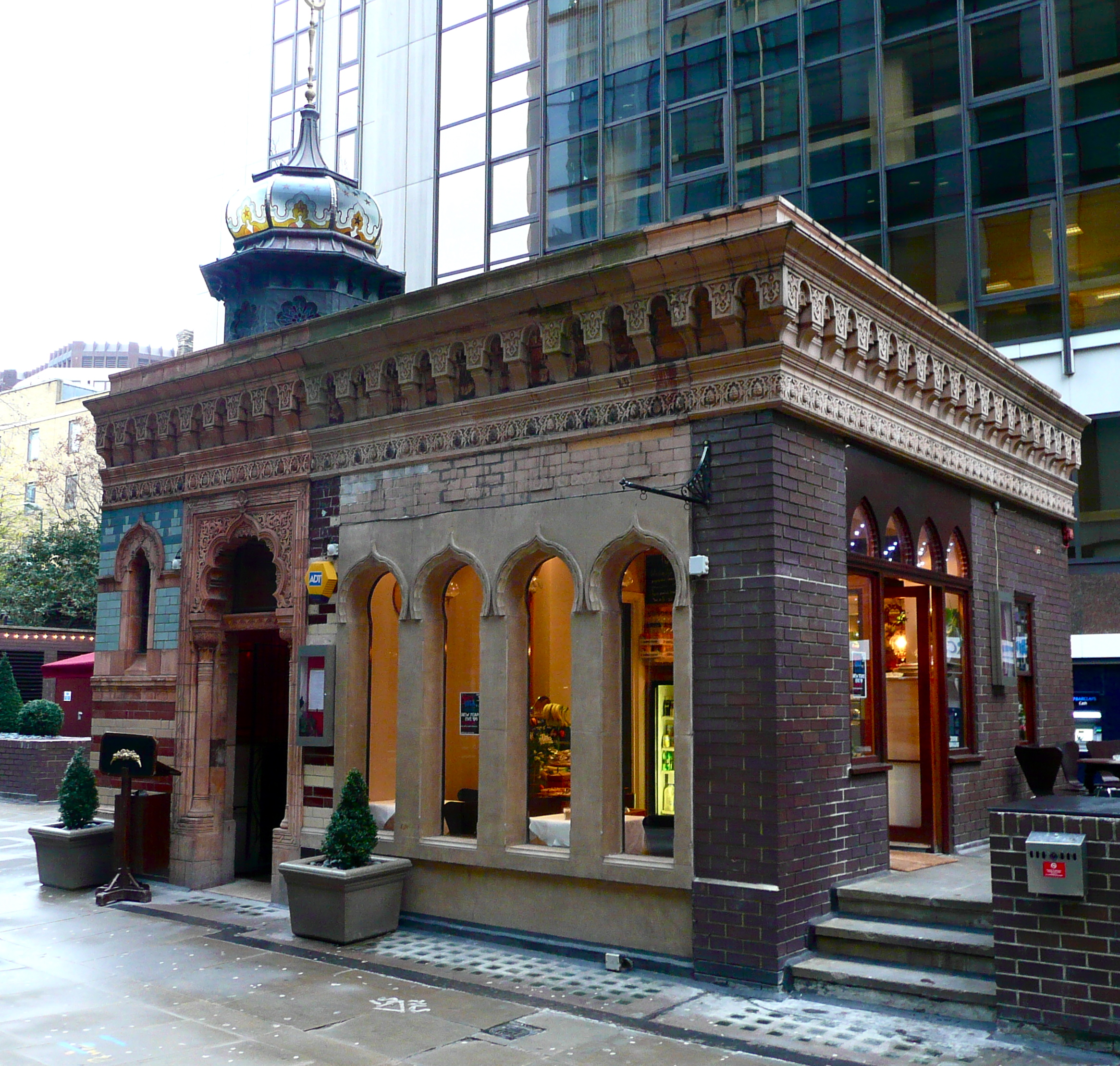
Bishopsgate Victorian Bath House, now run as a restaurant and event venue

Bishopsgate had many coaching inns which accommodated passengers setting out on the originally Roman Ermine Street, that issued from the gate. Although they survived the Great Fire of London, they have now all been demolished. These included the Angel, the Black Bull, the Dolphin, the Flower Pot, the Green Dragon, the Magpie and Punchbowl, the White Hart and the Wrestlers. The Black Bull was a venue for the Queen's Men theatrical troupe in the 16th century. The English politician Anthony Bacon moved nearby with his mother in May 1594 and she complained about the plays and interludes at the Bull which might "corrupt his servants".

An inn called the Catherine Wheel (demolished 1911) is commemorated by Catherine Wheel Alley which leads off Bishopsgate to the east. The 17th century façade of Sir Paul Pindar's House on Bishopsgate, demolished, with many other old buildings, for the expansion of Liverpool Street railway station in 1890, was also preserved and can now be seen in the Victoria and Albert Museum. In the 18th century this grand residence became a tavern called Sir Paul Pindar's Head; another notable venue was the London Tavern (1768–1876). Also demolished (but then re-erected in Chelsea in 1910) was the old Crosby Hall, at one time the residence of Richard III and Thomas More.

=== Bishopsgate Mutiny ===
In 1649, during the Wars of the Three Kingdoms, Colonel Whalley's Regiment, a parliamentary unit, was stationed in Bishopsgate Ward, helping to protect London from Royalists. The Bishopsgate mutiny occurred when soldiers of the regiment, mutinied against parliament—partly due to their radical Leveller sympathies. A surrender was eventually negotiated, but Robert Lockyer a parishioner of Bishopsgate Without as well as a soldier in the regiment, was executed as a ringleader.

=== Communist Manifesto ===
The Communist Manifesto was first printed, anonymously and in German, by the Workers Educational Association at 46 Liverpool Street in Bishopsgate Without in 1848.

=== Terrorist attack ===
On 24 April 1993, it was the site of an IRA truck bombing which killed journalist Ed Henty, injured over 40 people and caused £1 billion worth of damage, including the destruction of St Ethelburga's church and damage to the NatWest Tower and Liverpool Street station. Police had received a coded warning, but were still evacuating the area at the time of the explosion. The area had already suffered damage from the Baltic Exchange bombing one year before.

St Ethelburga's was rebuilt, functioning not just as a church but also as home to the St Ethelburga's Centre for Reconciliation and Peace charity.

== Gallery ==
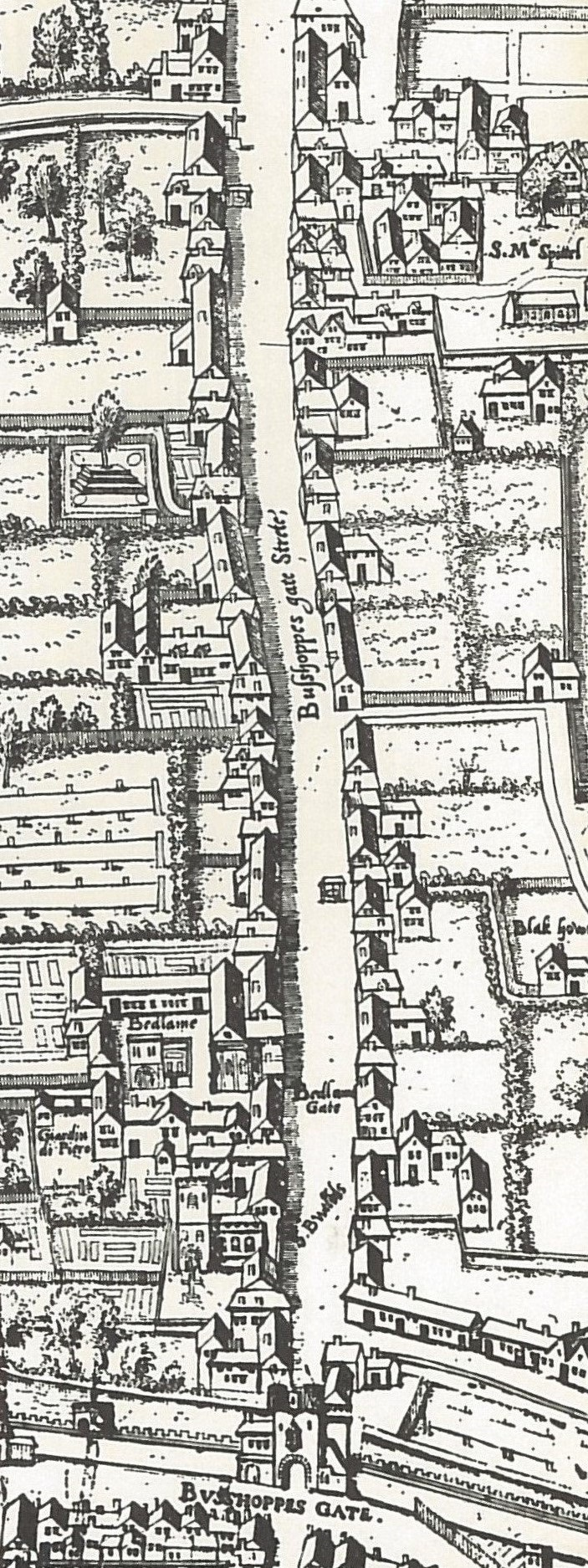
Bishopsgate and the extramural part of Bishopsgate Street, as shown on the "Copperplate" map of London of the 1550s

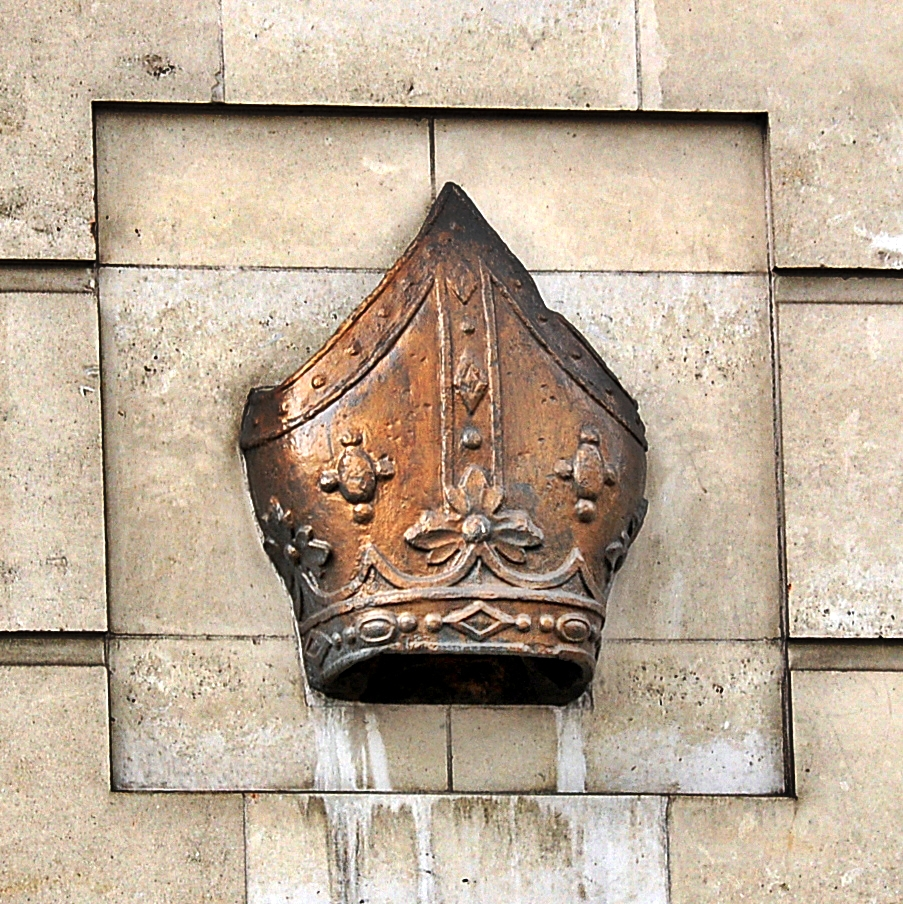
The bishop's mitre at Bishopsgate's junction with Wormwood Street

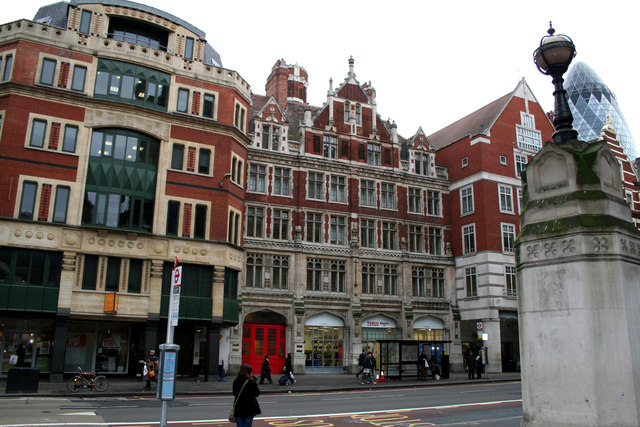
A former London Fire Brigade station on Bishopsgate (designed by Robert Pearsall), now a supermarket

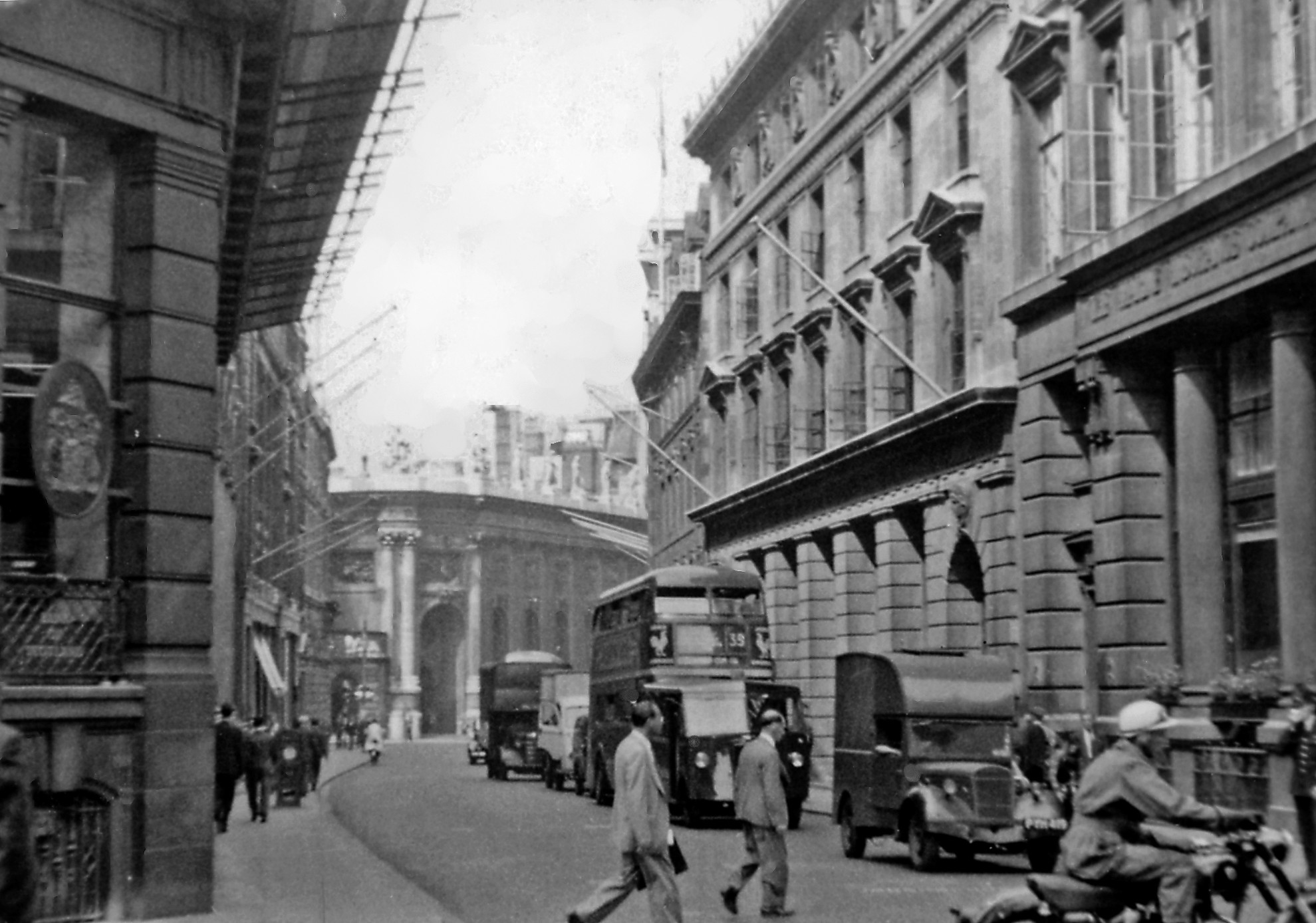
The southernmost portion of Bishopsgate pictured in 1955, looking north toward the National Provincial Bank

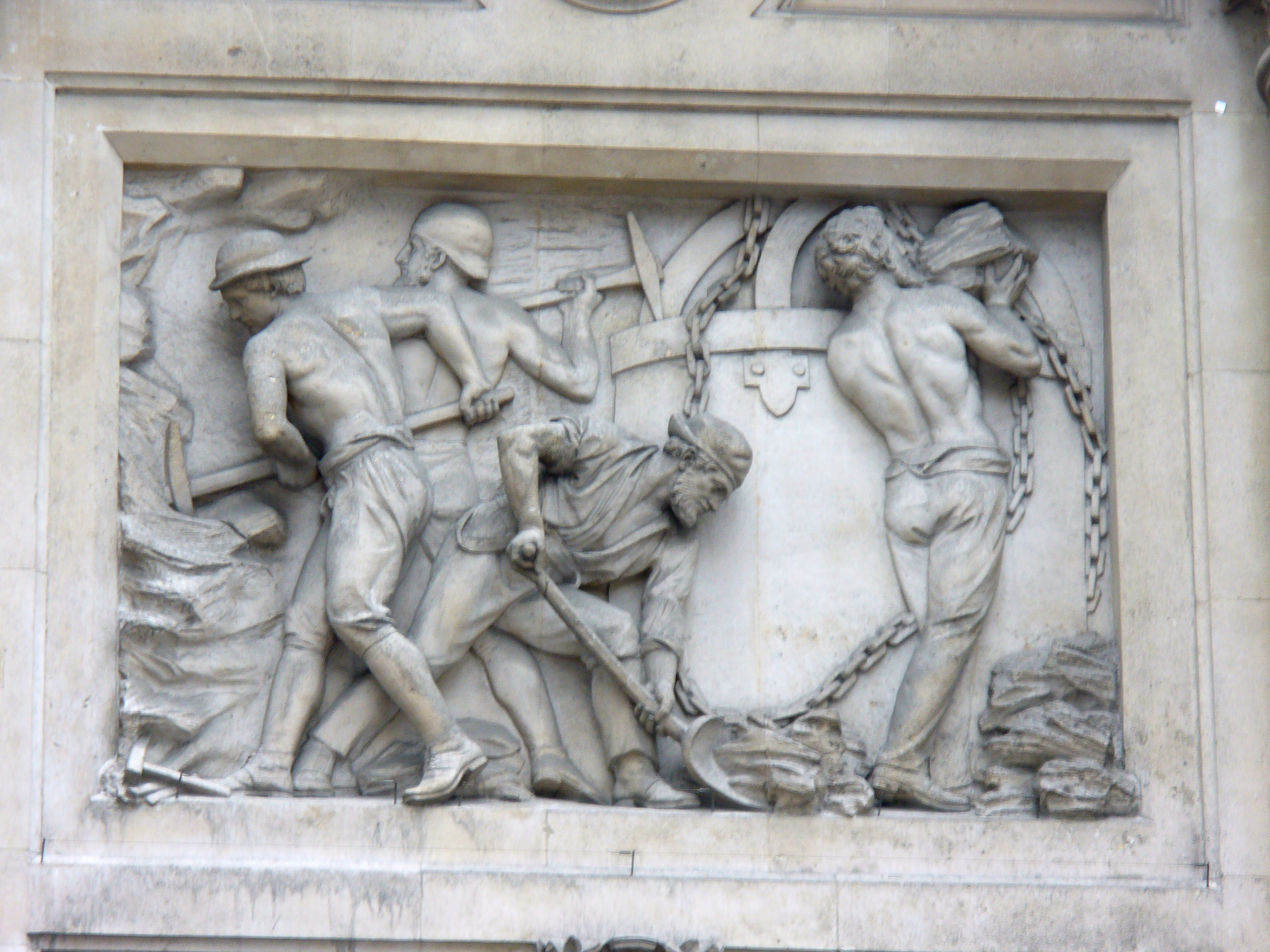
Bas relief on the former National Provincial Bank

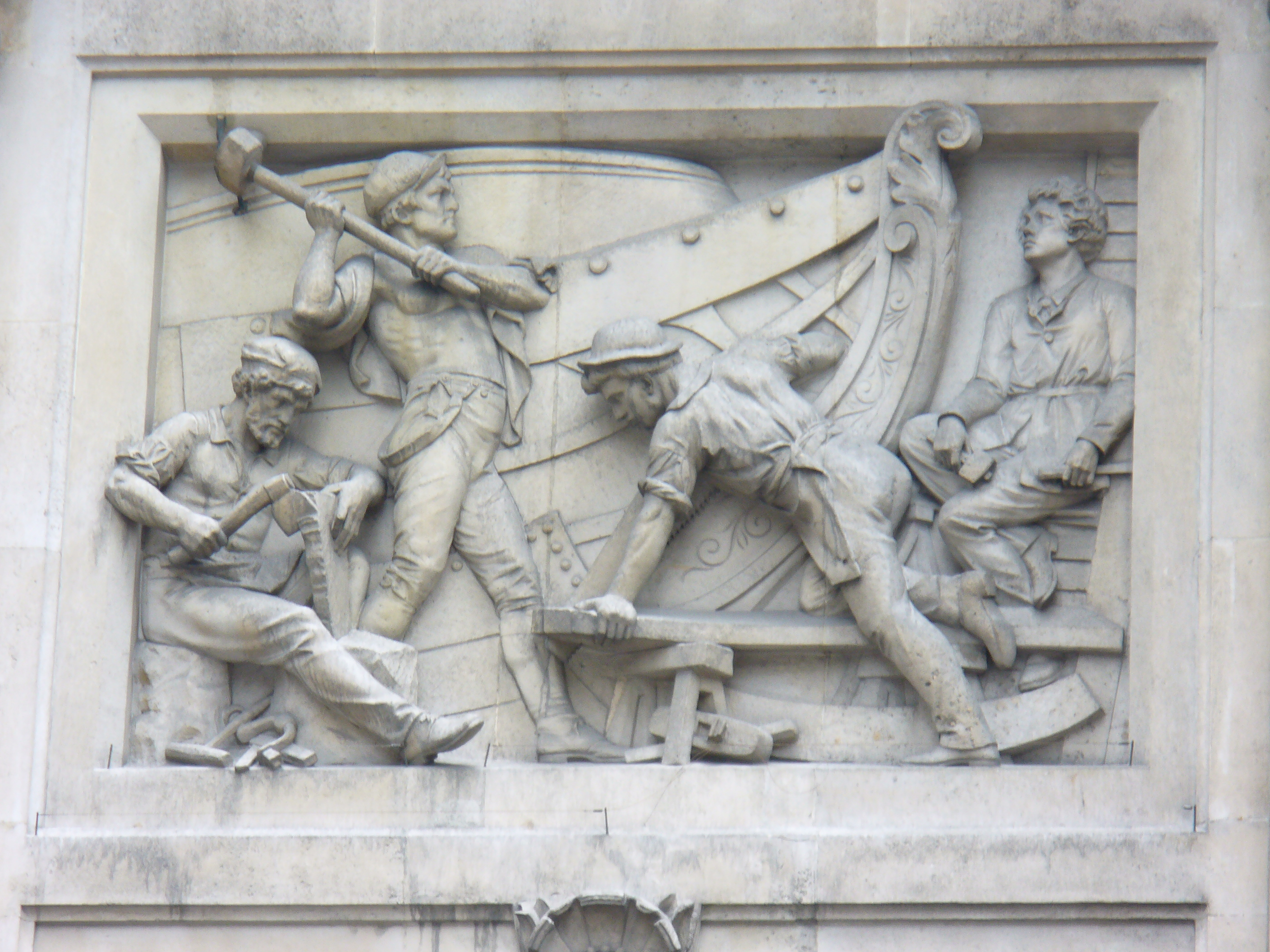
From the same building

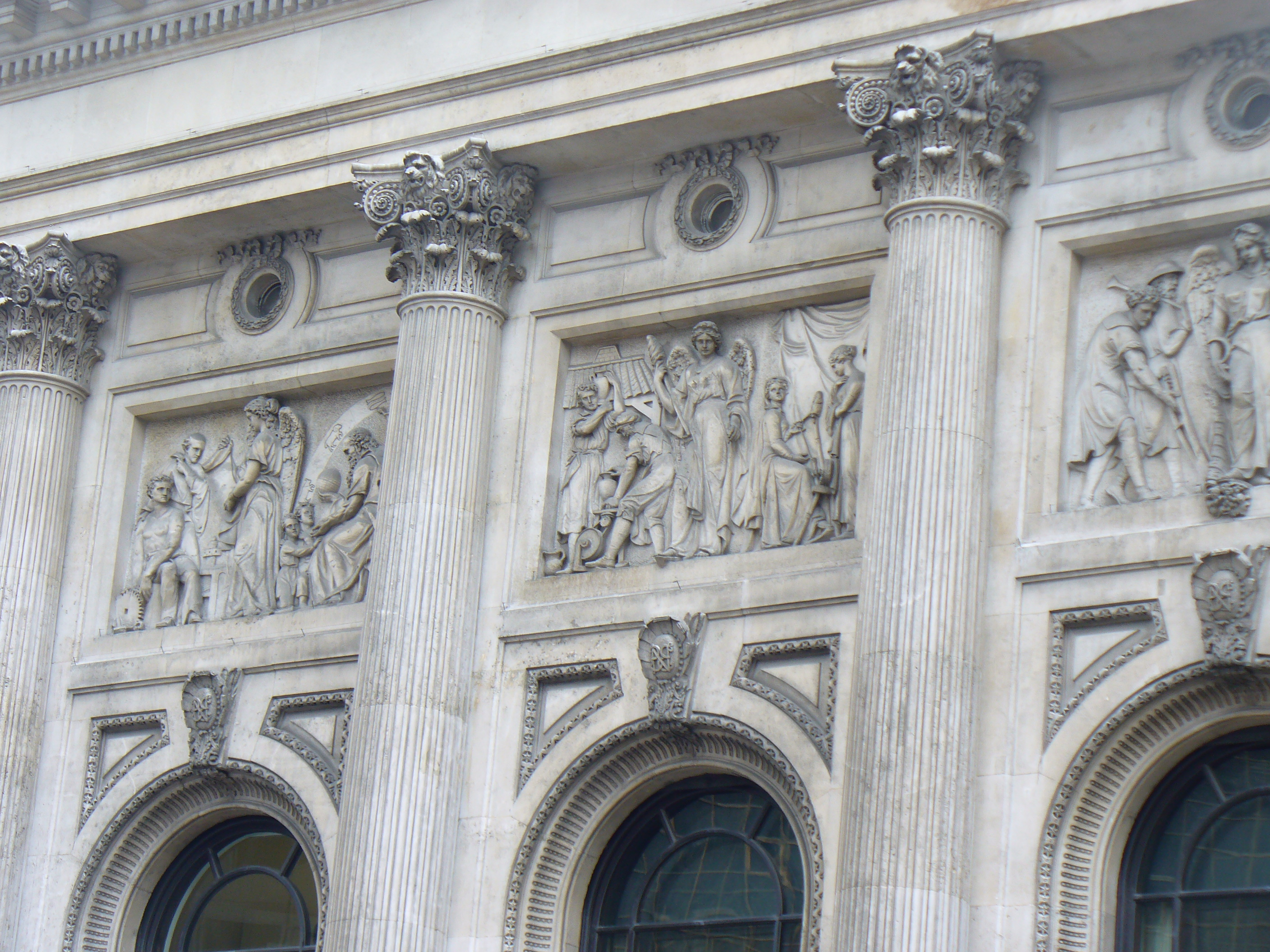
Overview of another part of the building

== See also ==
- Fortifications of London
- Mention in "Being for the Benefit of Mr. Kite!" by the Beatles: "The celebrated Mr. K. performs his feat on Saturday at Bishopsgate."
