= River Walbrook =

Subterranean river in the City of London, England

Coordinates: 51°30′33.89″N 0°5′33.25″W

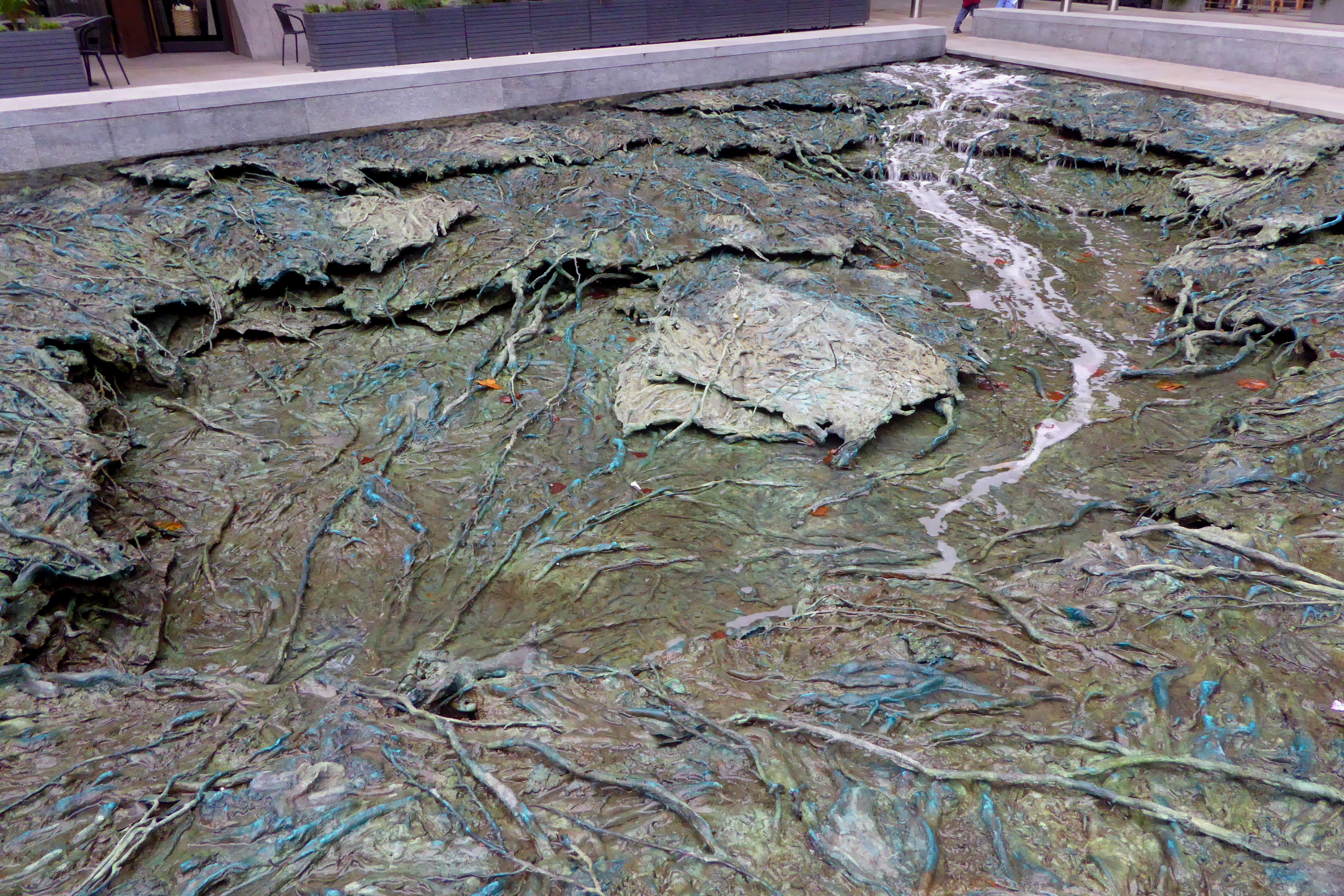
"Forgotten Streams", a sculpture by Cristina Iglesias marking the location of the Walbrook.

The Walbrook is a subterranean river in London. It gives its name to the Walbrook City ward and to a nearby street. It played an important role in the Roman settlement of Londinium.

== Name ==
The usual interpretation is that the brook's name comes from weala broc meaning "brook of the foreigners" (usually taken to mean the native Britons, who were also referred to as the Welsh). This suggests that there was a British speaking quarter in the city in the Anglo-Saxon period, and this possibility has been linked to the division of the city by the Walbrook, with claims that the Britons lived on Cornhill to the east, while the Saxons lived on Ludgate Hill to the west.

Another theory is that it was so named because it ran through or under the London Wall.

Geoffrey of Monmouth linked it to the phenomena of the Walbrook Skulls (below); recounting, or inventing an explanation where the name Gallobroc derived from the name of a vanquished Roman leader called Livius Gallus.

The main branch flowing from the parish of Shoreditch was known (above the Wall) as the Deepditch, Flood Ditch or just The Ditch.

== Division of the City ==
The Walbrook divided the city into two hills: Ludgate Hill to the west and Cornhill to the east.

London divided by the Walbrook, around 1300.

It is thought that in the Anglo-Saxon period there may have been two Stallerships in the City, one for the land west of the river, and one for the east. Even beyond the walls, the river separated landholdings, with the Soke of Cripplegate to the west and the Soke of Bishopsgate to the east. By the 11th century, the two halves of the City had a distinct economy, character, customs and regulations. The western side was more populous and prosperous, it had the cathedral, the royal palace (which later moved to Westminster) and its large market, Westcheap, was focussed on land-based trade. The east was poorer and more sparsely settled; its smaller market, Eastcheap, was sited near the river to allow it to specialise in seaborne trade.

The division of the City into two parts persisted, in a less fundamental way, even to the time of John Stow, writing in 1603.

It has been suggested that the probable derivation of the name Walbrook, river of foreigners (i.e. the native Britons), meant that there was a part of the city inhabited by native Britons (also known as Welsh), and this is assumed to be the eastern side on Cornhill, with the Saxons based on the higher status western Ludgate Hill.

== Impact of London's Wall ==
London's defensive wall seems to have had an unintended impact on the river, acting like a dam to impede the flow of the river and create the marshy conditions which characterised the open space at Moorfields. The wall's surrounding ditch may have diverted some of the water that would otherwise have gone through the City.

== Walbrook skulls ==
In 1838 construction workers building a new sewer under Blomfield Street, on the course of the Walbrook, discovered very large numbers of human skulls, though very few other bones were present.

"An immense number of human skulls were found throughout this street" (ie Blomfield Street)

Since that time, around 300 further heads have been found in the bed of the river, generally in the vicinity of the initial discovery. It is believed that the number of heads destroyed by development, or awaiting discovery, may be in the order of many thousands.

Writing around 1136, Geoffrey of Monmouth seemed to be aware of the presence of the remarkable number of skulls on the riverbed. His History of the Kings of Britain explained their origin as resulting from a massacre occurring during a Roman civil war, the Carausian Revolt of AD 286–296. In Geoffrey's account, a Roman legion under Livius Gallus, besieged in London, agrees to surrender to the forces of Julius Asclepiodotus on condition they are given safe passage out of Britain. Asclepiodotus is happy to grant this, but his allies the Venedoti moved on the captives, beheading them all in a single day. Geoffrey wrote that the river was afterwards named after Livius Gallus, the leader of the beheaded Romans, as Nantgallum in Welsh (the language of the native Britons), or in the Saxon English as Galobroc, from which Walbrook was derived. However, Geoffrey's History is unreliable, and other theories have been proposed.

Some historians consider these skulls to be a result of the rebellion of Boudica. More recently, the skulls have been dated mostly to the early 2nd century AD, and it has again been suggested that the skulls are the consequence of an anti-Roman rebellion in the 120s when London suffered a second major fire often called the Hadrianic fire. The three martial explanations may link to the proposition, made by archaeologists, that some of the skulls may have represented ritual deposits of heads related to the Celtic cult of the head.

Archaeological excavations across this area in the late 20th and early 21st centuries (two examples are Finsbury Circus and Liverpool Street) revealed a Roman burial ground which included graves scoured by the River Walbrook, and it was suggested that skulls might come from this. Other factors should also be considered here: the 'heads' or 'skulls' which have been recovered were actually crania (ie only the main/top part of the skulls - the accompanying jaw bones, which would have provided vital evidence for beheadings, execution or indeed massacre, were missing); human skulls are profoundly identifiable as being human and are more likely to have been spotted and collected during construction work - every single controlled archaeological excavation in this area has also uncovered other human bones, creating less of a bias towards 'skulls'; the crania recovered recently at Liverpool Street had a wide date range and therefore could not have amassed as the result of a single event (the 2nd-century bias noted above probably simply reflects the size of Roman London's population).

The vast numbers of crania found across the Walbrook valley suggest that, in essence, there were probably several different factors at play. Some individuals may indeed have experienced a violent end. The majority of the crania, however, were likely to have been displaced from their nearby graves by a combination of gravel extraction (to enable a 2nd-century expansion to Londinium which required large amounts of gravel for new roads, yards and thresholds) and occasional flooding by the Walbrook itself. Roman gravel-extraction workers, in a similar way to 19th-century construction workers, may have created an unintentional bias in, respectively, reverential crania reburial and crania collection and it is that which has emerged to help to create such an intriguing phenomenon.

== Catchment and course ==
The Walbrook had many small tributaries and the course of the various branches are ill-mapped and ill-understood, particularly in the upper reaches above London's Wall. Each new excavation in the area brings a refined understanding.

The routes of the various branches may have changed over time, further complicating the limited understanding of the river’s history. These changes in course may have been due to natural changes and human intervention.

Modern maps of London in the Roman period show the Walbrook as having many tributaries. Roman London - a New Map and Guide shows six branches. Most of these branches are to the West of the main eastern stream.

=== Sources ===
The river appears to have had a main eastern branch which ran from Hoxton, in the parish of Shoreditch, and one or more others flowing from Finsbury to the west. The picture is unclear, but both of these branches may have had ultimate sources as far north as Islington.

The main branch of the stream, entering the city along the line of Blomfield Street, was known as Deepditch. This main stream, and one or more of the western tributaries appear to have met in Moorfields, north of the City Wall. The river flowed south down what is now Blomfield Street, to the east of Finsbury Circus.

Just to the north of wall, the main branch (Deepditch) formed the boundary of the city wards of Coleman Street to the west, and Bishopsgate Without to the east.

It then entered the walled area of the City just west of All Hallows-on-the-Wall Church.

=== Within London's Wall ===
The brook flowed southward through the centre of the walled city, bringing a supply of fresh water whilst carrying waste away to the River Thames, at Dowgate; it effectively divided the settlement in two.

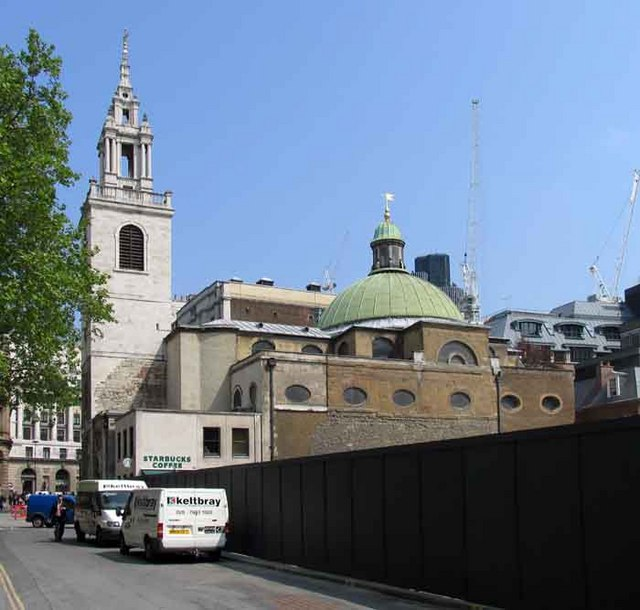
St Stephen Walbrook

Stow in the 16th century suggested there was a branch, called the Langbourne (see Langbourne Ward) to the east, rising at St Katherine Coleman and running SW along Fenchurch Street (making this area 'fenny'), along Lombard Street, into Sherborne Lane and presumably into the Walbrook. Later scholars have been doubtful. Ralph Merrifield reported a stream flowing SW through the area that would later be the Roman Forum, which would have flown into this putative stream in Lombard Street. The main mentioned at the top of this section reports another stream called the 'Lorteburn' flowing directly into the Thames; perhaps there has been confusion between these various streams.

It emerged just to the west of the present-day Cannon Street Railway Bridge. During Roman times it was also used for transport, with the limit of navigation some 200 m from the Thames, where the Bucklersbury building now stands. It was there the Romans built a port and temple to Mithras on the east bank of the stream. The temple was found and later excavated during rebuilding work after World War II. The Roman Governor's palace was found further down the east bank of the stream, near its entry into the Thames.

== Demise ==
In the 15th century, the monasteries of Charterhouse and St Bartholomews diverted the headwaters of the Walbrook to their sites in the River Fleet catchment. It has been suggested that this caused a significant reduction in the flow of the Walbrook.

When the church of St Margaret Lothbury was rebuilt in 1440, the Lord Mayor Robert Large paid for the lower Walbrook to be covered over. By the time of the first maps of the area, the "copperplate" map of the 1550s and the derivative "Woodcut" map of c. 1561, the whole Walbrook within the city walls was culverted. John Stow, the historian of London, wrote about the Walbrook in 1598, saying that the watercourse, having several bridges, was afterwards vaulted over with brick and paved level with the streets and lanes where it passed and that houses had been built so that the stream was hidden as it is now.

== Modern developments ==
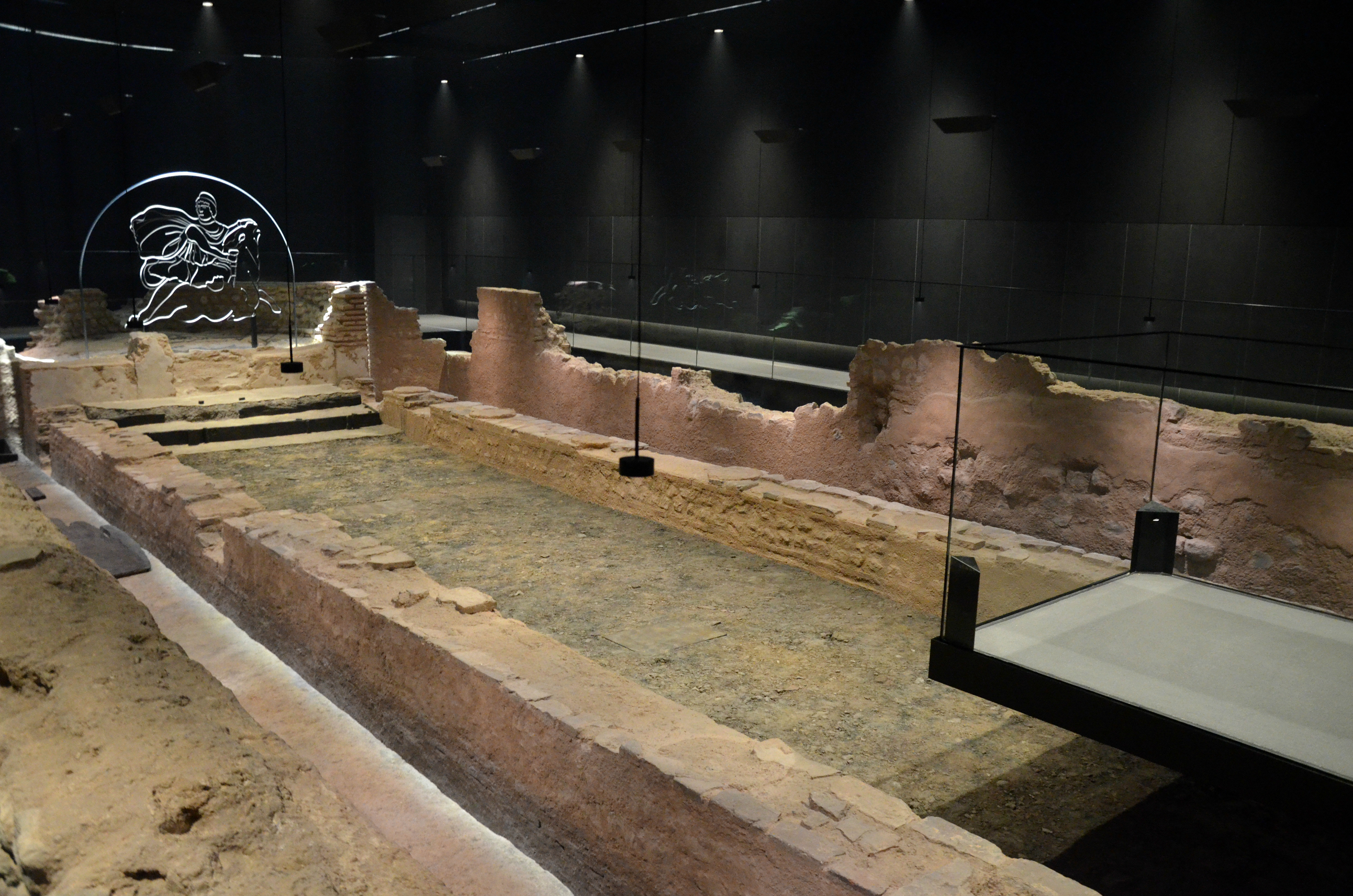
London Mithraeum, ruins of the cult of Mithras stemming from ancient Persia by way of the Romans

The construction of the massive infrastructure of the London sewerage system, with five main sewers, incorporated many existing culverts, storm sewers, and sluices. This included the culverted Walbrook, which by 1860 had been linked into a network of 82 miles (132 km) of new sewerage lines, channelled to the Northern Low Level Sewer at a point near the Bank of England. Many small leaks stream into the rounded sewer for much of the year when the water table is high enough. On 18 June 1999, during the "Carnival Against Capitalism", timed to coincide with the 25th G8 summit, fire hydrants were opened along the route of the Walbrook by Reclaim the Streets, symbolically releasing the river to "reclaim the street" from the "capitalist forces" of city growth which had subsumed it.

== See also ==
- Roman sites in the United Kingdom
- Tributaries of the River Thames
- Subterranean rivers of London
- List of rivers in England

Next confluence upstream	River Thames	Next confluence downstream
River Fleet (north)	River Walbrook	River Neckinger (south)
