= Moorfields =

Former London open space

Coordinates: 51.518188°N 0.088611°W

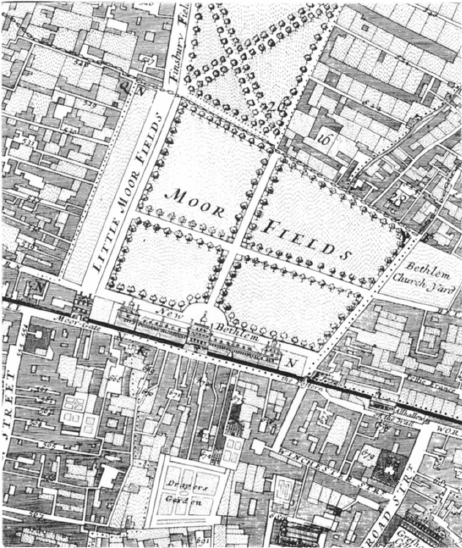
Moorfields in 1676, as depicted on Ogilby and Morgan's map of London, including the re-sited Bethlem Hospital. The city wall and the Moorgate are clearly visible, and some of the administrative boundaries are also shown.

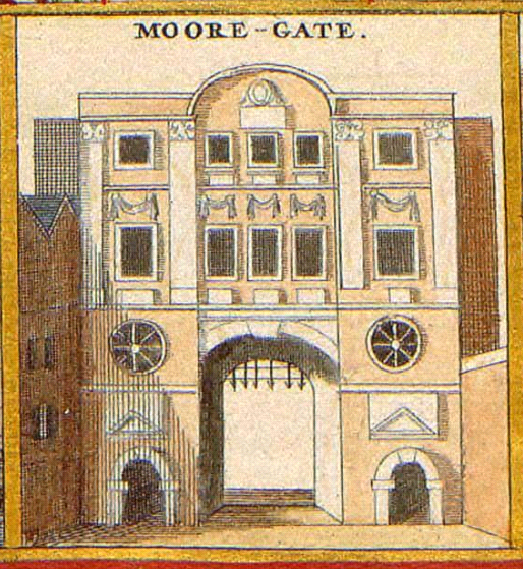
The Moorgate, last of the gates to be built in London's wall, took its name from the adjacent Moorfields.

Moorfields was an open space, partly in the City of London, lying adjacent to – and outside – its northern wall, near the eponymous Moorgate. It was known for its marshy conditions, the result of the defensive wall acting as a dam, impeding the flow of the River Walbrook and its tributaries.

Moorfields gives its name to the Moorfields Eye Hospital which occupied a site on the former fields from 1822 to 1899, and is still based close by, in the St Luke's area of the London Borough of Islington.

== Setting ==
Moorfields is first recorded in the late 12th century, though not by name, as a great fen. The fen was larger than the area subsequently known as Moorfields.

Moorfields was contiguous with Finsbury Fields, Bunhill Fields and other open spaces, and until its eventual loss in the 19th century, was the innermost part of a green wedge of land which stretched from the wall, to the open countryside which lay close by. Moorfields separated the western and eastern growth of London beyond the city wall – with the eastern extension being better known as the East End.

The fields were divided into four areas; the Little Moorfields, Moorfields proper, Middle Moorfields and Upper Moorfields.

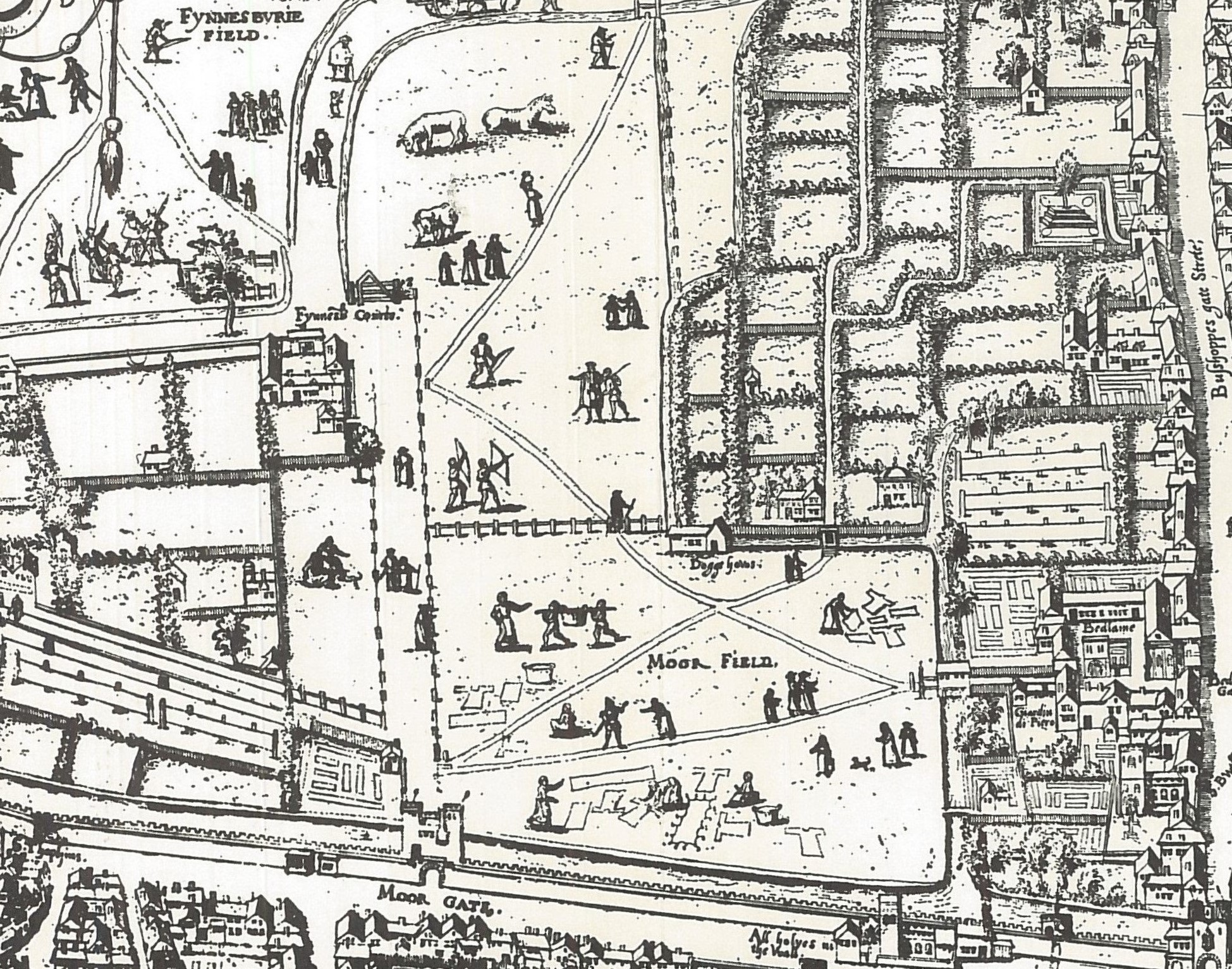
Moorgate (at bottom) and the Moorfields area shown on the "Copperplate" map of London of the 1550s

=== Great Fen ===
The origins of Moorfields lie in a wider area, described by William Fitzstephen as the "great fen which washed against the northern wall of the City". The marshy conditions appear to have been caused by London's Wall acting as a dam, restricting the flow of the river.

The fen covered much of the Manor of Finsbury, but its exact extent is not clear. It has been suggested that it extended west from the Walbrook which fed it, extending to the vicinity of Old Street in the north, and the road from Cripplegate in the west. Other commentators have suggested that the topography of the area means the marsh probably didn’t extend as far west due to higher ground there, but did extend further north and possibly, in places, further east.

=== Little Moorfields and Moorfields Proper ===
The Little Moorfields and Moorfields proper (also known as Lower Moorfields) were just north of London's wall, and from 1676 to 1815 included the Bethlem Hospital. Little Moorfields was the element that was left lying just west of Moorgate Street after a gap had been made in the wall to create the Moorgate, and the associated road from the north, in the 15th and 16th century. These parts were inside the City boundaries, lying in the Coleman Street Ward.

It is thought that this open space was not included within the City’s administrative boundaries until the 17th century, prior to that being part of the Manor of Finsbury.

Moorfields proper and Little Moorfields formed the extra-mural part of Coleman Street Ward

The Walbrook, known at this point as Deepditch and running on the line of modern Blomfield Street, seems to have formed the eastern boundary of Moorfields proper. It also formed an administrative boundary, with Coleman Street Ward to the west (including the open spaces of Little Moorfields and Moorfields proper); while on the East End side lay the urbanised extra-mural ward of Bishopsgate Without, and also the parish of Shoreditch.

This section of the Walbrook, around Blomfield Street, was the focal point of the Walbrook Skulls; the result of the deposit of large numbers of decapitated Roman-era human skulls into the water. These are still regularly uncovered during building work.

=== Middle and Upper Moorfields ===
Middle Moorfields and Upper Moorfields lay outside the City, to the north-west of Moorfields proper, in the Manor of Finsbury. The manor was coterminous with the parish of St Luke's (a late sub-division of the parish of St Giles-without-Cripplegate).

=== Neighbouring areas ===
The Metropolitan Borough of Shoreditch (which replaced the parish of Shoreditch, being based on the same boundaries), had an electoral ward named Moorfields, this was adjacent to the former Moorfields (and also the famous Moorfields Eye Hospital) with only a small part of the area ever having been part of Moorfields, and only at an early date.

== History ==
An early name for Moorfields proper appears to have been Moor Mead. The Moor place-name element usually refers to fen environments, and the wet nature of the area persisted, though this was improved by a drainage scheme in 1572.

In the 15th century the monasteries of Charterhouse and St Bartholomews diverted the headwaters of the Walbrook to their sites in the River Fleet catchment. It has been suggested that this caused a significant reduction in the flow of the river, causing Moorfields to become drier, and allowing the Mayor to construct the new Moorgate.

Moorgate was built by upgrading a postern built in 1415, and enlarged in 1472 and 1511. The gate remained poorly connected as there was no direct approach road from the south until 1846, long after the gate and wall were demolished.

After the Great Fire of London in 1666, refugees from the fire evacuated to Moorfields and set up temporary camps there. King Charles II of England encouraged the dispossessed to move on and leave London, but it is unknown how many newly impoverished and displaced persons instead settled in the Moorfields area.

In the early 18th century, Moorfields was the site of sporadic open-air markets, shows, and vendors/auctions. Additionally, the homes near and within Moorfields were places of the poor, and the area had a reputation for harbouring highwaymen, as well as brothels. James Dalton and Jack Sheppard both retreated to Moorfields when in hiding from the law. Parts of the area were known as public cruising areas for gay men. A path in the Upper Moorfields, beside a wall that separated the Upper and Middle Moorfields, was known as Sodomites Walk: the wall was removed in 1752 but the path remains as the south side of Finsbury Square.

In 1780 it was the site of some of the most violent rioting during the Gordon Riots.

The district was once the site of The Foundery, a former cannon foundry turned preaching house and an early centre of Wesleyan Methodism.

A fashionable carpet manufactory was established here by Thomas Moore (c. 1700–1788) in the mid-eighteenth century. Moore's carpet manufactory at Moore Place made a number of fine carpets commissioned by the architect and interior designer Robert Adam for the grand rooms he designed for his wealthy clients. Thomas Moore lived at his home on Chiswell Street until his death. His Moore Park factory remained in operation until 1793, when his daughter, Jane, and her husband, Joseph Foskett, sold the lease to another carpet manufacturer.

== Demise and legacy ==
Much of Moorfields was developed in 1777, when Finsbury Square was developed; the remainder succumbed within the next few decades, notably when Moorfields proper was replaced by the modern Finsbury Circus in 1817.

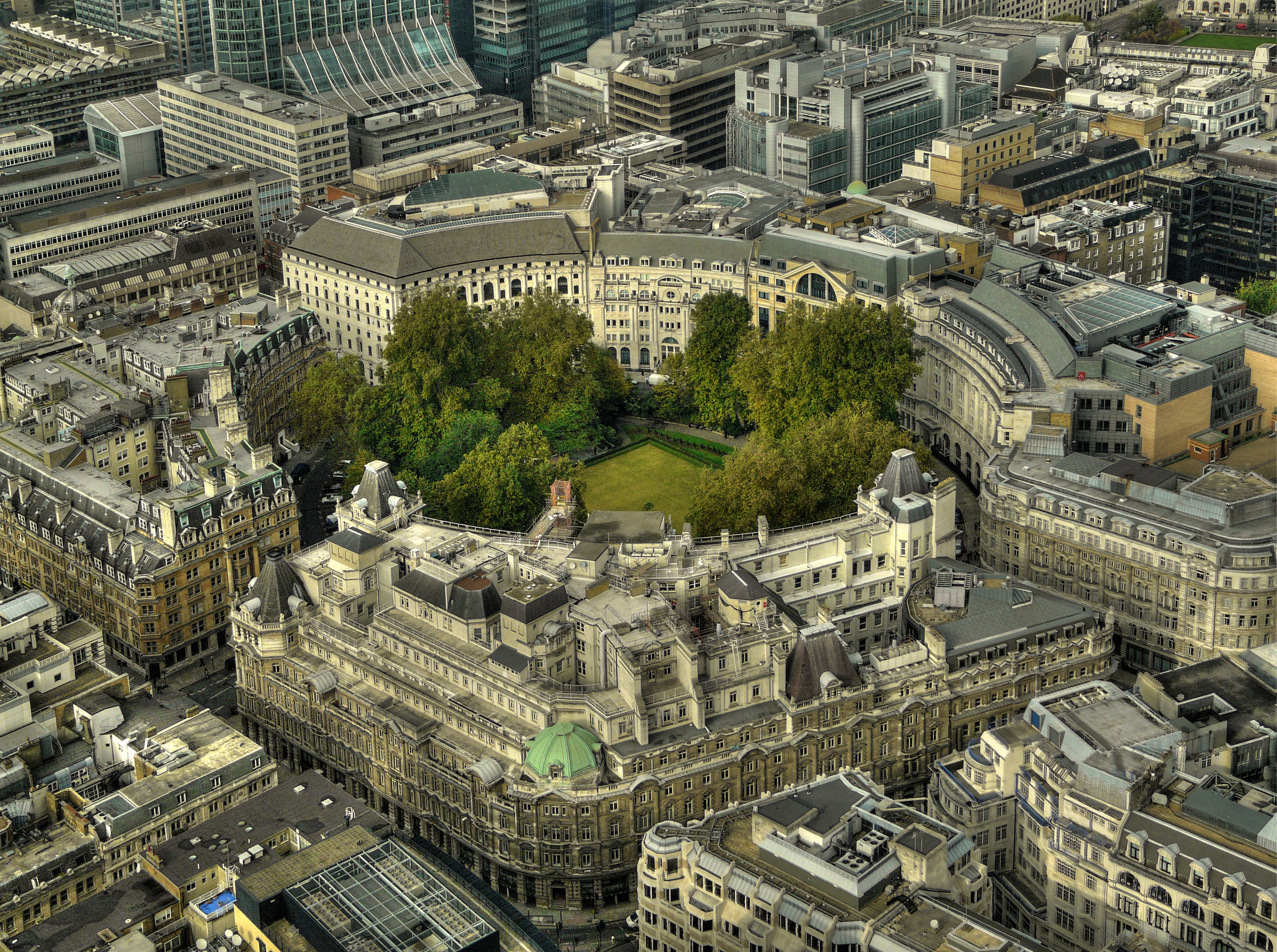
Finsbury Circus occupies the site of Moorfields proper; the Walbrook ran under what is now Blomfield Street, on its eastern side

Today the name survives in the names of Moorfields Eye Hospital (since moved to another site); St Mary Moorfields; Moorfields the short street (on which stands the headquarters of the British Red Cross) parallel with Moorgate (and containing some entrances to Moorgate station); and Moorfields Highwalk, one of the pedestrian "streets" at high level in the Barbican Estate. Moorfields Highwalk is featured in the music video to Robbie Williams' song "No Regrets".
