= Coleman Street =

Ward of the City of London

Coordinates: 51.517°N 0.0889°W

- Ward
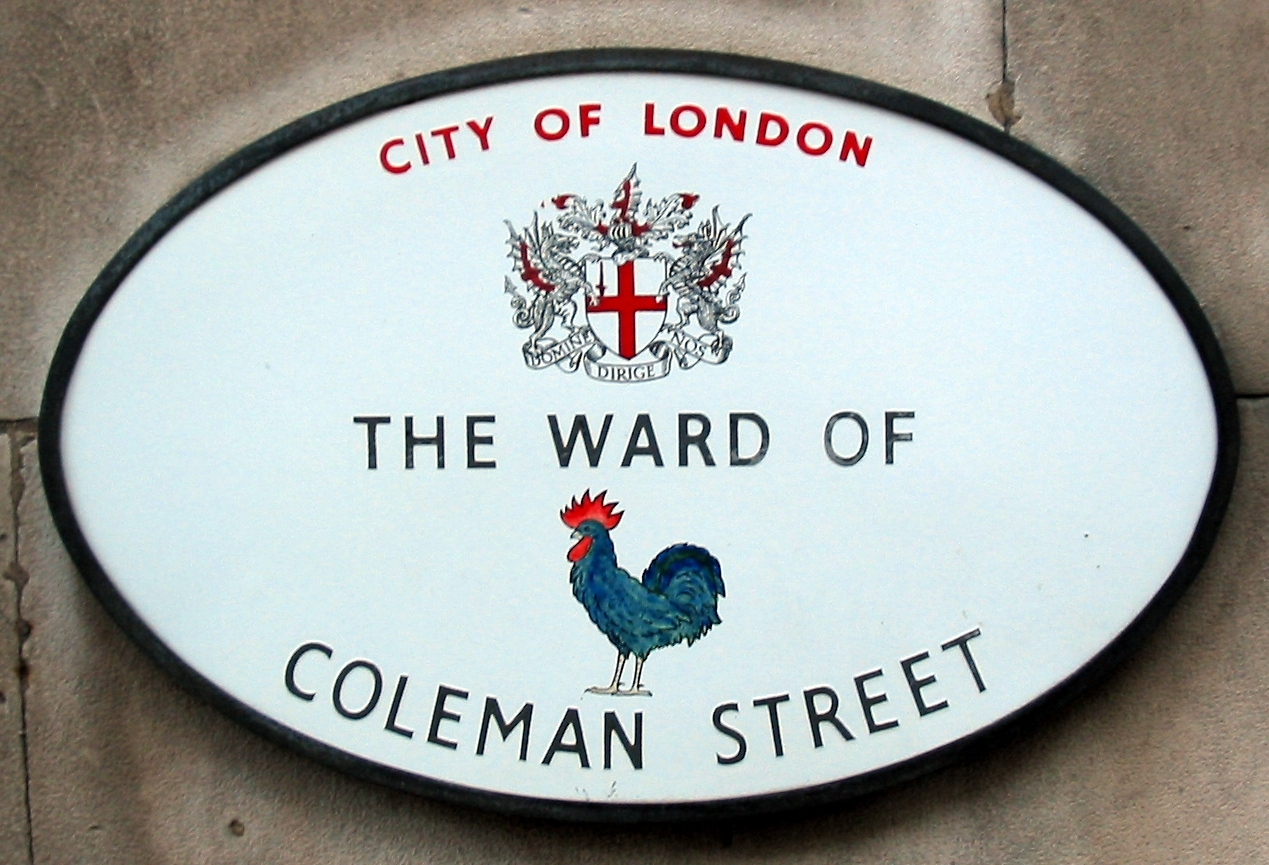
- Ward plaque, with the cock, emblem of Coleman Street Ward.

- Location within Greater London
- Coleman Street ward boundaries since 2013
- OS grid reference: TQ328815
- Sui generis: City of London
- Administrative area: Greater London
- Region: London
- Country: England
- Sovereign state: United Kingdom
- Post town: LONDON
- Postcode district: EC4
- Dialling code: 020
- Police: City of London
- Fire: London
- Ambulance: London
- UK Parliament: Cities of London and Westminster
- London Assembly: City and East

Coleman Street is one of the 25 ancient wards of the City of London, situated on the City's northern boundary with the London Borough of Islington.

The ward, which includes land lying on either side of London's former city wall, takes its name from a road linking Gresham Street and London Wall.

== The ward ==
Modern ward boundary changes, particularly those of 2003, much altered the extent of City wards, so that many no longer closely correlate to their historic areas.

Coleman Street is a very busy ward, having its own long established ward club and newsletter.

=== Etymology ===
The ward takes its name from Coleman Street, which took its name from the charcoal burners who occupied the area in medieval times.

=== Historic ward ===
Traditional extent of the City Wards.

The first mention of the ward appears to have been in 1130, but at that time it was common practice to refer to the Ward by the name of its Alderman. In the 1130 survey, Coleman Street Ward is thought to correspond to Warda Haconis.

The ward contains areas both outside and inside the line of the City's former defensive walls. There was no local gate through the wall until Moorgate, previously a small postern, was built in 1511. Abraham Cowley's 1661 Restoration comedy The Cutter of Coleman Street refers to the area.

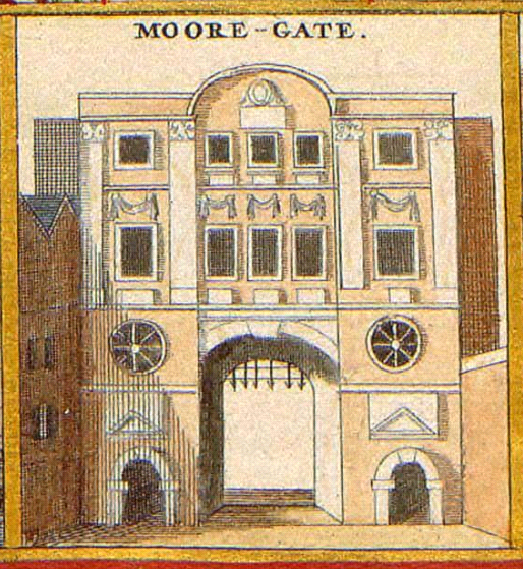
Moorgate in 1650

It appears that the area outside, the once very marshy Lower and Little Moorfields (now mostly occupied by Finsbury Circus and the surrounding buildings), previously part of the Soke of Cripplegate and then the Manor of Finsbury, was added in the 17th century, though it was not developed until 1817.

The Walbrook, known at this point as Deepditch and running on the line of modern Blomfield Street, formed the eastern boundary of Lower Moorfields and the line continues to form the eastern boundary of the part of the ward lying north of the former wall, with the extra-mural ward of Bishopsgate Without lying east of the brook, and the road which now covers it. This section of the Walbrook, around Blomfield Street, was the focus of the phenomena of the Walbrook Skulls, resulting from the immense quantities of Roman-era human heads that were deposited in the river. These are still regularly uncovered during building work.

=== Post 2003 ward ===
Coleman Street borders six City wards and occupies an irregular shape of land bounded to the north by Chiswell Street and Eldon Street; to the east by Blomfield Street, Copthall Avenue and a section of Moorgate; to the south by Lothbury and Gresham Street; and to the west by Basinghall Street, Coleman Street itself, Moor Lane and Silk Street.

=== Politics ===
Coleman Street is one of 25 wards in the City of London, each electing an alderman to the Court of Aldermen and commoners (the City equivalent of a councillor) to the Court of Common Council of the City of London Corporation. Only electors who are Freemen of the City are eligible to stand. The Alderman is Sushil Saluja and its Common Councilmen are Sir Peter Estlin, Deputy Dawn Wright, Philip Kelvin, Shahnan Bakht and John Griffiths.

Warren Stormes Hale, Lord Mayor of London for 1864/65, was the Ward's most notable civic dignitary.

== Features ==
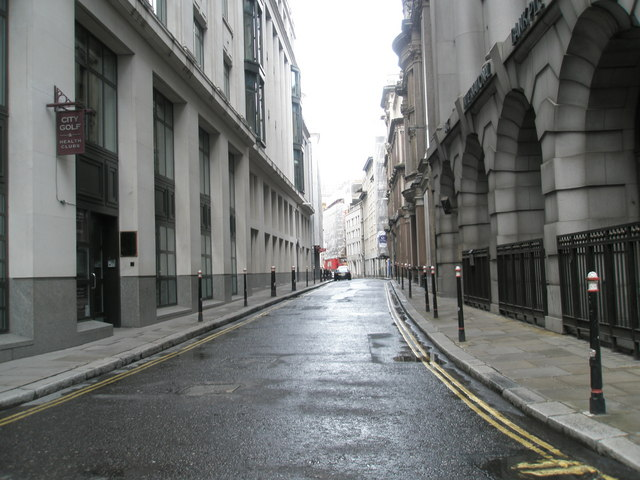
Coleman Street, from which the Ward takes its name

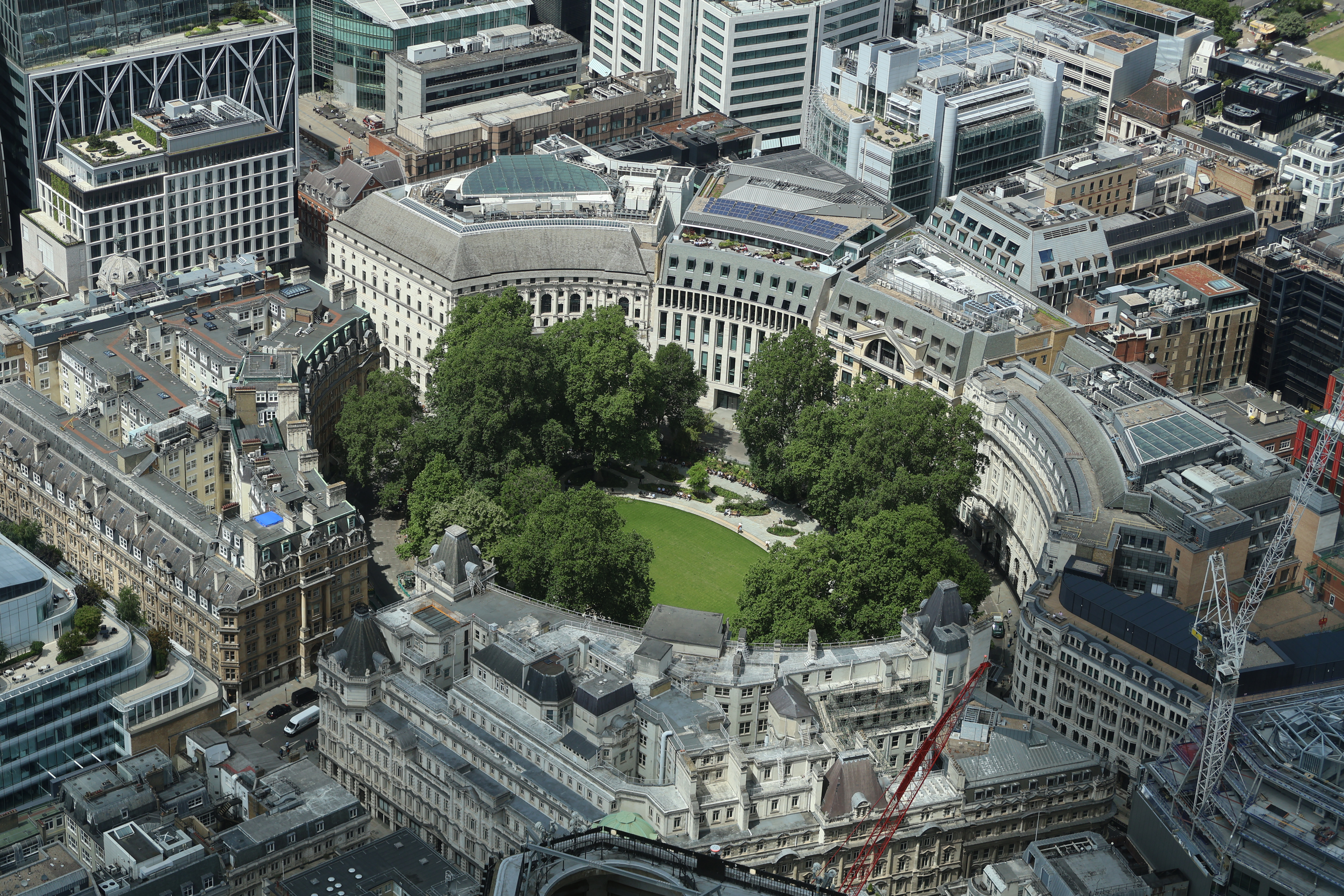
Finsbury Circus, in the north of the ward, is the City's largest public park

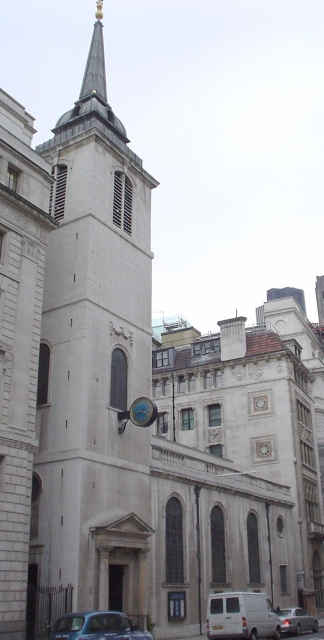
St Margaret Lothbury Church.

Coleman Street is a one-way thoroughfare that runs from Gresham Street to London Wall. The Church of St Stephen Coleman Street used to stand at the southern end of the street, on the western side, until it was completely destroyed in the Blitz not being rebuilt. In the 17th century, St. Stephen's Church became a Puritan stronghold. On the night of 5 January 1642, after the king's failed attempt to arrest Pym, Hampden, Haselrig, Strode and Holles, the Five Members hid on Coleman Street harnessing the support for parliament traditionally afforded by sympathisers in the City of London.

At the northern end of the street stands Armourers' Hall, home to the Worshipful Company of Armourers and Brasiers, and the pineapple-shaped headquarters of Legal & General.

Surrounded by the bustle of business, the City’s "finest oasis of calm" Finsbury Circus, an elliptical square with its own bowling club, is located within the Ward, as is Moorgate station.
