= Finsbury Circus =

Park in the City of London, England

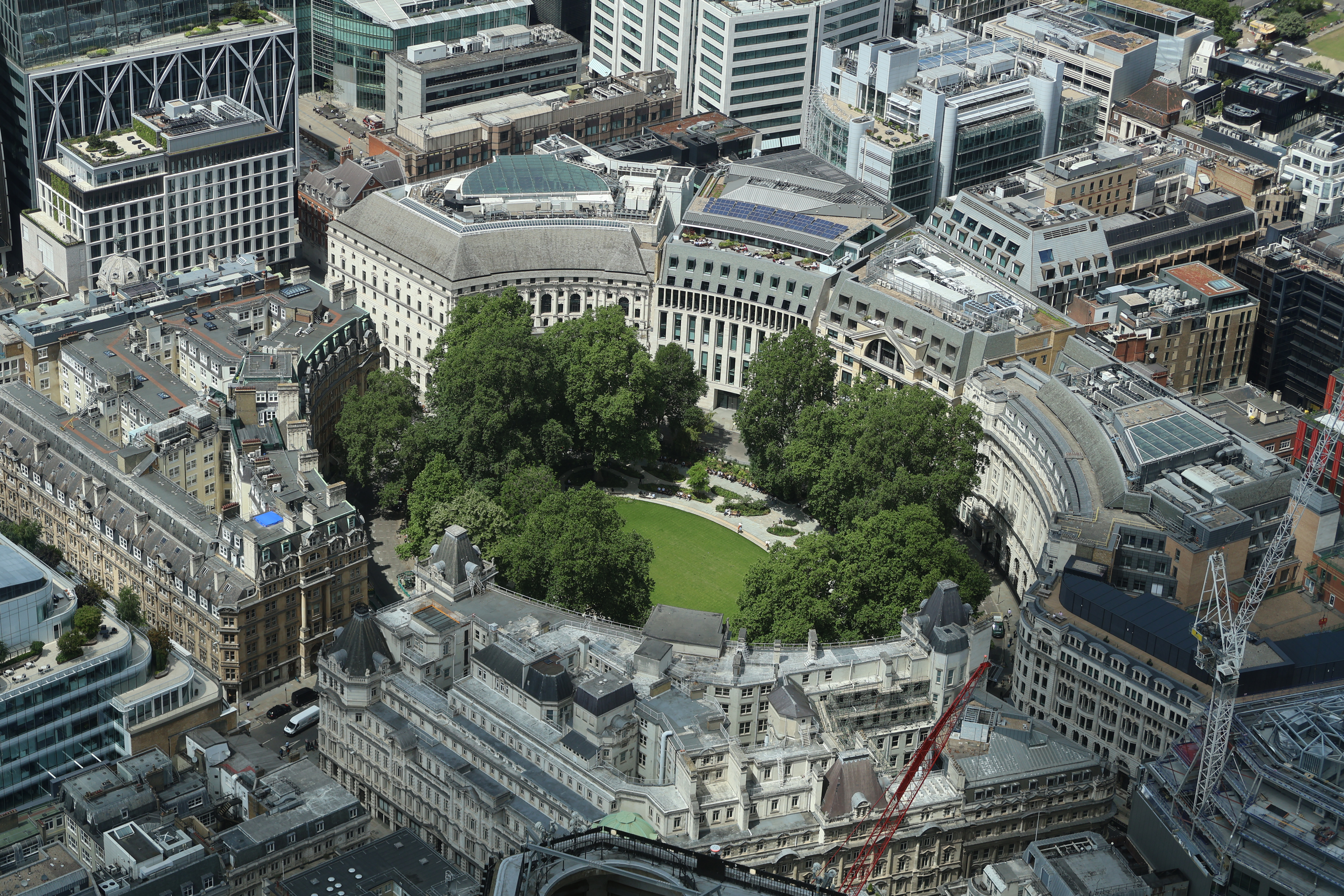
- Finsbury Circus Gardens. Image Credit: Realm
- Interactive map of Finsbury Circus
- Type: Park
- Nearest city: City of London, England
- OS grid: TQ 328 816
- Coordinates: 51.5179°N 0.0864°W
- Area: 2.2 hectares (5.4 acres)
- Created: 1812 (redesigned 2025)

Finsbury Circus is a park in the Coleman Street Ward of the City of London, England. The 2-acre park is the largest public open space within the City's boundaries.

It is not to be confused with Finsbury Square, just north of the City, or Finsbury Park, a few miles away.

== History and features ==
The circus was created in 1812 on the site of the former Lower Moorfields, an area which was originally part of the Manor of Finsbury, a manor which had existed since the 12th century, on which the second Bethlem Royal Hospital had stood since 1675. The "circus" of the name reflects the elliptical shape of the space, similar to the circus venues of ancient Rome, in this case with a long axis lying west-east.

The original houses, the last of which were demolished in 1921, were intended for merchants and gentlemen, but were soon broken up internally and leased for solicitors and other professions. The gardens, featuring a circuit of lime trees, were developed by William Montague to the specifications of the architect George Dance the Younger in 1815. In 1819 the London Institution moved into "ingeniously planned and elegantly detailed" premises designed by William Brooks at the north end of the circus; it closed in 1912 and the buildings were used for the University of London until their demolition in 1936. Fronting onto the circus from the 1820s was the substantial South Place Unitarian Chapel, erected under the leadership of William Johnson Fox; this evolved into Conway Hall Ethical Society.

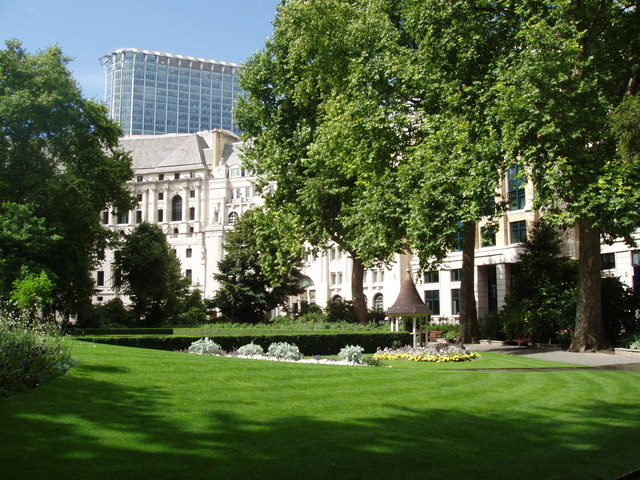
Lutyens' Britannic House seen from the central green

The circus was opened as a public park in the early 20th century, under powers granted to the City of London Corporation in the City of London (Various Powers) Act 1900 (63 & 64 Vict. c. ccxxviii). The gardens had previously been a private space for the use of the freeholders or lease-holders of the surrounding buildings, who objected to their compulsory purchase, fearing that their use by the public would create a nuisance which would lower the value of their property. The campaign to make them a public space was led by Alpheus Morton, deputy-Alderman for Farringdon Without and a member of the Corporations' Streets Committee, and the circus became known with the Corporation as "Morton's Park".

Fronting the northwest quadrant of the oval, with fronts on roads entering the Circus from the west stands Edwin Lutyens's massive Britannic House (1921–25, listed Grade II*), designed for the Anglo-Persian Oil Company, which became BP; its free-standing architectural sculptures are by Francis Derwent Wood. It was built on the site of the last remaining original houses, and is now home to international law firm Stephenson Harwood.

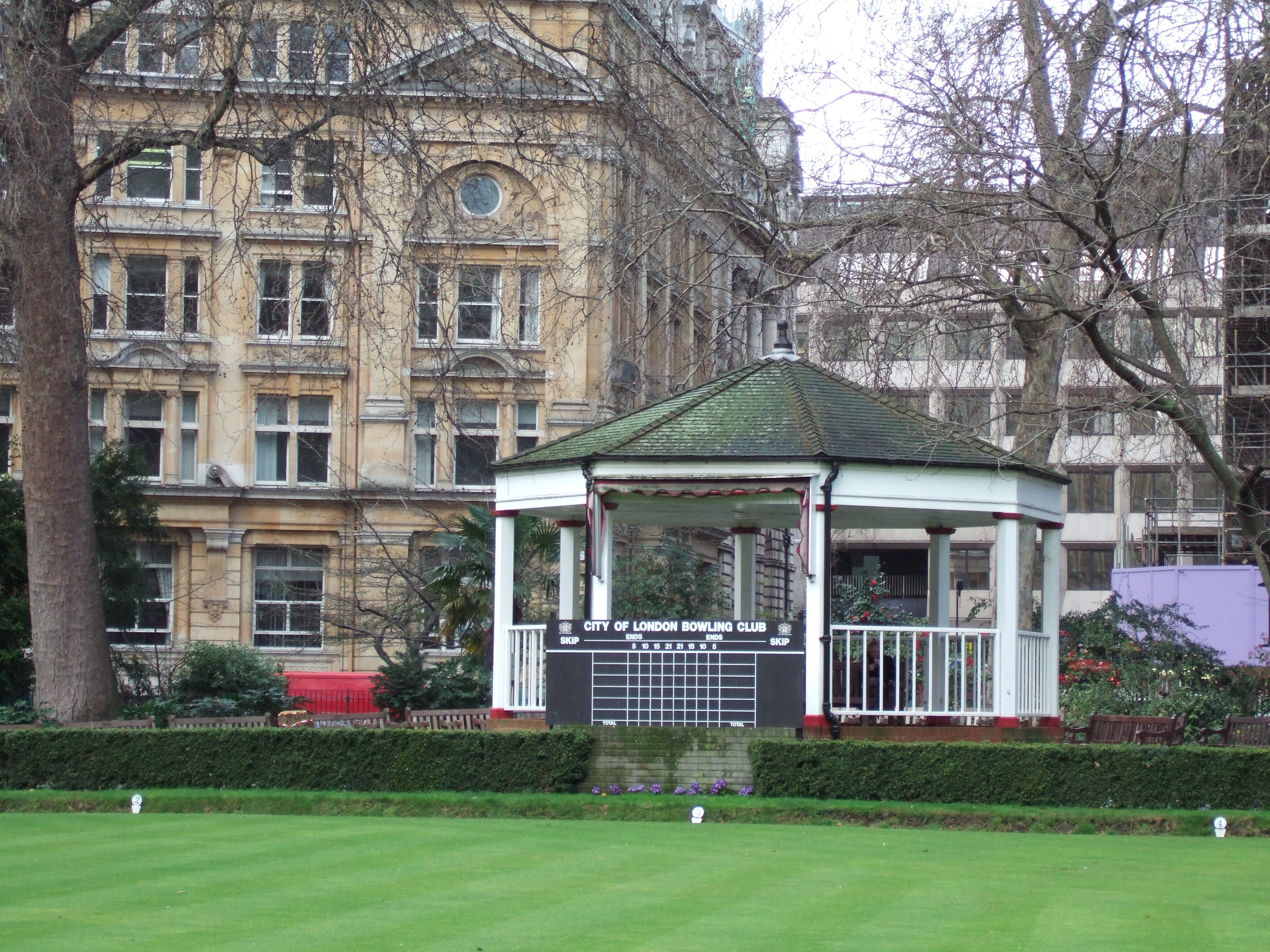
The bowling green at the Circus

Until renovation of the park in 2024, it had a Lawn Bowls club in the centre, which had existed in the gardens since 1925. A bandstand, built in 1955, was located nearby.

The gardens are closed to the public from Monday 20 November 2023 until late 2024, for renovation work to take place. The gardens partially reopened in May 2025.

== Railway stations ==
The nearest Tube station is Moorgate, 150 metres to the west, with Liverpool Street Station about 350 metres to the east.

== Events ==
Finsbury Circus has been used as the finish point for the Miglia Quadrato each year. In recent years it has also played host to the start of the Miglia Quadrato since the event start was removed from Smithfield Market.

== Crossrail ==
During the years 1860–65 Finsbury Circus was threatened with demolition in favour of a railway station; public protests averted the loss, but in 1869 the oval was tunnelled for the Metropolitan Railway.

From 2010 to 2020 the central section of the gardens were taken up for the construction of the Liverpool Street Crossrail station. This included the excavation of a 16m diameter, 42m depth shaft to allow the construction of the platform tunnels beneath. The project was due to be completed in September 2018, but due to mismanagement it missed that deadline, going over budget by £896,700 as of April 2019. The work was finally completed in 2020.

In July 2020, the City of London Corporation announced the park would reopen to the public in August 2020, after a call in June for design proposals to transform the gardens into a sustainable multipurpose space. The winner of the design competition was announced in October 2020 as Architecture00 + Studio Weave, with Realm (previously called ReardonSmith Landscape), whose plan includes a one-storey garden pavilion constructed from natural materials.
