= Finsbury =

District of Central London

Coordinates: 51.5224°N 0.0925°W

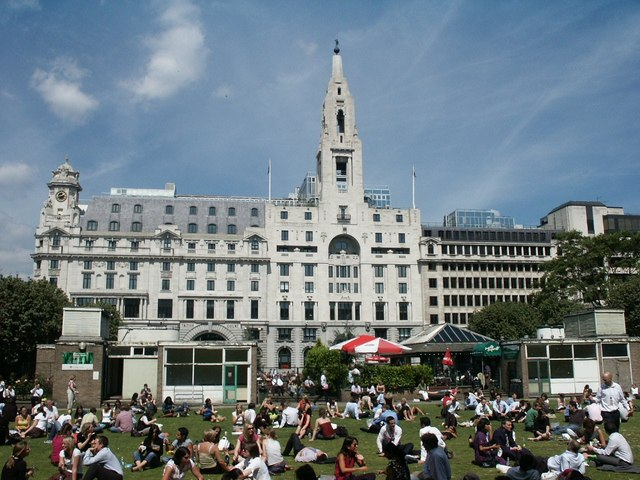
- Finsbury Square, looking north

- The arms of the Metropolitan Borough refer to the London Wall and the northern gates

- Location within Greater London
- OS grid reference: TQ315825
- London borough: Islington
- Ceremonial county: Greater London
- Region: London
- Country: England
- Sovereign state: United Kingdom
- Post town: LONDON
- Postcode district: EC1
- Postcode district: WC1
- Dialling code: 020
- Police: Metropolitan
- Fire: London
- Ambulance: London
- UK Parliament: Islington South and Finsbury
- London Assembly: North East

Finsbury is a district of North-Central London, forming the southeastern part of the London Borough of Islington. It borders the City of London.

The Manor of Finsbury is first recorded as Vinisbir (1231) and means "manor of a man called Finn". Finsbury lay just outside Cripplegate (and on its later construction, Moorgate) in London Wall. At that time, much of the manor was part of the "great fen which washed against the northern wall of the City".

Finsbury gave its name to two larger administrative areas: the Finsbury Division of the Ossulstone Hundred of Middlesex, from the 17th century until 1900, and from 1900 to 1965 the Metropolitan Borough of Finsbury. The Metropolitan Borough included Finsbury (also known as St Luke's) and Clerkenwell.

The area should not be confused with Finsbury Park, a public space roughly 3 miles (5 km) to the north, which gives its name to its surrounding mainly residential area.

== Geography ==
The area lies immediately north of the City of London, and approximates to the part of the London Borough of Islington east of Goswell Road and south of City Road. It also includes a small area north of City Road, focused on the City Road Basin.

The parts of the City of London's Coleman Street Ward that lie outside the line of the former City walls (now mostly covered by Finsbury Circus) were historically part of the Manor of Finsbury and still sometimes described as part of the area.

Finsbury Town Hall and the Finsbury Estate lie further west, in Clerkenwell and are named after the former borough of Finsbury which included both Finsbury and Clerkenwell.

== Origins and administration ==
=== Soke of Cripplegate ===
The Soke of Cripplegate was a landholding outside Cripplegate and Aldersgate. Bordered (in part at least) by the Walbrook to the east, it covered the areas subsequently known as Aldersgate Without and the parish of St Giles-without-Cripplegate (which included Cripplegate Without, the part of Coleman Street Ward north of the wall and the Manor of Finsbury).

Origin of Finsbury: The Soke included Aldersgate Without, Cripplegate Without, the parts of Coleman Street Ward north of the Wall and a much larger area, in the modern London Borough of Islington, that would become the Manor of Finsbury.

The Soke was granted to St. Martin's Le Grand by William the Conqueror in 1068, in exchange for prayers for the souls of his parents. It is thought the estate may be much older dating back to the establishment of the Diocese of London in the 7th century.

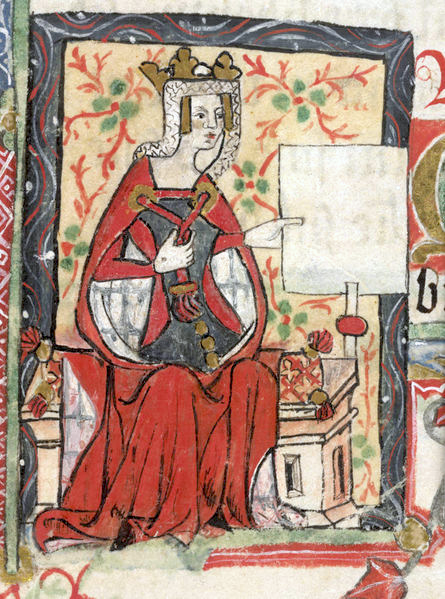
The Empress Matilda wished to develop a northern suburb.

The churches of St Botolph without Aldersgate and St Giles-without-Cripplegate appear to have been built in the early decades of the twelfth century (possibly under the aegis of Matilda of Scotland) and there was very little, if any, development north of the wall before that time. St Martins rights to the Soke were confirmed by the Empress Matilda (daughter of Matilda of Scotland) around 1140. St Martins was permitted to enclose land there to prevent rubbish dumping in the area, but it is thought the Empress' principle intention was to promote planned development of a northern suburb.

The development of streets such as Redcross Street, Whitecross Street, Grub Street, Fore Street, Moor Lane, Chiswell Street and others were subsequently recorded.

=== Manor and parishes ===
It is not entirely clear how the territory and rights of the Soke evolved into the subsequent administrative and ecclesiastical units.

The area covered by the Soke was served by two parishes; the little parish of St Botolph without Aldersgate served the extramural City Ward of Aldersgate Without, while the parish of St Giles-without-Cripplegate served the extramural City Ward of Cripplegate Without and the Manor (estate) of Finsbury. In the 17th century, Little and Lower Moorfields, previously in the Manor of Finsbury and Parish of St Giles, was transferred to the Coleman Street Ward of the City of London (and also to the parish of St Stephen Coleman Street for religious purposes). This meant that Coleman Street Ward also possessed an extramural area.

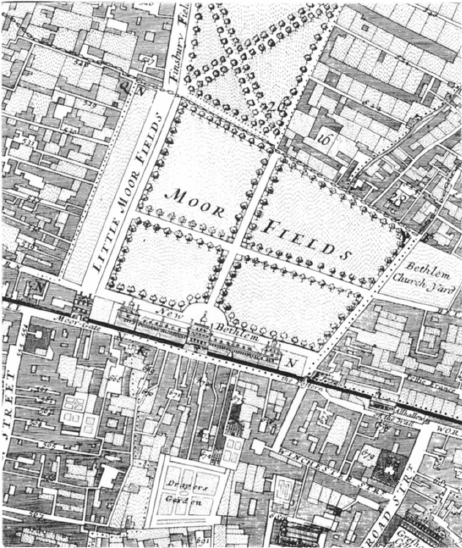
Lower Moorfields, north London in 1676, including the re-sited Bethlem Hospital. London's Wall and the Moorgate are clearly shown, and some of the administrative boundaries can also be discerned.

From mid-12th century the Manor of Finsbury was owned by St Paul's cathedral and managed as a Prebendary Manor to provide a prebend (a stipend of money or goods) to support an ecclesiastic person such as a canon, or an institution. For a long time the prebendary income went to Holywell Priory in nearby Shoreditch, so the estate became known as the Prebend of Halliwell and Finsbury, though the Priory itself did not lie adjacent to the prebendary manor or form part of it.

The prebendary manor of Finsbury was, from 1315, leased by the Lord Mayor of London, so that after that the formal title of the Mayors has been Mayor of London and Lord of Finsbury. The mayoral manor house, Finsbury Court, lay on the junction of Chiswell Street and Finsbury Pavement.

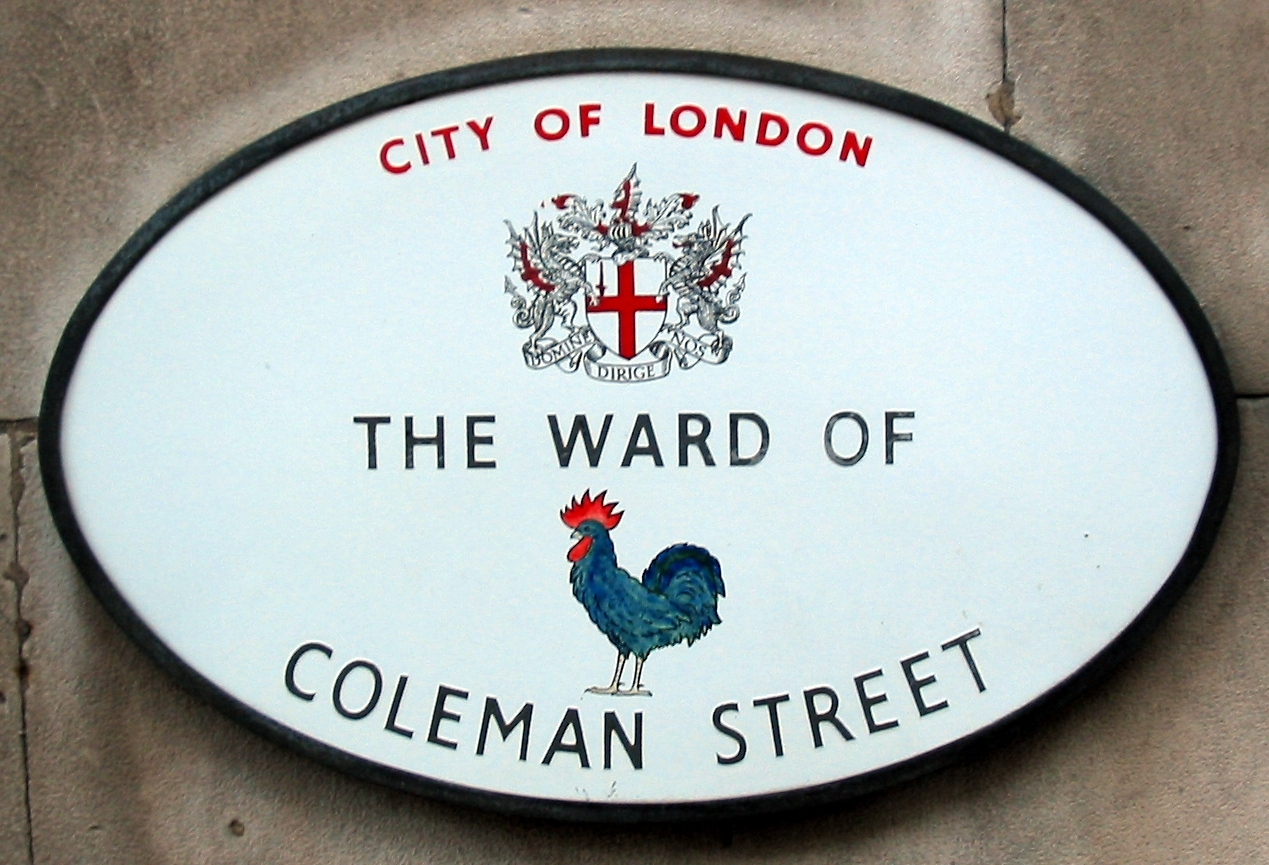
The parts of Coleman Street Ward north of the Wall, were part of the Manor of Finsbury.

In this way the part of St Giles parish, Cripplegate Without, that was part of the city was also known as The Freedom and governed by the Mayor as a part of, or a dependency of the city. The remaining part, The Manor of Finsbury, was also known as The Lordship, where the Mayor's position was that of a lessee, albeit with the title Lord of the Manor of Finsbury.

Other accounts suggest the Manor passed to the Lord Mayors later, being made over their use by Richard II, in gratitude for the killing of Wat Tyler by Mayor William Walworth at Smithfield in 1381.

In 1733, the growth of the local population, led to the part of St Giles-without-Cripplegate outside the city, the area which had been the Manor of Finsbury, being made an independent parish, known as St Luke's, after the parish church.

=== Latter administration and representation ===
The parts of the parish of St Giles outside of the city (originally the Manor of Finsbury, later organised as the Parish of St Luke) were part of the Hundred of Ossulstone in Middlesex. By the 17th century, population growth made this unit inefficient, so it was sub-divided with the area north of the walls becoming part of a new Finsbury Division which handled the responsibilities previously managed by the Hundred. Parish-level institutions continued to manage the Poor Law and ecclesiastical matters.

In 1832 the parliamentary borough of Finsbury was created to represent the area in parliament. This area loosely approximated to the Finsbury division, but also included parts of west London. In 1857 Finsbury Park was opened some three miles north, for the enjoyment of the residents of this parliamentary borough.

The wards of the Metropolitan Borough preserved the boundary between Finsbury (St Luke's) and Clerkenwell. Finsbury comprised the five eastern wards.

The Metropolitan Borough of Finsbury in the County of London was created in 1900, covering the area of Finsbury (also known as St Luke's) and Clerkenwell, with Finsbury Town Hall located on Rosebery Avenue, Clerkenwell. In 1938, Dr. Chuni Lal Katial was elected mayor of Finsbury, making him the first Asian mayor in the United Kingdom.

The Borough's coat of arms included an embattled chief (top of the shield) representing the London Wall, a Barbican representing the three northern gates (Aldersgate, Cripplegate and Moorgate) and a Winged Bull, the heraldic symbol of St Luke.

In 1965 the area merged with Islington to form the new London Borough of Islington, though Finsbury Circus remains part of the City of London.

== History ==
=== Growth ===
Urbanisation was slow, despite the building of a new gate in the adjacent London Wall, Moorgate, in 1511. In 1665 the Bunhill Fields burial ground was opened in the area.

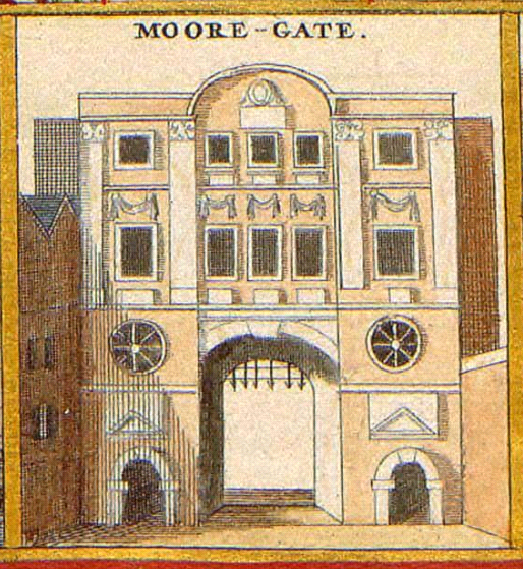
Moorgate was built in 1511, the last gate to be created in the originally Roman wall. The creation of the gate encouraged development to the north of the wall.

Building on Finsbury Fields began in the late 17th century. The parish church of St Luke's was built in 1732–33, development was accelerated by the building of the City Road in 1765, and at the end of the 18th century a residential suburb was built with its centre at Finsbury Square. Little and Lower Moorfields remained open until Finsbury Circus was developed after 1815.

=== Military history ===
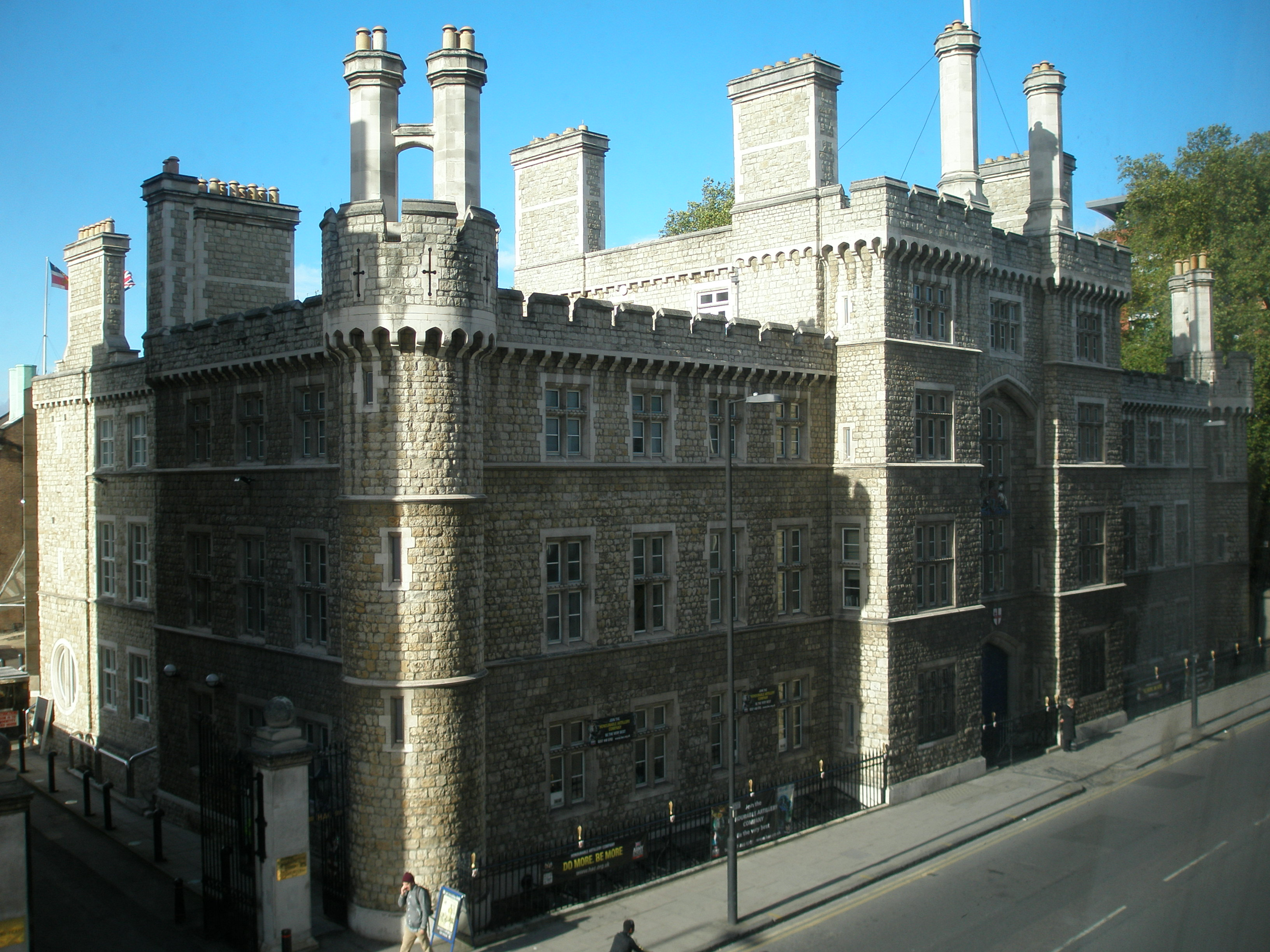
Finsbury Barracks

In 1641 the Honourable Artillery Company moved to Finsbury, where it still remains. The City of London Yeomanry, founded at the time of the Second Boer War, made its headquarters in Finsbury Square.

In 1862 Finsbury gave its name to a volunteer infantry unit, the Finsbury Rifles, which recruited in both Finsbury and Clerkenwell, and saw distinguished service in several conflicts.

=== Medical district ===
Before Harley Street rose to prominence, Finsbury was London's principal medical district. In the mid-19th century it was home to a large number of hospitals, but now only Moorfields Eye Hospital remains.

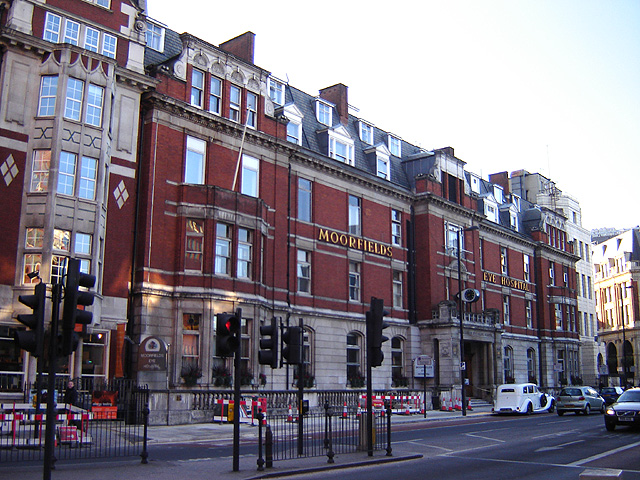
Finsbury Moorfields Eye Hospital

The area included the following hospitals:

- Royal Hospital for Diseases of the Chest
- Royal London Ophthalmic Hospital (Moorfields)
- St Luke's Hospital for Lunatics
- French Huguenot Hospital
- St Mark's Hospital for Fistula and other Diseases of the Rectum
- Holborn & Finsbury Poor Law Union
- Bethlem Hospital, on the site of what is now Finsbury Circus

== Famous residents ==
- Charles Gordon, cricketer and grandson of the founder of Gordon's Gin
- Violet Kray, mother of the gangster Kray brothers. Twins Ronnie and Reggie were arrested at her flat in Braithwaite House, Finsbury, in connection with gangland crimes including murder and fraud on 8 May 1968.
- Eric Maxon, Shakespearean and early film actor, died in Finsbury
- Arthur Mullard, comic actor
- Dadabhai Naoroji, Indian politician

== Points of interest ==
- St Luke Old Street (also known as Finsbury St Luke), completed in 1733 as the parish church, now used as a concert venue by the London Symphony Orchestra.
- Ironmonger Row Baths
- Whitecross Street Market
- Moorfields Eye Hospital
- Artillery Ground, an open space and historic cricket venue.
- Bunhill Fields, a former burial ground and open space.
- Finsbury Square
- King Square Gardens
- City Road Basin, a canal basin on the Regent's Canal.
- Finsbury Library, which also houses the Islington Local History Centre, the Islington Museum, and the Islington Computer Skills Centre. The library was originally built to be the Central Library of the Borough of Finsbury, before the merger into Islington.
- Golden Lane Estate
- City, University of London
- Finsbury Circus, in Coleman Street Ward, in the City of London.
