= 21 Moorfields =

Office tower in London

- 21 Moorfields incorporates the main entrance to Moorgate station

General information
- Type: Office
- Location: London, England
- Coordinates: 51.518502°N 0.08975°W

Height
- Roof: 79 m (259 ft)

Technical details
- Floor count: 17

Design and construction
- Architecture firm: WilkinsonEyre
- Main contractor: McAlpine

21 Moorfields is an office development in the Moorgate area on the northern boundary of the City of London. Completed in 2023, the building is 17 storeys and rises to 79 m (259 ft) in height.

== History and description ==
In 2012, Landsec commissioned WilkinsonEyre to provide designs for a large new office building on the site in response to the planned arrival of the Elizabeth Line. Provision had been made in the Crossrail project plans for sufficient support for a building on top of the station.

Three 1970s office buildings were cleared away on the site with original plans for two buildings, although plans for Deutsche Bank to move their headquarters onto the site and through Lendlease were able to negotiate for a single building instead, providing more space. Lendlease acquired the building for £800 million, with Landsec remaining responsible for the completion of construction, carried out by McAlpine, which saw a number of delays before final completion in 2023.

The final design requires trusses distributing the weight concentrated on a few strategically placed piles whose positions are restrained by the railway tracks below. The new development was however able to reuse some of the foundations from the earlier buildings. 21 Moorfields is one of a number of newer offices in the Moorgate area, following the 2000 refurbishment of Citypoint, Moor House, completed 2004, Ropemaker Place completed 2009 and 20 Ropemaker Street completed the same year. The highrise residential building The Heron is also nearby.

== See also ==
- 20 Ropemaker Street
- Citypoint
