= Moorgate =

Coordinates: 51°31′03″N 0°05′19″W

- Location within Greater London
- OS grid reference: TQ327811
- Sui generis: City of London
- Administrative area: Greater London
- Region: London
- Country: England
- Sovereign state: United Kingdom
- Post town: LONDON
- Postcode district: EC2
- Dialling code: 020
- Police: City of London
- Fire: London
- Ambulance: London
- UK Parliament: Cities of London and Westminster
- London Assembly: City and East

Moorgate was one of the City of London's northern gates in its defensive wall, the last to be built. The gate took its name from the Moorfields, an area of marshy land that lay immediately north of the wall.

The gate was demolished in 1762, but gave its name to a major street, Moorgate, laid out in 1834. The area around the street and around Moorgate station is informally also referred to as Moorgate. The Moorgate district is home to many financial institutions and has many notable historic and contemporary buildings.

Moorgate station was the site of the Moorgate tube crash of 1975, when a Northern City Line train failed to stop and hit a brick wall killing 43. This resulted in systems, known as Moorgate control, being installed on the Underground in order to stop trains at dead-ends.

== The gate ==
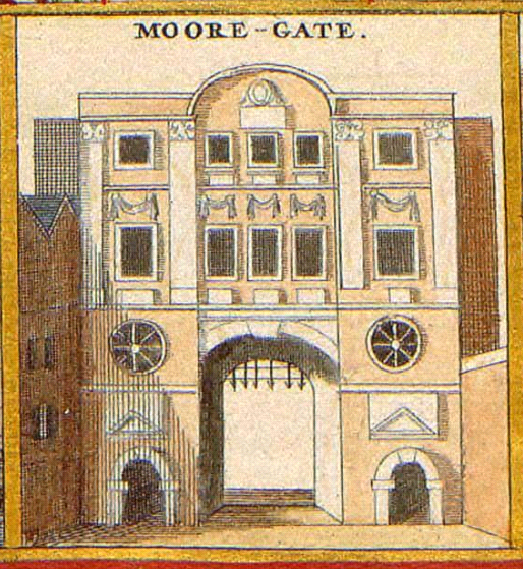
The Moorgate, 1650

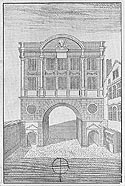
An engraving showing Moorgate before it was demolished in 1762

The earliest descriptions of Moorgate date from the early 15th century, where it was described as only a postern in the London city wall. Located between Bishopsgate and Cripplegate and leading to a marshy open space known as Moorfields, it was not one of the larger or more important of the city gates.

In 1415 an ordinance enacted that the old postern be demolished. It was replaced with a newer and larger structure located farther to the west, which included a wooden gate to be shut at night. This gate was enlarged again in 1472 and 1511, and then damaged in the Great Fire of London in 1666. Although the City gates had ceased to have any modern function apart from decoration, it was replaced along with Ludgate, Newgate, and Temple Bar with a stone gate in 1672.

The Moorgate linked the parts of Coleman Street Ward on either side of London's Wall

Moorgate and the Wall originally formed the northern boundary of Coleman Street Ward. It appears that the area outside, the once very marshy Lower and Little Moorfields (now mostly occupied by Finsbury Circus and the surrounding buildings), previously part of the Manor of Finsbury were added in the 17th century, (Note: The Ward did not extend beyond the wall at the time of John Stows survey of 1603 – but it did by the time of Ogilby and Morgans map of 1676) though it was not developed until 1817.

Moorgate was demolished with most of the other London city wall gates in 1761/2, and the resulting stone was sold for £166 to the City of London Corporation to support the starlings of the newly widened centre arch of the London Bridge.

Little Moorgate was a postern opposite Little Winchester Street leading into Moorfields. It had been demolished by 1755, but gave its name to a street that was later removed for the building of a railway.

== Moorgate Street and locality ==
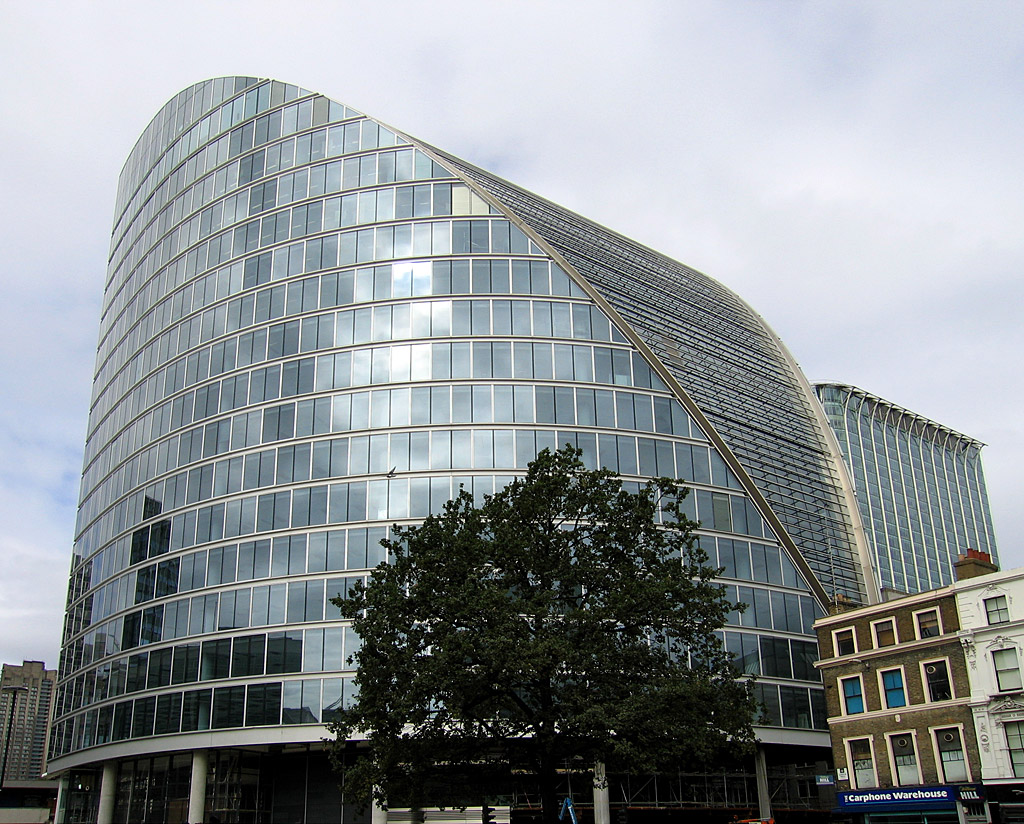
Moor House

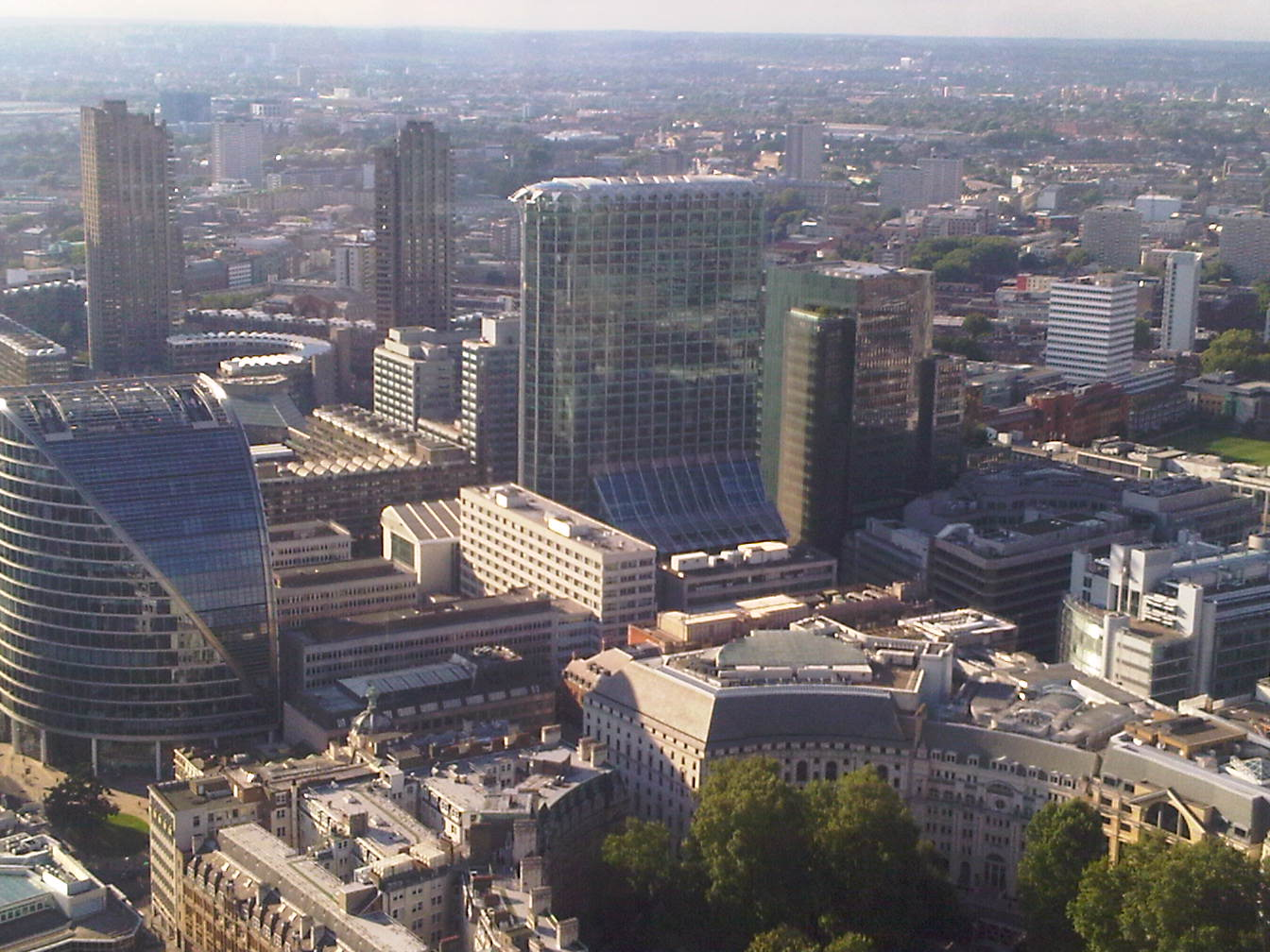
CityPoint

The area around the former gate, Moorgate Street and Moorgate station is referred to informally as the Moorgate area. This locale roughly approximates to the Coleman Street Ward of the City of London.

The contemporary street of Moorgate runs north from Princes Street and Lothbury at the back of the Bank of England, across the road named London Wall and the location of the old gate, and then continues north. After leaving the City of London in the direction of the London Borough of Islington, the street is known as Finsbury Pavement (which at one time was known as Moor Fields Pavement) and then City Road. The street was constructed around 1846 as one of the new approaches to London Bridge. While the street was formally known as "Moorgate Street", the street part of the name eventually fell out of use.

The Chartered Accountants' Hall, on Moorgate Place, is the home of the Institute of Chartered Accountants in England and Wales.

The Guildhall is connected to Moorgate station via Bassishaw Highwalk. The Guildhall is the home of the City of London Corporation and the centre of City government since the Middle Ages. Adjacent and internally connected to the Guildhall is the Guildhall Art Gallery, which houses the art collection of the City of London. It occupies a stone building in a semi-Gothic style which was completed in 1999 to replace an earlier building destroyed in 1941.

The Moorfields were an extensive area of open land, partly in the City of London, partly in the Manor of Finsbury. The Lower Moorfields was home to the Bethlem Royal Hospital (also known as Bedlam, Europe's oldest psychiatric hospital) from 1676 to 1815.

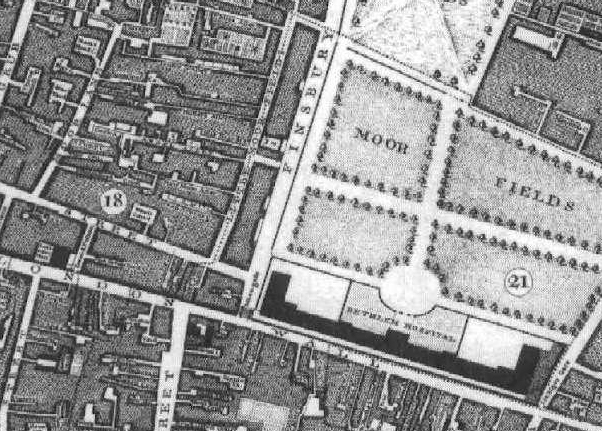
Rocque e1 MoorgateCrop

The Lower Moorfields was developed in 1817, with the building of Finsbury Circus. Finsbury Circus includes a number of classical buildings surrounding an oval-shaped circus. The gardens in the centre of the circus occupy a 5,000-square-metre (1.2-acre) plot enclosed by railings, and include the lawn of the City of London Bowls Club.

Moorgate is also the birthplace of John Keats, one of the principal poets in the English Romantic movement. Keats was born in 1795 in the Swan and Hoop Inn at 199 Moorgate, where his father was an ostler. The pub is now called "The John Keats at The Globe", having previously been known as "The Moorgate Coffee House", "The Moorgate" and "The John Keats at Moorgate", only a few yards from Moorgate station.

A new commercial development on Moorgate, known as Moor House, opened in 2005. The building is located at the corner of Moorgate and London Wall, and was designed by Foster and Partners. The building has 28,000 m^{2} (300,000 sq ft) of office space in 19 storeys, and is built in the location of a smaller office building built in the 1960s known as Moor House. A 36 m shaft under the building incorporates part of Crossrail's new station and ticket hall serving Liverpool Street.

During the 1940s-60s, HM Customs and Excise investigation staff were based at Moorgate Hall, 153 Moorgate.

There is a campus of the London Metropolitan University, formerly a polytechnic, and part of the London Guildhall University, on Moorgate. The campus houses its business school, a library, and other administrative facilities.

A number of large buildings are being planned or already built in the neighbouring streets. These include 112 m (367 ft) residential skyscraper at Milton Court (The Heron), and office towers including the 127 m (417 ft) CityPoint, 95 m (312 ft) Ropemaker Place and 112 m (367 ft) 20 Ropemaker Street.

== Nearest places ==
- Barbican Estate

== Nearby rail and Tube ==
National Rail

- Liverpool Street station
- Moorgate station

London Underground

- Moorgate station: Northern line (city branch), Circle, Hammersmith & City and Metropolitan lines

== Bus routes ==
Moorgate is served by the following bus routes: 21, 43 (24 hour), 76 (24 hour), 100, 141, 153, 214 (24 hour), 271 (24 hour) and Night Bus route N551 (Towards Gallions Reach on a temporary diversion)
