= Lothbury Station =

Lothbury Station may refer to:

- Lothbury tube station
- Lothbury Telegraph Station, the hub of the British Telegraph system.
