= 20 Ropemaker Street =

Skyscraper in London

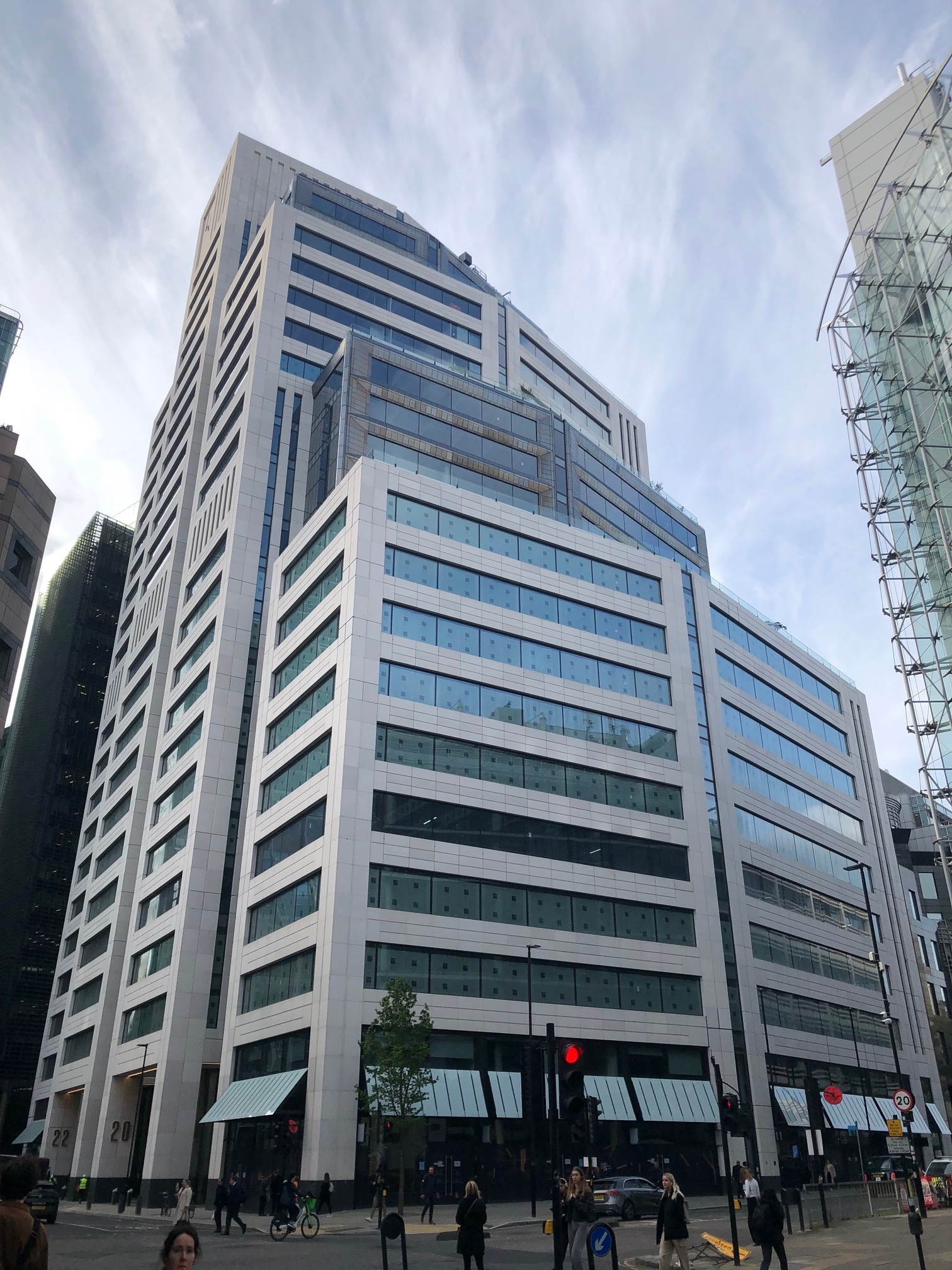

General information
- Type: Office
- Location: London, England
- Coordinates: 51.519796°N 0.088243°W

Height
- Roof: 112 m (367 ft)

Technical details
- Floor count: 26

Design and construction
- Architecture firm: Make Architects
- Structural engineer: Waterman
- Main contractor: Skanska

20 Ropemaker Street is a highrise office tower on Ropemaker Street. Just outside the northern boundary of the City of London, it stands in the Borough of Islington. It was completed in 2023 and rises to 112 m (367 ft) over 26 storeys.

== Background ==
In 2017, planning permission was granted for the tower, to be built by Skanska to the designs of Make Architects. It joins an emerging highrise cluster around Moorgate station including Citypoint, Ropemaker Place and residential tower The Heron.

In 2024, ISG were tipped to fit-out the building for Linklaters, which was to serve as the latter's new global headquarters after nearly 30 years at One Silk Street, although by 2024 the contract had instead been given to Structure Tone.

== Design ==
The building is primarily an office development but also provides retail space on its ground floor. It consists of a stepped design, reaching up to 112 m (367 ft) in height. Clad in limestone, it was the first limestone-faced building to surpass the height of St Paul's Cathedral. It was awarded "outstanding" and "platinum" certifications by BREEAM.

== See also ==
- Citypoint
- Ropemaker Place
- List of tallest buildings and structures in London
