= Whalebone (disambiguation) =

Whalebone or baleen is a filter-feeder system inside the mouths of baleen whales.

Whalebone may also refer to:

- Whalebone (album), by Marc Douglas Berardo
- Whalebone (horse), a racehorse
- Whalebone (eatery), a former pub in London, famous as a meeting place for 17th century radicals
- Whalebone Vineyard, a California wine estate
- Whalebone (ward), an electoral ward in London
