= Moor House =

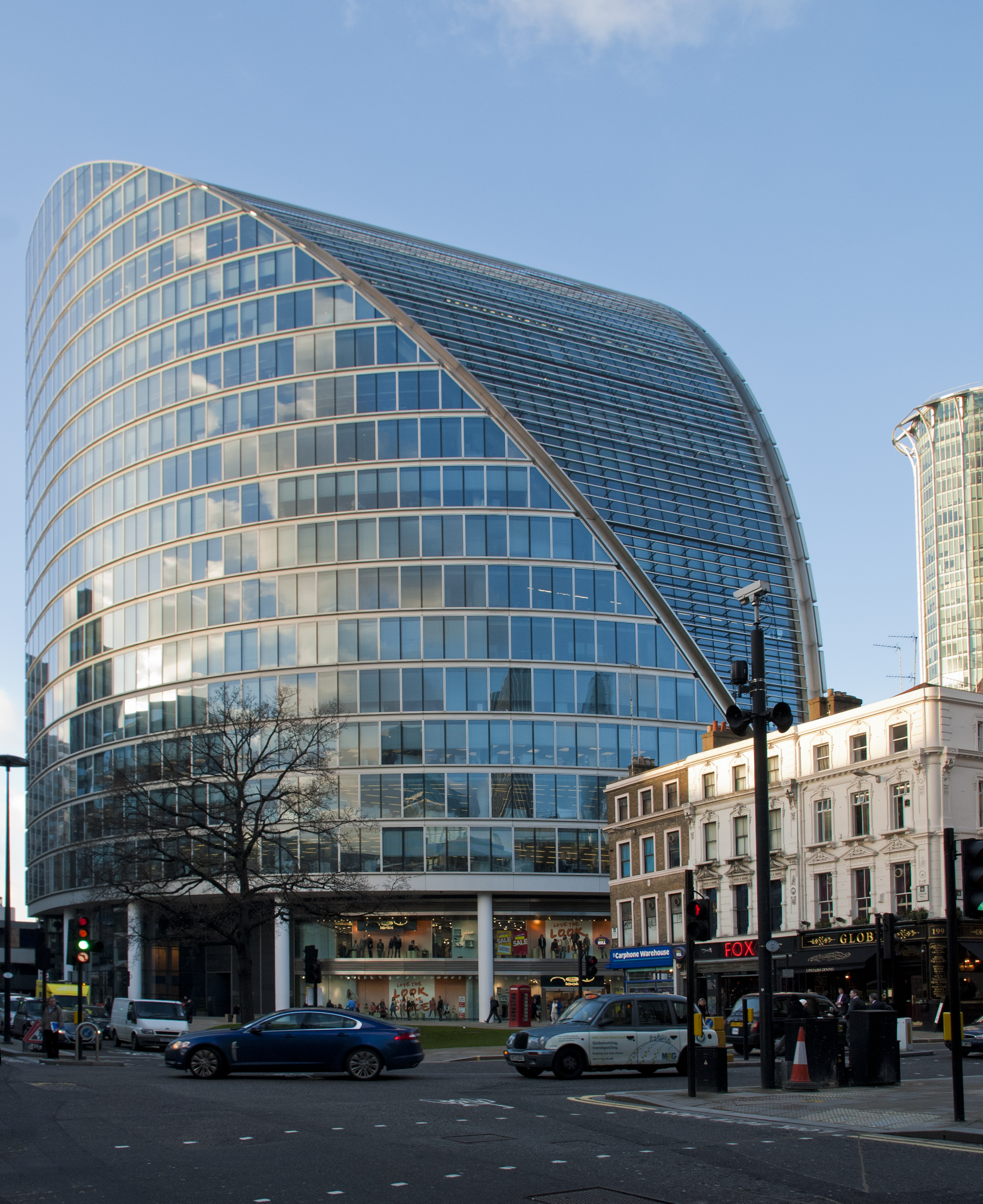

General information
- Type: Office
- Location: London, EC2; United Kingdom
- Coordinates: 51.5178°N 0.0896°W
- Completed: 2004

Height
- Roof: 84 metres (276 ft)

Technical details
- Floor count: 19
- Floor area: 322,833 sq ft (29,992.2 m^{2})

Design and construction
- Architect: Foster and Partners

Moor House is a large office building on London Wall in Moorgate, located in the City of London.

It is located on the northern edge of the financial district and is one of the largest buildings in the area, standing 84 metres (276 ft) tall and with 29,000 square metres (310,000 sq ft) of floor space.

Completed in 2004, it was the first building to be designed for the forthcoming Crossrail, with a ventilation shaft to the station underneath the building. When built, it had the deepest foundations in London, which reach down 57 metres (187 ft) and are specifically designed to withstand further tunneling below it in the future. The building cost £182 million to construct and was designed by Sir Norman Foster. Tenants include CLSA, Unicredit, Peel Hunt, TT International.

== History ==
The site was previously home to a 1960s modernist office block. A postmodern redevelopment proposal was made in 1991 by Terry Farrell and Partners, the firm that designed the nearby Alban Gate.

In April 1999 the building was involved in a dispute over whether it should be granted planning permission.

== Redevelopment of the area ==
A number of other large buildings are being planned on sites nearby. These include a 43-storey, 140-metre (460 ft) residential tower at Milton Court. 95-metre (312 ft) office tower Ropemaker Place was also developed by British Land.

== Nearest tube stations ==
- Moorgate tube station
- Liverpool Street station

== See also ==
- CityPoint
- Tall buildings in London
