= Lothbury tube station =

Unbuilt London Underground station

Lothbury
- Interactive map of Lothbury

General information
- Location: City of London
- Number of platforms: 2

Railway companies
- Original company: Great Northern & City Railway

Other information
- Coordinates: 51.5147°N 0.0897°W

Lothbury was an authorised underground railway station planned by the Great Northern & City Railway (GN&CR) but never built. It was to be located in Lothbury, in the City of London, the historic nucleus and financial centre of London.

In November 1901, the GN&CR published a notice of its intention to present a private bill to Parliament seeking permission for an extension of the company's tunnels then under construction between Finsbury Park and Moorgate Street. The bill proposed a short, 270 yd (250 m), southward continuation of the line to Lothbury, which would become the southern terminus in place of Moorgate Street (now known simply as Moorgate) as originally planned. The bill received royal assent on 8 August 1902 as the Great Northern and City Railway Act 1902.

Map of Railways in City of London, 1905

The station was to have been built entirely below ground, with access to the street by lift and subways to the corners of the junction where Lothbury, Moorgate and Princes Street converge. The station was to have had five lifts, and a "moving staircase" was also proposed. One peculiarity of the scheme was that the running tunnels between Moorgate Street and Lothbury stations were to have been shorter than the platform tunnels at the two stations, meaning that the front of a full-length train would have arrived at Lothbury before the rear would have left Moorgate Street. The line could not be extended any further south because the City & South London Railway had taken the only possible alignment of tunnels from Moorgate into Princes Street, which required one tube above the other. Under Moorgate, the GN&CR's tunnels lay above the C&SLR's; further tunnels beneath Princes Street might cause subsidence, while the alternative was blocked by the Bank of England. Work began on the Moorgate Street to Lothbury section but was abandoned almost immediately, with the tunnelling shield left in place at the end of the southbound tunnel, just south of Moorgate Street.

The Great Northern and City Railway Act 1907, which received Royal Assent on 26 July 1907, granted additional time for the construction of the Lothbury extension but the money could not be raised and no further work was done.

In 1913, the Metropolitan Railway (MR) purchased the GN&CR and revived the Lothbury proposal in a modified form as part of a number of plans to connect the GN&CR to the Waterloo & City Railway (W&CR) and the MR itself. When the Metropolitan Railway Act 1913 was passed on 15 August 1913, neither of the proposals for connections were permitted, but Lothbury station was approved, again as the terminus station. In 1914, the Metropolitan Railway introduced revised proposals for its connections between the GN&CR, the Metropolitan and the Waterloo and City, which removed the need for the station at Lothbury. Although those connections were never realised, the concept of a Lothbury station was not revived again.

Preceding station	London Underground	Following station
Moorgate	Metropolitan Railway; Northern City Line	Terminus
