= Whalebone (eatery) =

Leveller meeting place in London

Coordinates: 51°30′52.98″N 0°5′16.48″W

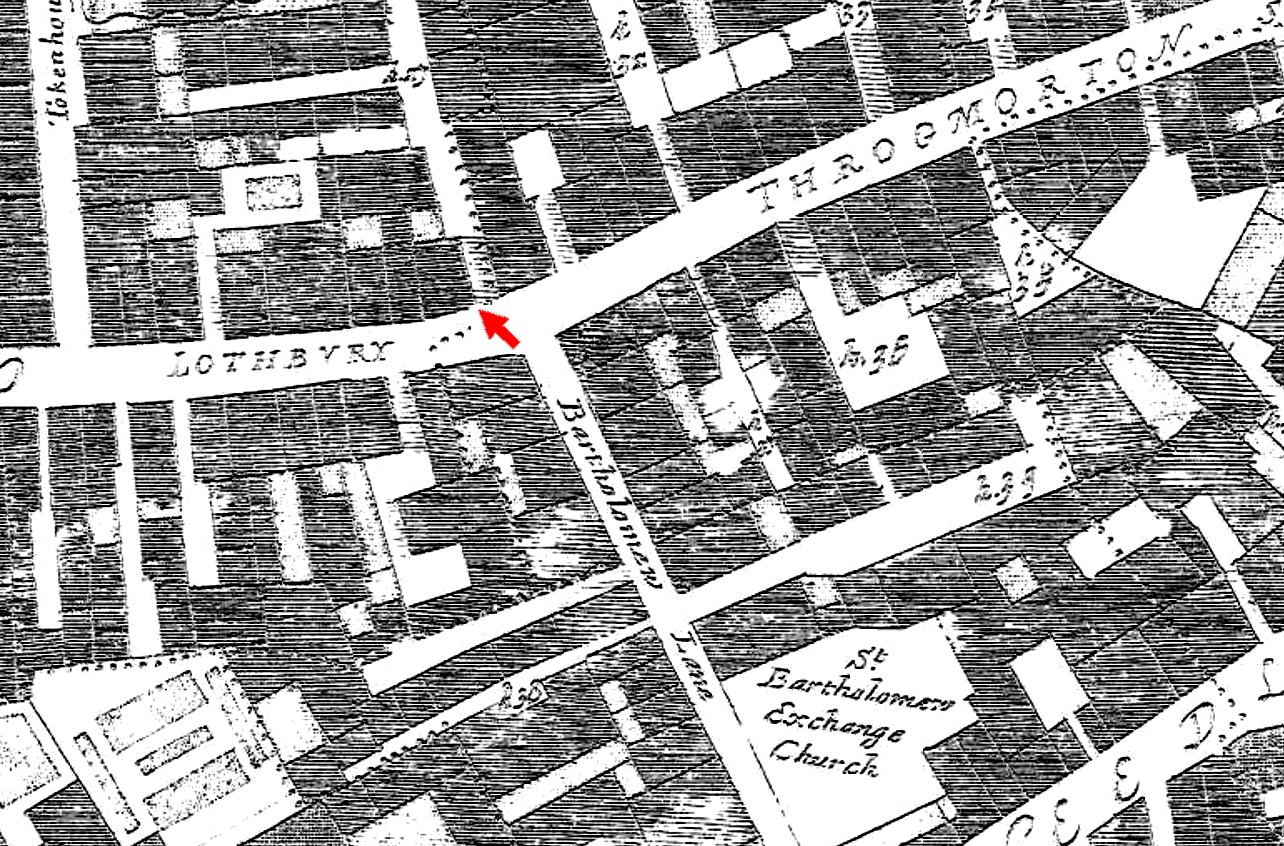
Location of The Whalebone (arrowed) on Ogilby and Morgan's Large Scale Map of the City As Rebuilt By 1676.

The Whalebone was an eatery on Lothbury in the City of London that was a meeting place for the Leveller movement in the mid 17th century. The Levellers described themselves as "whaleboners" in an early printed declaration, and their leader John Lilburne would read various declarations and lead meetings there. Henry Ireton, Oliver Cromwell's son-in-law, sent spies to the Whalebone to observe the Levellers. It was referred to as one of the Levellers' 'Houses of Parliament', along with the Mouth Inn in Aldersgate. The Windmill Tavern was similarly associated with the Levellers.
