= Lothbury =

Street in the City of London

Coordinates: 51°30′53″N 0°5′22″W

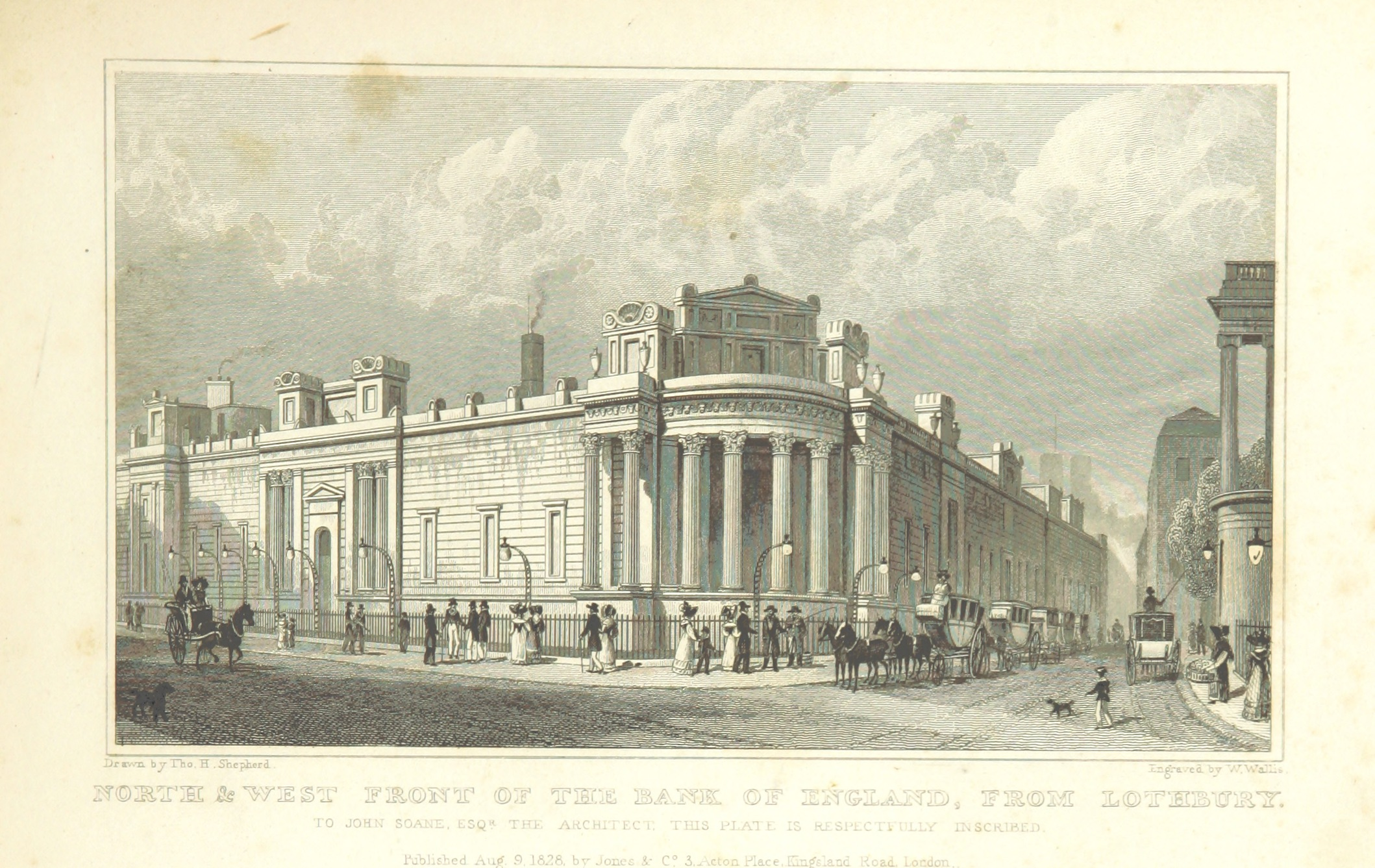
"North and West Front of the Bank of England, from Lothbury", 1828.

Lothbury is a short street in the City of London. It runs east–west with traffic flow in both directions, between Gresham Street's junction with Old Jewry and Coleman Street to the west, and Bartholomew Lane's junction with Throgmorton Street to the east.

== History ==
The area was populated with coppersmiths in the Middle Ages before later becoming home to a number of clockmakers, merchants and bankers. According to Stow, the street was:

possessed for the most part by founders that cast candlesticks, chafing dishes, spice mortars, and such-like copper or laton works, and do afterwards turn them with the foot and not with the wheel, to make them smooth and bright with turning and scratching (as some do term it), making a loathsome noise to the by-passers that have not been used to the like, and therefore by them disdainfully called Lothberie.

— Old and New London: Volume 1 (London, 1878)

Lothbury was the location of the Whalebone, a meeting place for the radical Leveller movement in the mid seventeenth-century.

At the beginning of the twentieth century, the Great Northern & City Railway planned an underground railway station at Lothbury, but this was abandoned because of financial constraints. Today the nearest London Underground station is Bank, a short way to the south. The nearest mainline railway station is Liverpool Street, with National Rail services towards East Anglia.

== Buildings ==
The Bank of England moved to its present site on Threadneedle Street in 1734. Lothbury borders the Bank on the building's northern side, and some of Sir John Soane's work dating from 1788 can still be seen there today.

Opposite the Bank is the Christopher Wren church St Margaret Lothbury.

41 Lothbury is a particularly noteworthy office building, designed by architects Mewes and Davis, with interior columns, marble walls and floor. It was for many years the head office of National Westminster Bank. The Grade II* listed building was completed in 1932 and replaced a nineteenth-century building designed by Charles Robert Cockerell.

== People associated with Lothbury ==
Having retired as Governor of the Bank of England, Mervyn King was made a life peer and now has the title Baron King of Lothbury.

Charles Hoole had his school in Lothbury.
