= Citypoint =

Office building in the City of London

Coordinates: 51°31′10″N 0°5′22″W

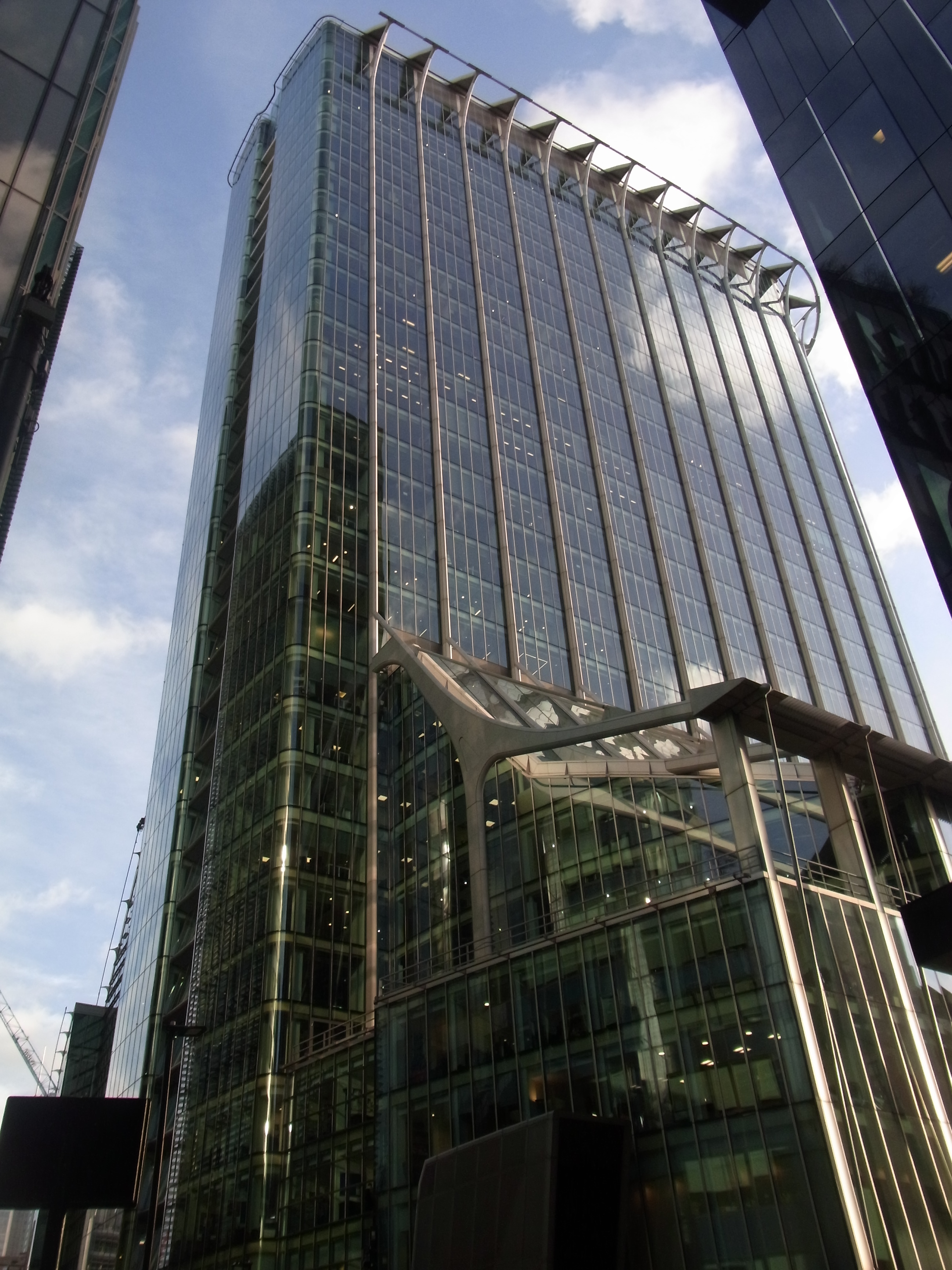
- CityPoint, January 2020

General information
- Status: Completed
- Type: Commercial
- Location: London, EC2; United Kingdom
- Completed: 1967; 59 years ago

Height
- Roof: 127 m (417 ft)

Technical details
- Floor count: 35

Citypoint (previously known as Britannic House and Britannic Tower) is a building located on Ropemaker Street on the northern fringe of the City of London, the main financial district and historic nucleus of London. It is the 13th-tallest building in the City and the 63rd-tallest in Greater London.

Originally named Britannic House, Citypoint was built in 1967 as a 35-storey, 122-metre (400 ft) tall headquarters for British Petroleum (now BP), becoming the first building in the City of London area to exceed the height of St Paul's Cathedral. The designers were F. Milton Cashmore and H. N. W. Grosvenor. In 1991 British Petroleum moved back to their original headquarters on Finsbury Circus and the building was renamed Britannic Tower.

It was refurbished in 2000, with additional floor space and the height increased to 127 metres (417 ft). The designer for the refurbishment was Sheppard Robson. It was renamed Citypoint after its refurbishment.

In August 2005 its owner, Pillar Properties, sold the building for more than £500 million in one of the largest deals ever seen in the City office market. In early 2007 the building was again put on the market, this time for £650 million, and purchased by Beacon Capital Partners, a private American company. At the time it was the most expensive building sale in the United Kingdom. A few months later, the sale of 8 Canada Square at Canary Wharf eclipsed this when it was sold for over £1 billion.

A number of other large buildings have been constructed nearby, including The Heron, a 36-storey 112-metre (367 ft) residential tower at Milton Court and a 95-metre (312 ft) office tower Ropemaker Place developed by British Land.

== Britannic House ==
Britannic House is the name of three buildings in the City of London that have served as the UK headquarters of BP and its predecessor companies.

Britannic House, 23 Great Winchester Street, EC2N 2DB, A 4-floor building. Headquarters of the Anglo-Persian Oil Company (founded in 1909) from November 1917 until c. 1925. Nos. 23, 24, 25 Great Winchester Street are group listed Grade II (list entry number 1358913, 16 January 1981).

Britannic House, 1-6 Finsbury Circus, EC2M 7EB. Also known as Lutyens House. Designed by Edwin Lutyens, Grade II* listed (entry number 1064691, 4 January 1950), and located in the northwest quadrant of Finsbury Circus. British headquarters of the Anglo-Persian Oil Company from c. 1925. Company was renamed the Anglo-Iranian Oil Company in 1935, and British Petroleum in 1954. British Petroleum relocated to Ropemaker Street in 1967, and then back to Finsbury Circus in 1991, and subsequently to 1 St. James’s Square, SW1Y 4PD.

Britannic House, 1 Ropemaker Street, EC2Y 9HR. The subject of this article. Designed by F. Milton Cashmore and H. N. W. Grosvenor, a 35-storey 122-metre (400-ft) tall building, constructed 1967. Occupied by BP from 1967 to 1991. Renamed Britannic Tower in 1991, and Citypoint after refurbishment in 2000.

== Image gallery ==
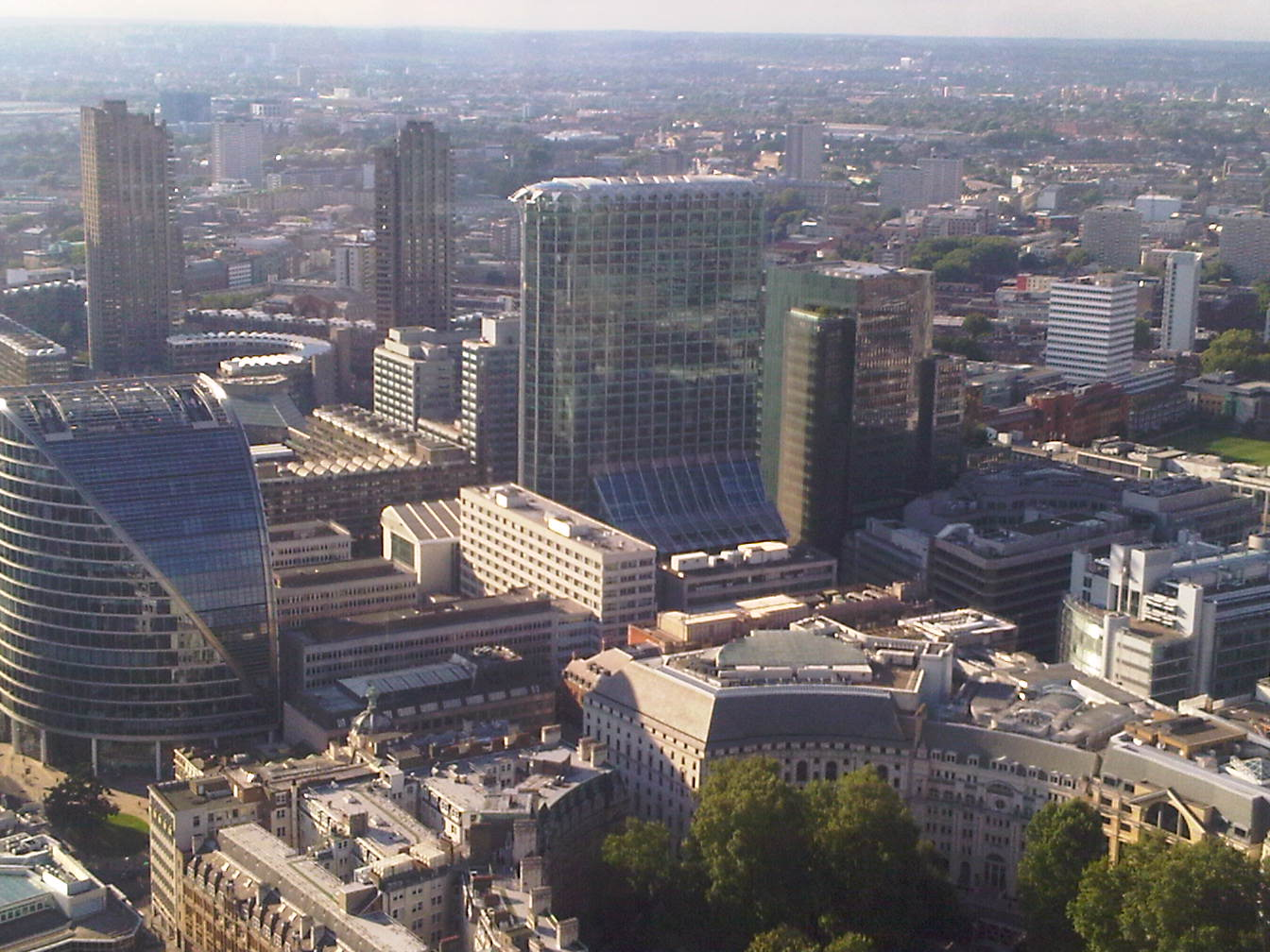
Aerial view

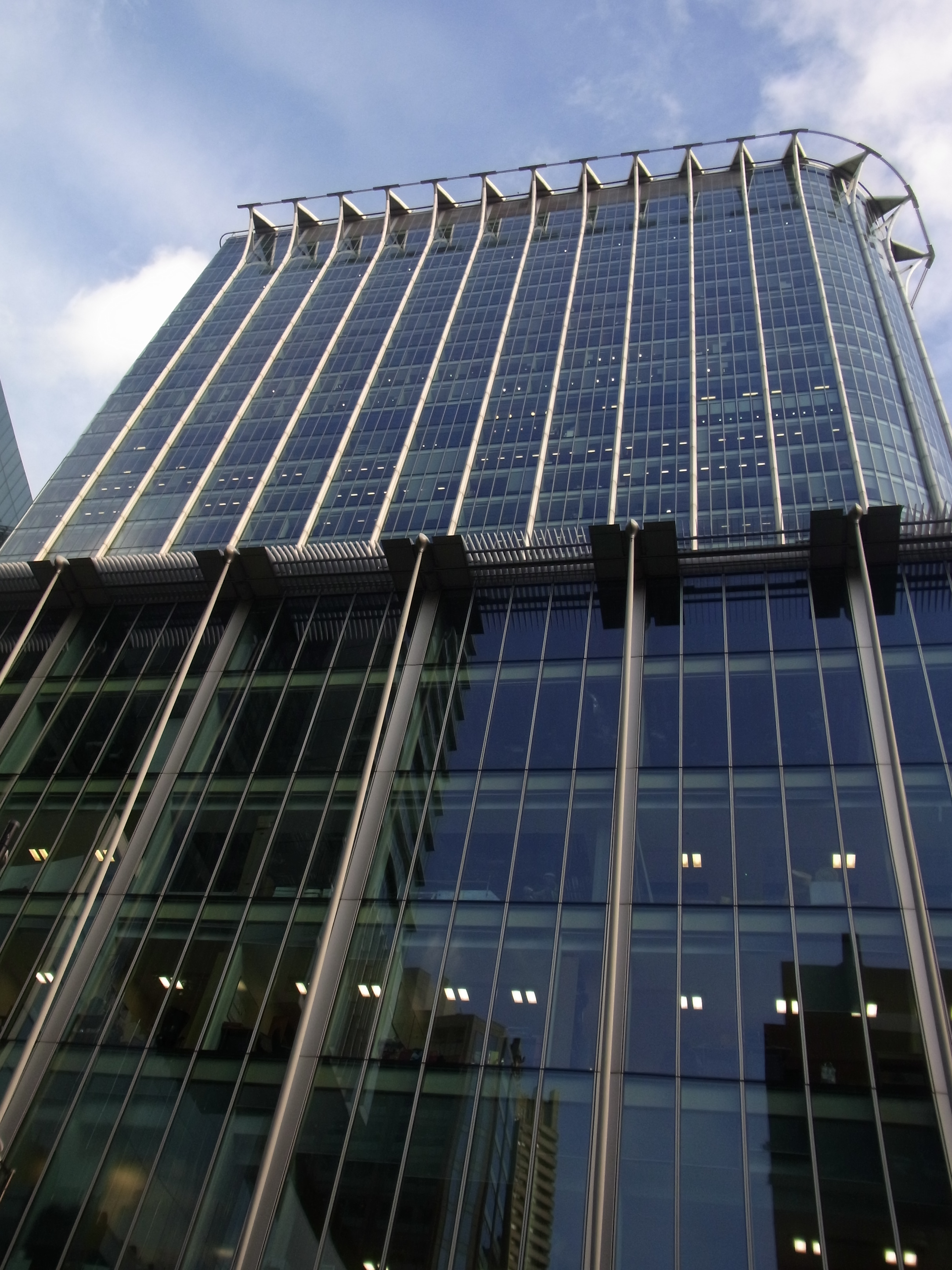
From below at street level

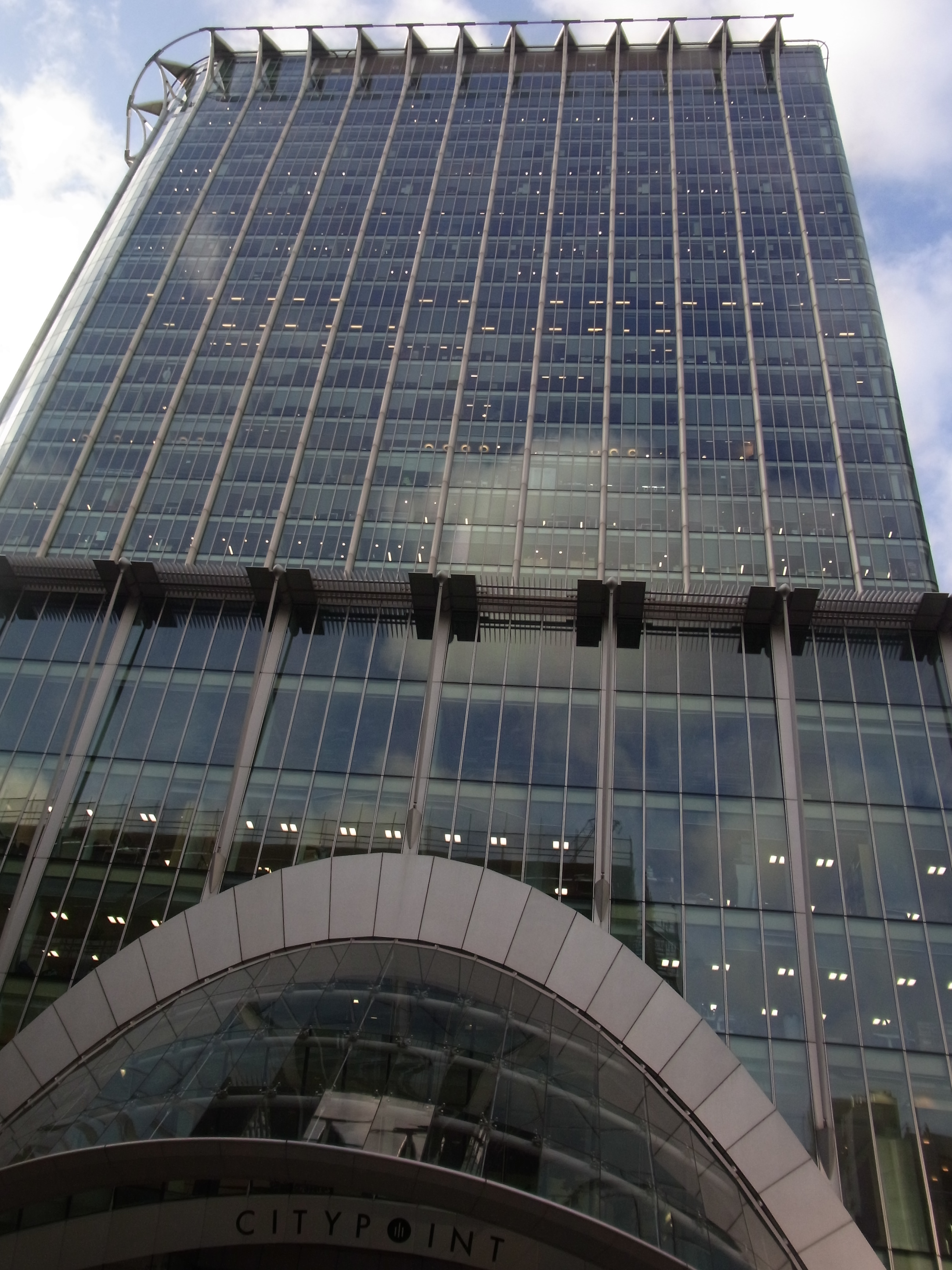
From outside main entrance

== See also ==
- Moor House
- Moorgate
- List of tallest buildings and structures in London

Records
Preceded by St Paul's Cathedral	Tallest Building in the City of London; 1967—1980; 122m	Succeeded by NatWest Tower
