= Ropemaker Place =

Office tower in London

General information
- Type: Office
- Location: London, England
- Coordinates: 51.520281°N 0.089132°W

Height
- Roof: 95 m (312 ft)

Technical details
- Floor count: 21

Design and construction
- Architecture firm: Arup Associaties
- Main contractor: Mace

Ropemaker Place is a highrise office tower on Ropemaker Street. Just outside the northern boundary of the City of London, it stands in the Borough of Islington. It was completed in 2009 and rises to 95 m (312 ft) over 21 storeys.

== History and description ==
The site was acquired by British Land in 2006, and the development, designed by Arup Associates with construction by Mace, was carried out speculatively, completing by 2009. At 95 m (312 ft) and 21 storeys in height, it consists of "six large-scale interlocking cubic forms, rising up as a series of garden terraces".

In 2018, the building was acquired by Ho Bee Land at a cost of £650 million from AXA Investment Managers. In 2026, Macquarie Grouph, who had moved into the building in 2010, reviewed options to move to a new headquarters elsewhere in London, but eventually decided to remain. Later that year, plans were announced for renovation of the building from the following year to be carried out by MoreySmith.

== See also ==
- 20 Ropemaker Street
- Citypoint
