= Northern City Line =

Partly underground railway line in London

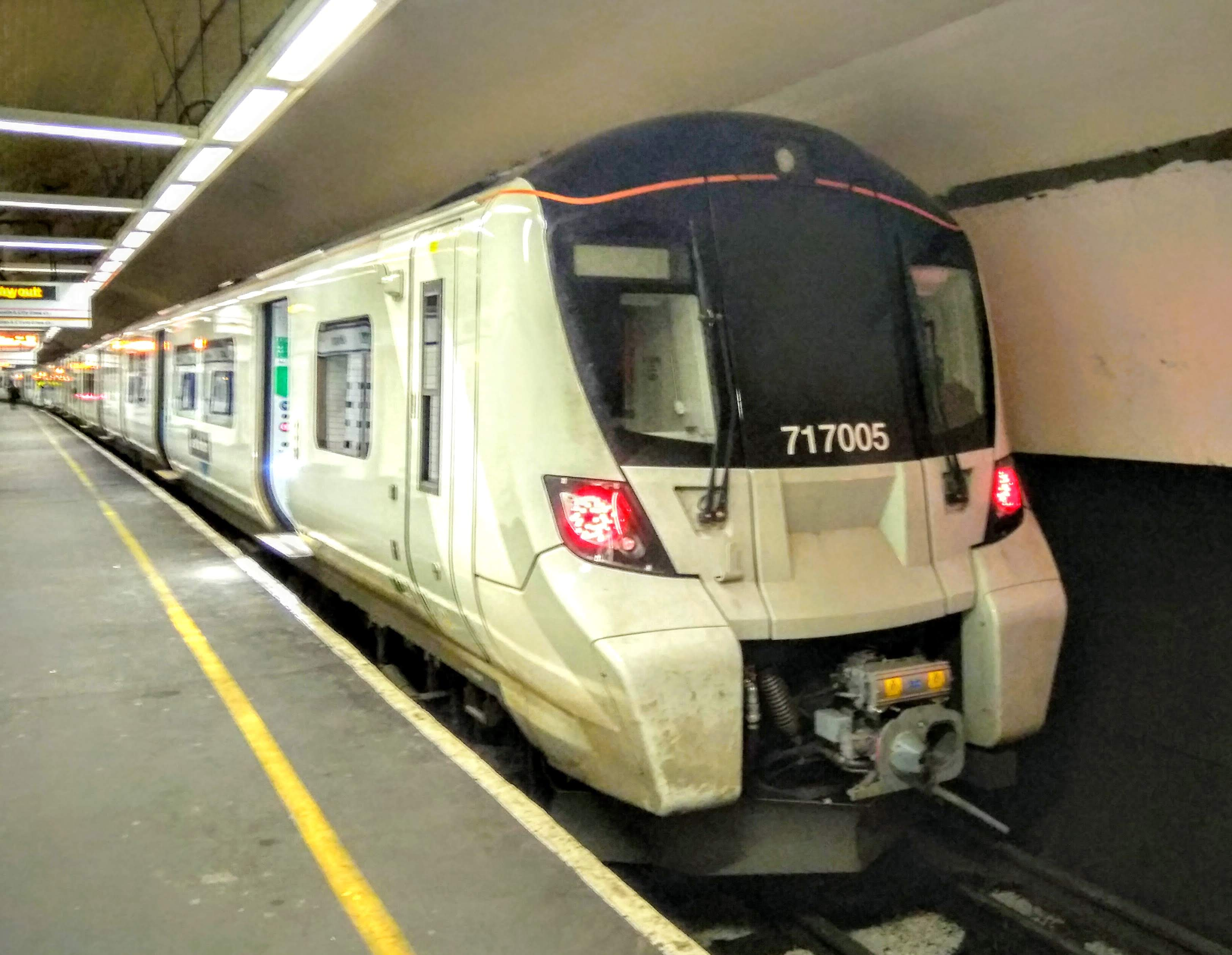
- A Class 717 at Moorgate

Overview
- Other name: Moorgate Line
- Status: Operational
- Owner: Network Rail
- Locale: Greater London
- Termini: Finsbury Park; London Moorgate
- Stations: 6

Service
- Type: Commuter rail, Suburban rail
- System: National Rail
- Operator: Great Northern (Greater Thameslink Railway)
- Depot: Hornsey
- Rolling stock: Class 717 "Desiro City"

History
- Opened: 1904

Technical
- Num of tracks: Two
- Track gauge: 1,435 mm (4 ft 8 1/2 in) standard gauge
- Loading gauge: W6
- Electrification: 25 kV 50 Hz AC OHLE (north of Drayton Park); 750 V DC third rail (south of Drayton Park)
- Signalling: ETCS Level 2
Route map
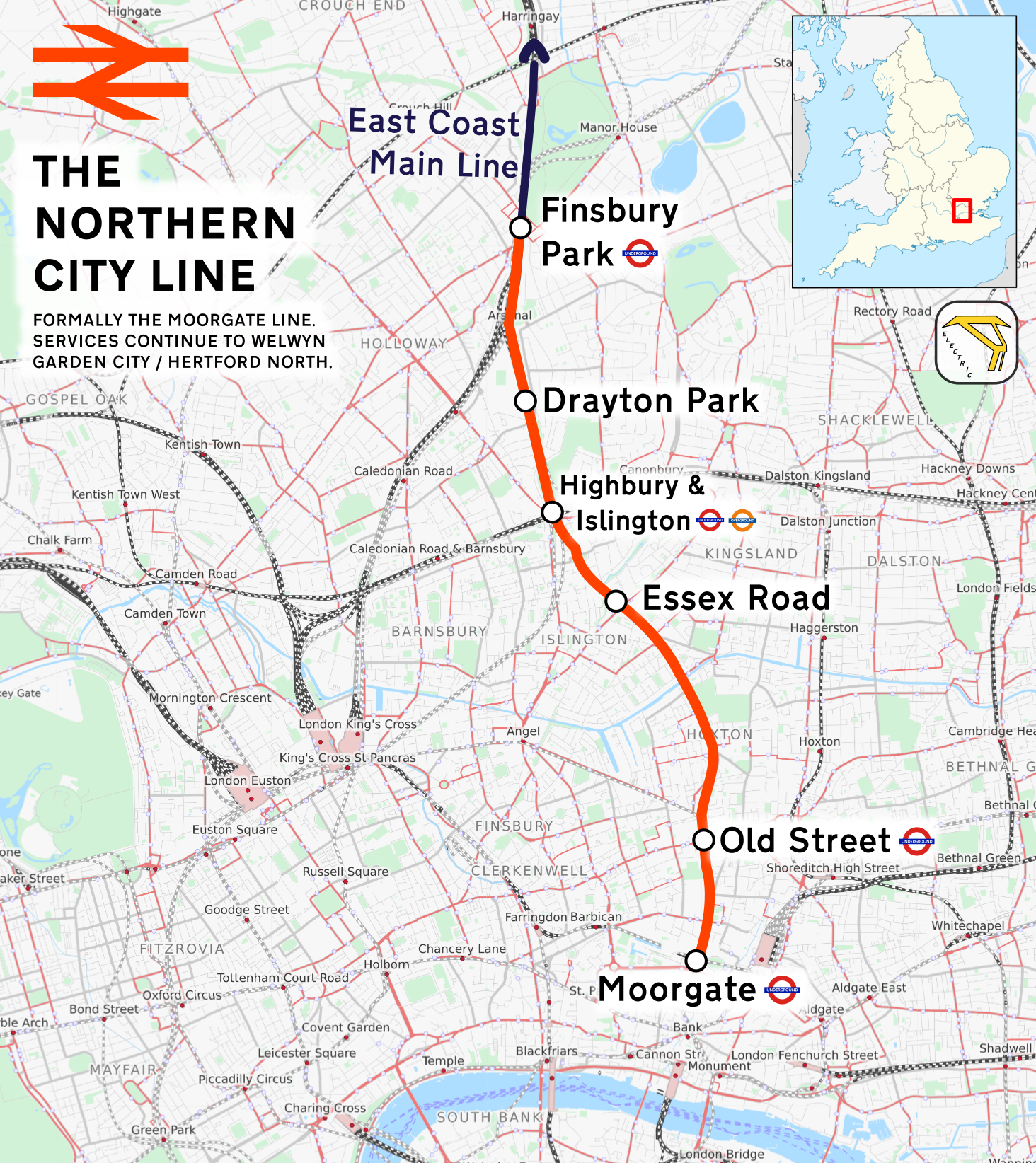

The Northern City Line (NCL) is a commuter railway line in England, which runs from Moorgate station to Finsbury Park in London with services running beyond. It is part of the Great Northern Route services, and operates as the south-eastern branch of the East Coast Main Line (ECML). It is underground from Moorgate to Drayton Park in Highbury, from which point it runs in a cutting until joining the ECML south of Finsbury Park. Its stations span northern inner districts of Greater London southwards to the City of London, the UK's main financial centre. Since December 2015, its service timetable has been extended to run into the late evenings and at weekends, meeting a new franchise commitment for a minimum of six trains per hour until 23:59 on weekdays and four trains per hour at weekends.

The official name for this line is the Moorgate Line, but it is rarely referred to as this due to confusion with the Widened Lines route from Kentish Town to Farringdon, which, until March 2009, also served Moorgate surface-level station on the London Midland Region. The Northern City Line's name is derived from the fact that it was originally a London Underground line, where it was described or managed as part of both the Metropolitan and Northern lines (sometimes as the "Highbury Branch"), although never connected to either. Built as an isolated route with a northern terminus at Finsbury Park, reconstruction connected it to the British Rail network in 1976 and began its modern service pattern. One of London's deep-level railways, the Northern City is unlike the others in being owned by Network Rail and served by commuter trains operated by Great Northern from Moorgate to Finsbury Park and onwards to Hertfordshire.

== History ==
Great Northern and City Railway Act 1892
- Act of Parliament
- Parliament of the United Kingdom
- Long title: An Act for incorporating the Great Northern and City Railway Company and empowering them to construct a railway from the Canonbury branch of the Great Northern Railway near Finsbury Park to the city of London and for other purposes.
- Citation: 55 & 56 Vict. c. ccxlii

Dates
- Royal assent: 28 June 1892

Great Northern and City Railway Act 1895
- Act of Parliament
- Parliament of the United Kingdom
- Long title: An Act to extend the powers for the purchase of Lands and the time for the completion of the Great Northern and City Railway.
- Citation: 58 & 59 Vict. c. cxii

Dates
- Royal assent: 6 July 1895

Text of statute as originally enacted

Great Northern and City Railway Act 1897
- Act of Parliament
- Parliament of the United Kingdom
- Long title: An Act to extend the powers for the purchase of land and the time for the completion of the Railway authorised by the Great Northern and City Railway Act 1892 and to amend some of the provisions of that Act.
- Citation: 60 & 61 Vict. c. cxciii

Dates
- Royal assent: 6 August 1897

Text of statute as originally enacted

Great Northern and City Railway Act 1902
- Act of Parliament
- Parliament of the United Kingdom
- Long title: An Act to confer further powers on the Great Northern and City Railway Company and to extend the time for the completion of the authorised railway of that Company and for other purposes.
- Citation: 2 Edw. 7. c. ccxxii

Dates
- Royal assent: 8 August 1902

Great Northern and City Railway Act 1903
- Act of Parliament
- Parliament of the United Kingdom
- Long title: An Act to amend the Great Northern and City Railway Act 1902 and to authorise the Great Northern and City Railway Company to raise additional capital for the purposes of their undertaking.
- Citation: 3 Edw. 7. c. v

Dates
- Royal assent: 30 June 1903

Text of statute as originally enacted

Great Northern and City Railway Act 1904
- Act of Parliament
- Parliament of the United Kingdom
- Long title: An Act to extend the time for the completion of railways and for other purposes.
- Citation: 4 Edw. 7. c. viii

Dates
- Royal assent: 24 June 1904

Text of statute as originally enacted

Great Northern and City Railway Act 1907
- Act of Parliament
- Parliament of the United Kingdom
- Long title: An Act to revive and extend the powers for the purchase of lands and to extend the time limited for the completion of the railway and works authorised by the Great Northern and City Railway Act 1902 and for other purposes.
- Citation: 7 Edw. 7. c. lxxvi

Dates
- Royal assent: 28 July 1907

Text of statute as originally enacted

Metropolitan Railway Act 1913
- Act of Parliament
- Parliament of the United Kingdom
- Long title: An Act to transfer to and vest in the Metropolitan Railway Company the undertaking of the Great Northern and City Railway Company to empower the Metropolitan Railway Company to construct a new railway and works to acquire additional land to raise additional capital and for other purposes.
- Citation: 3 & 4 Geo. 5. c. liv

Dates
- Royal assent: 15 August 1913

Text of statute as originally enacted

The Great Northern and City Railway (GN&CR) was planned to allow electrified trains to run from the Great Northern Railway (GNR, now the East Coast Main Line) at Finsbury Park to the City of London at Moorgate. Despite being built using similar methods to the tube network then under construction, the tunnels were built large enough to take a main-line train, with an internal diameter of 16 feet (4.9 m), compared with those of the Central London Railway with a diameter less than 12 feet (3.7 m). For this reason the line was popularly known as the "Big Tube" in its early days. However, the GNR eventually opposed the scheme and cancelled its electrification plans, and the line opened in 1904 with the northern terminus in tunnels underneath Finsbury Park GNR station. It was originally electrified using an unusual fourth-rail system with a conductor rail outside each running rail. Power was provided from a dedicated power station located at Poole Street containing four 1250 HP Musgrave cross compound steam engines driving dynamos.

The Metropolitan Railway Act 1913 (3 & 4 Geo. 5. c. liv) allowed the Metropolitan Railway (MR), which operated what are today the Metropolitan and Hammersmith & City lines and the former East London line, to buy the GN&CR. The MR had plans to link it to the Circle and Waterloo & City lines, but these were never fulfilled. During this period, the line remained an isolated branch, without through services to any other part of the rail network. Carriages were brought to it through a connection into a freight yard near Drayton Park station, where a small depot was built to service trains.

The GN&CR generating station closed when the MR took over, and became the studio of Gainsborough Pictures. After lying derelict for many years, it became a temporary venue for the Almeida Theatre. The site has since been redeveloped as apartments.

After the formation of the London Passenger Transport Board in 1933, the MR was amalgamated with the other Underground railways and the line was renamed the Northern City Line. In 1934 it was re-branded as part of the Edgware–Morden line (which was renamed the Northern line in 1937), and in 1939 operations were transferred from the Metropolitan to the Northern. As part of London Transport's New Works Programme, the Northern Heights plan was to connect the Northern City Line at Finsbury Park to existing main-line suburban branches running to Alexandra Palace, High Barnet and Edgware, which would be taken over by London Transport and electrified. The Highgate branch of the Edgware–Morden line would connect to this network north of Highgate. Only parts of this plan were completed: when the Second World War started, the Highgate link and electrification of the Barnet branch were well under way and ultimately completed, but the Northern City connection to Highgate was first postponed and finally cancelled after the war.

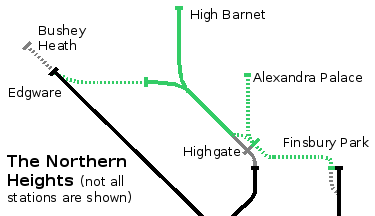
The planned 1930s Northern Heights extensions, showing the diversion of the Northern City Line to Alexandra Palace, Bushey Heath and High Barnet. Sections marked in solid green were ultimately taken over. The line from Highgate to Finsbury Park already existed but was to be absorbed by London Transport; this never happened and it closed to passengers in 1954. After being used to transfer tube trains from Highgate depot to the Northern City line, it closed permanently in 1970.

After the war there were proposals to extend the Northern City Line north and south. The London Plan Working Party Report of 1949 proposed several new lines and suburban electrification schemes for London, lettered from A to M. The lower-priority routes J and K would have seen the Northern City Line extended to Woolwich (Route J) and Crystal Palace (Route K), retaining the "Northern Heights" extensions to Edgware and Alexandra Palace. The lines would have run in small-diameter tube tunnels south from Moorgate to Bank and London Bridge. The "K" branch would have run under Peckham to Peckham Rye, joining the old Crystal Palace (High Level) branch (which was still open in 1949) near Lordship Lane. Nothing came of these proposals, and the Edgware, Alexandra Palace and Crystal Palace (High Level) branches were all closed to passengers in 1954. As a result, the Northern City Line remained isolated from the rest of the network.

In 1964, the Northern City Line (low level) platforms at Finsbury Park were given over to become the southbound platforms of both the Piccadilly line and the new Victoria Line, the former Piccadilly line platforms becoming the northbound Piccadilly and Victoria lines' platforms. From this time the NCL used Drayton Park as its terminus. At the same time a change was made at Highbury & Islington, with the northbound Northern City line diverted to a new platform alongside the northbound Victoria line, and the southbound Victoria using the former northbound Northern City platform, both providing cross-platform interchange. Passengers from Moorgate to Finsbury Park took the Northern City line to Highbury & Islington and then changed onto the Victoria Line.

In 1970 the line was connected (as intended by its original promoters) to the mainline via the high level platforms at Finsbury Park as part of a wider plan to electrify ECML suburban services. The line was renamed Northern line (Highbury Branch) and the following year an agreement was made to transfer it to British Rail. Commuter trains were run to/from Moorgate instead of King's Cross, relieving congestion at King's Cross.

The last London Underground services ran in October 1975 and British Rail services commenced in August 1976, replacing services to Broad Street via the city branch of the North London Line. These British Rail services used the name "Great Northern Electrics". The track and tunnels are now owned by Network Rail. Services are provided by Great Northern to Welwyn Garden City and, via the Hertford Loop Line, to Hertford North (with some extending to Stevenage, Hitchin or Letchworth). The name "Northern City Line" has been revived to refer to the underground part of the route.

== Infrastructure ==
From Finsbury Park to Drayton Park traction current is supplied at 25 kV AC via overhead line, controlled by York Electrical Control Room.

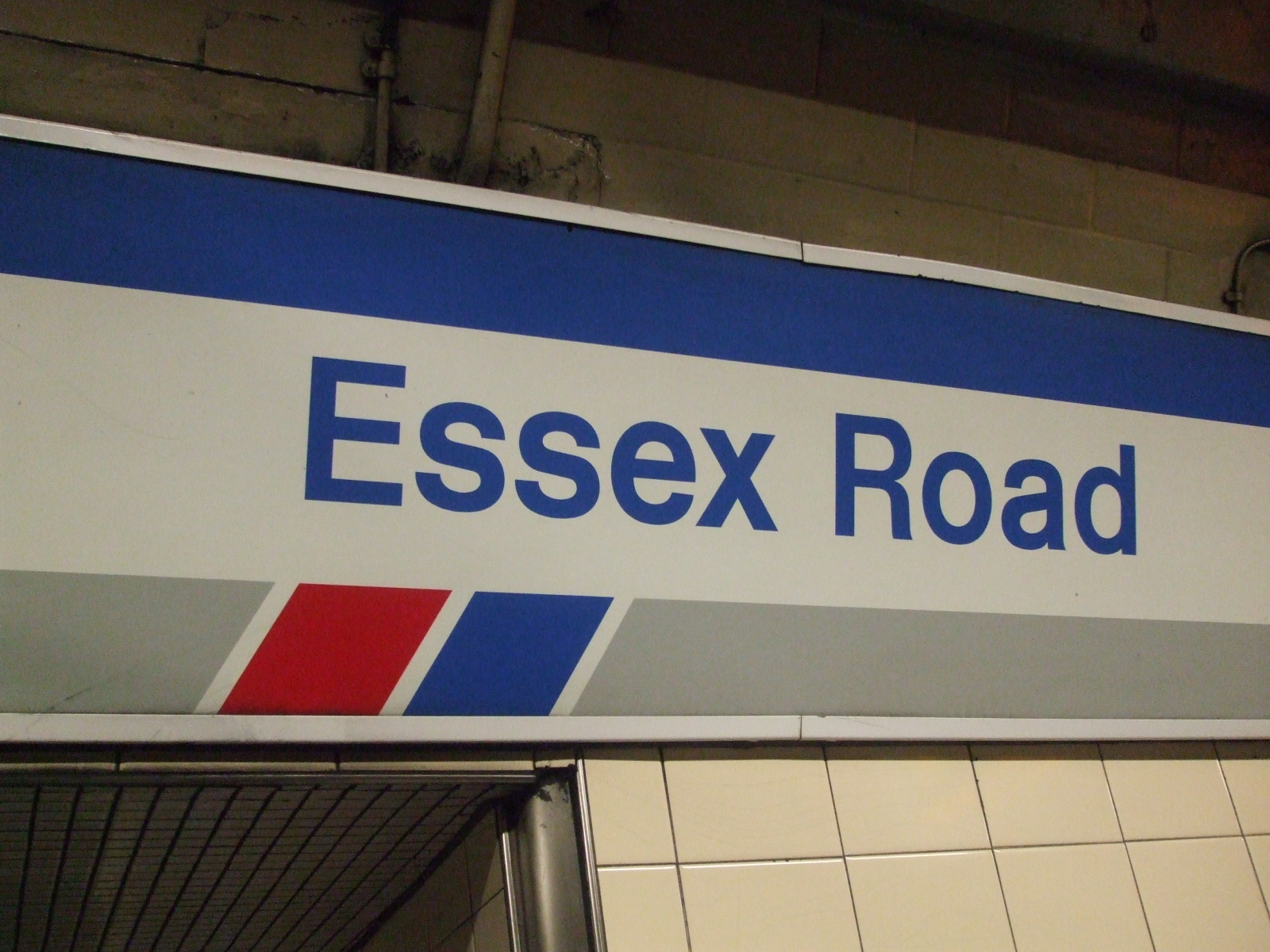
Network SouthEast branding at Essex Road station.

From Drayton Park to Moorgate traction current is supplied at 750 V DC via third rail. There are two electrical sections, separated by a gap at Poole Street:

- Queensland Road to Poole Street
- Poole Street to Finsbury Circus

Trains change from AC to DC traction supply, or vice versa, whilst standing at Drayton Park station. The platform starting signal on the Up platform at Drayton Park is held at danger (red) as the train approaches. This ensures that all trains stop to lower the pantograph before going into the tunnel.

In the 1970s the original London Underground fourth-rail traction current supply was converted to a third-rail 750V DC system. The redundant centre fourth-rail was disconnected and left in situ since it was difficult to remove in the narrow tunnels.

Signalling is controlled from Kings Cross panel at York ROC. Between Drayton Park and Moorgate, there is no Automatic Warning System or Train Protection & Warning System equipment provided, due to the position of the auxiliary return rail. All signals are multiple aspect colour light signals fitted with train stop arms.

=== East Coast Digital Programme ===
Works to commission new ETCS digital signalling on the line, along with the first test train under the new system, took place during the Early May Bank Holiday in 2022. The new signalling system was approved by the Office of Rail and Road in March 2023, and gradually introduced on passenger services from 27 November 2023. By November 2024, all passenger services were operated under ETCS signalling, with traditional lineside signals completely removed on 18 May 2025.

== Operational procedures ==
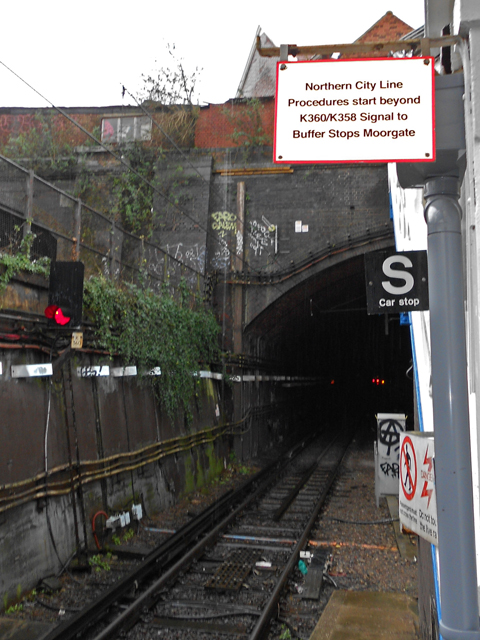
NCL Start of Procedures sign & Up platform starting signal at Drayton Park

Because mainline trains operate over the infrastructure inherited from London Underground, there are some practices on the NCL which differ from Railway Rulebook instructions, and these are contained in an additional publication. These include:

=== Passing signals at danger ===
If a train is standing at a signal at danger inside a tunnel and it is not possible for the driver to contact the signaller, the driver is permitted to pass that signal under their own authority. As soon as the train starts to move, the tripcock on the train will automatically operate and bring the train to a stop, so the driver must reset it before continuing. They must then proceed with caution, be prepared to stop short of any obstruction, and not travel any faster than 3 mph (4.8 km/h). When they reach the next signal they must stop and attempt to contact the signaller, to inform the signaller of what has taken place regardless of the aspect that it is showing.

Platform starting signals, which let the train into a tunnel, can only be passed at danger with the signaller's authority.

=== Assisting a failed train ===
Unlike surface lines, the driver of a train which fails on the NCL is not required to leave the train to lay detonators and then wait for the assisting train. The driver remains with the train and the signaller will authorise the driver of the assisting train to proceed to the rear of the failed train at a maximum speed of 3 mph (4.8 km/h). To ensure that the rear of the failed train is always visible, all trains working over the NCL are required to display three red lights at their rear: two tail lamps plus the red portion of the destination roller blind.

On reaching the failed train, the assisting driver will stop short then clip their tunnel telephone onto the tunnel wires so that they can discuss with the driver of the failed train how to carry out the assistance in order to get the trains moving again. Then the two trains are coupled together and the drivers can talk to each other over the usual cab-to-cab handsets before proceeding.

== Rolling stock ==
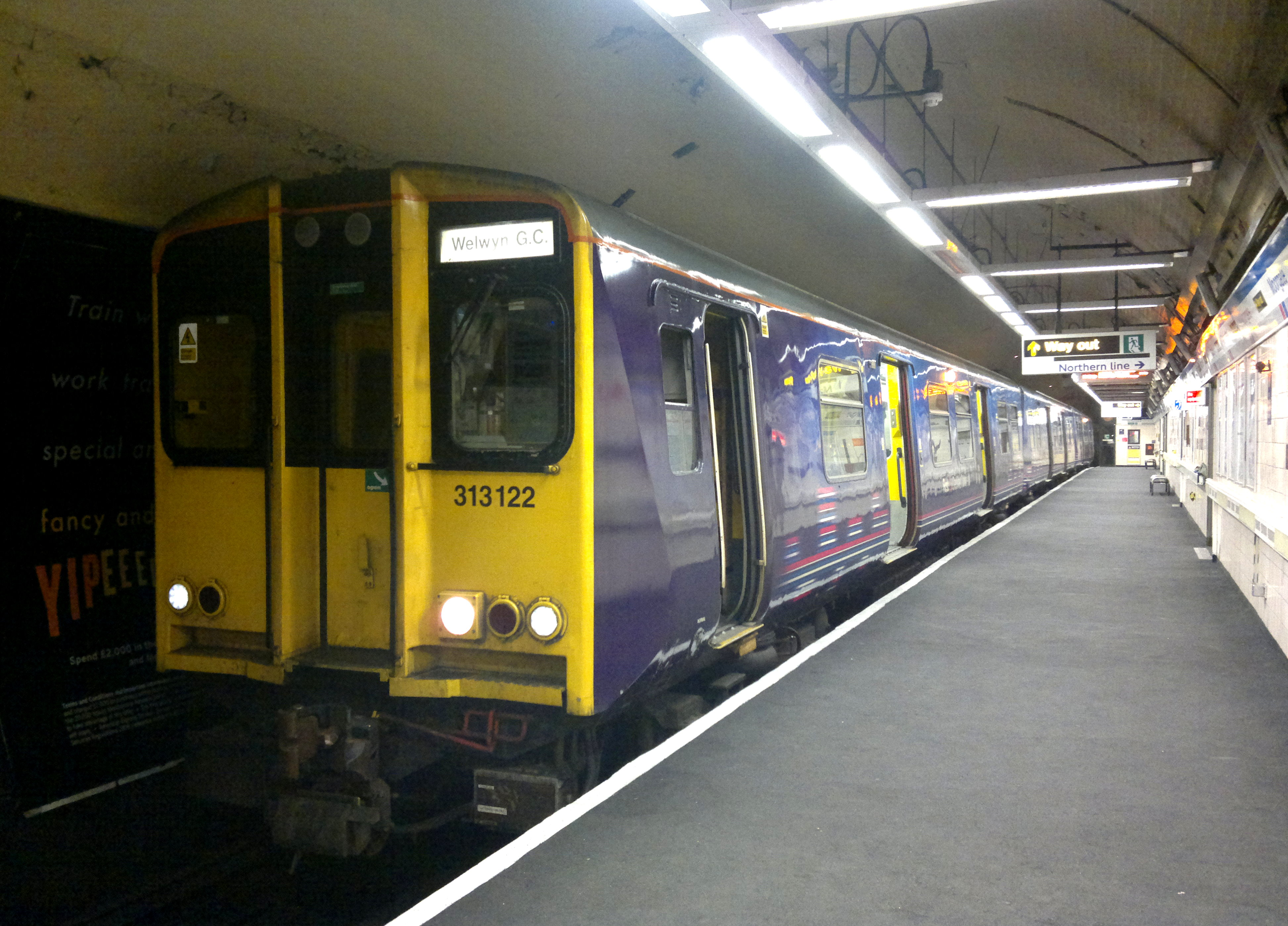
Class 313 unit at Moorgate

As part of its contract to supply electrical equipment during the construction of the line, in 1901 British Thomson-Houston provided 35 sets of traction control equipment to Brush Electrical Engineering Company and Dick, Kerr & Company. The original plan was for 11 seven-car trains (33 motors and 44 trailers) and one shunting locomotive. Initially 26 motorcars and 32 trailer cars were built. They were known as the 'wooden' cars because they were fabricated of teak and mahogany on steel underframes. In 1906 Brush delivered another five motors and 13 trailers. There were of all-steel construction and naturally-enough referred to as 'steel cars'. The GN&CR converted one trailer to a motor car, bringing the fleet to 32 motors and 44 trailers. (The remaining sets of traction control equipment were used as maintenance spares.) Normal operation was six-car formations at peak times, reduced to two-car sets at other times. Cars were 56 ft 6 in (17.22 m) long over buffers, 9 ft 4 in (2.84 m) wide, and 12 ft 2 in (3.71 m) in height. Seats were provided for 58 passengers in the wooden trailers and 64 in the steel ones. Motor cars seated 54 because of a 2 ft 10 in (86 cm) equipment compartment behind the driver's cab. Uniquely in England, coupling between cars was by means of link and pin on the centre-line.

The original fleet of 76 carriages was withdrawn and replaced by London Underground Standard Stock on 15 May 1939. These became the last pre-1938 trains running on the Underground, being phased out during the last weeks of October 1966 through 3 November. 1938 tube stock serviced the line, in variously three-, four- and six-car formations, until its temporary closure on 4 October 1975.

Services are currently operated by dual-voltage Class 717 electric multiple units (EMUs), which replaced Class 313 units as part of a franchise commitment when Govia Thameslink Railway took over management of the line and its services. The Class 717s began to enter service in March 2019. To comply with regulations for trains operating in single-bore tunnels where there is not enough clearance space for side evacuation, they have emergency doors at both ends of a unit. When operating on 750 V DC, the two motor coaches of a Class 313 collected traction current from their own shoe gear only; there was no traction bus linking them together as found on most electric multiple units. All of the Class 313 units when operating on the NCL had their Driving Motor B vehicle at the London end, and whilst on 750 V DC were electronically limited to 30 mph (48 km/h), which is the maximum line speed. All stations are long enough to accept six-car trains.

== Accidents and incidents ==
=== Moorgate tube crash ===
The Moorgate tube crash, which killed 43 people, is the most serious peacetime accident on the London Underground. It occurred at Moorgate station on 28 February 1975, when a Highbury Branch train ran through the terminus at speed and crashed into the dead end of the tunnel beyond. The crash was found to have been caused by the driver, who was killed, but the specific cause was never determined; a report found that there was insufficient evidence to say whether it was a deliberate act of the driver or due to a medical condition.

=== Tunnel penetration incident ===
On 8 March 2013, pile boring operations on a building site in East Road, Hackney, 13 m (43 ft) above the tunnel, penetrated and obstructed the line between Old Street and Essex Road stations. A serious accident was averted by the actions of an observant train driver, and the line was restricted for several days for repairs. A subsequent investigation by the Rail Accident Investigation Branch was highly critical of carelessness on the construction companies involved and the planning approval process.

== Passenger volume ==
This is the number of passengers using stations on the line from the year beginning April 2002 to the year beginning April 2019. These numbers include all passengers using the station, not just Northern City Line users.

Station usage
| Station name | 2002–03 | 2004–05 | 2005–06 | 2006–07 | 2007–08 | 2008–09 | 2009–10 | 2010–11 | 2011–12 | 2012–13 | 2013–14 | 2014–15 | 2015–16 | 2016–17 | 2017–18 | 2018–19 | 2019–20 | 2020–21 | 2021–22 | 2022–23 | 2023–24 | 2024–25 |
|---|---|---|---|---|---|---|---|---|---|---|---|---|---|---|---|---|---|---|---|---|---|---|
| Finsbury Park | 3,006,865 | 5,021,634 | 5,041,828 | 5,875,109 | 5,545,881 | 5,492,164 | 6,566,019 | 7,337,297 | 6,448,792 | 6,430,270 | 6,429,584 | 6,263,994 | 5,656,786 | 7,032,726 | 6,781,272 | 7,614,996 | 7,669,706 | 2,013,500 | 4,600,424 | 8,559,032 | | |
| Drayton Park | 164,459 | 129,849 | 118,426 | 288,324 | 279,243 | 261,164 | 338,246 | 478,144 | 505,230 | 552,840 | 572,418 | 625,436 | 690,750 | 791,700 | 859,130 | 860,124 | 784,628 | 174,134 | 358,386 | 516,734 | | |
| Highbury and Islington | No data | No data | No data | 4,809,098 | 4,751,391 | 4,173,338 | 5,668,133 | 7,625,235 | 11,800,800 | 14,695,098 | 15,840,018 | 19,975,522 | 28,166,440 | 29,852,702 | 29,507,772 | 30,439,574 | 29,398,624 | 8,660,736 | 17,186,284 | 20,601,096 | | |
| Essex Road | 356,425 | 118,145 | 115,680 | 274,645 | 384,504 | 336,338 | 401,718 | 474,340 | 482,764 | 521,464 | 572,332 | 627,430 | 715,984 | 810,518 | 861,234 | 856,598 | 768,438 | 197,416 | 407,786 | 556,966 | | |
| Old Street | No data | No data | No data | 733,612 | 813,166 | 827,762 | 1,326,797 | 1,434,785 | 1,336,722 | 1,396,260 | 1,455,920 | 1,682,134 | 3,611,484 | 5,323,546 | 5,756,246 | 7,119,730 | 6,768,052 | 2,230,872 | 3,672,524 | 5,437,172 | | |
| London Moorgate | 832 | 7,135,238 | 7,263,068 | 9,235,925 | 10,108,616 | 9,373,435 | 6,736,698 | 7,187,012 | 7,860,382 | 7,997,460 | 9,051,956 | 9,397,890 | 8,849,564 | 10,833,978 | 10,433,502 | 11,508,936 | 9,993,570 | 1,934,826 | 3,346,156 | 5,587,716 | | |
The annual passenger usage is based on sales of tickets in stated financial years from Office of Rail and Road estimates of station usage. The statistics are for passengers arriving and departing from each station and cover twelve-month periods that start in April. Methodology may vary year on year. Usage since the period 2019–20 have been affected by the COVID-19 pandemic, especially the period 2020–23.

== Future ==
=== TfL takeover ===
On 20 September 2025, Transport for London (TfL) submitted an outline business case to take over Great Northern services from Moorgate to Welwyn Garden City, Hertford North, and Stevenage and integrate it into the London Overground network. TfL wants to increase the number of trains from two trains per hour to four trains per hour, standardise fares across the route, serve a 21,000 home development at Crews Hill, and boost growth in North London and Hertfordshire. The takeover could occur in autumn 2027, after Govia Thameslink Railway's contract ends, if approval is given by DfT; however, the Overground services would use the existing Class 717 stock.

== See also ==
- Northern Heights plan
