= The Heron =

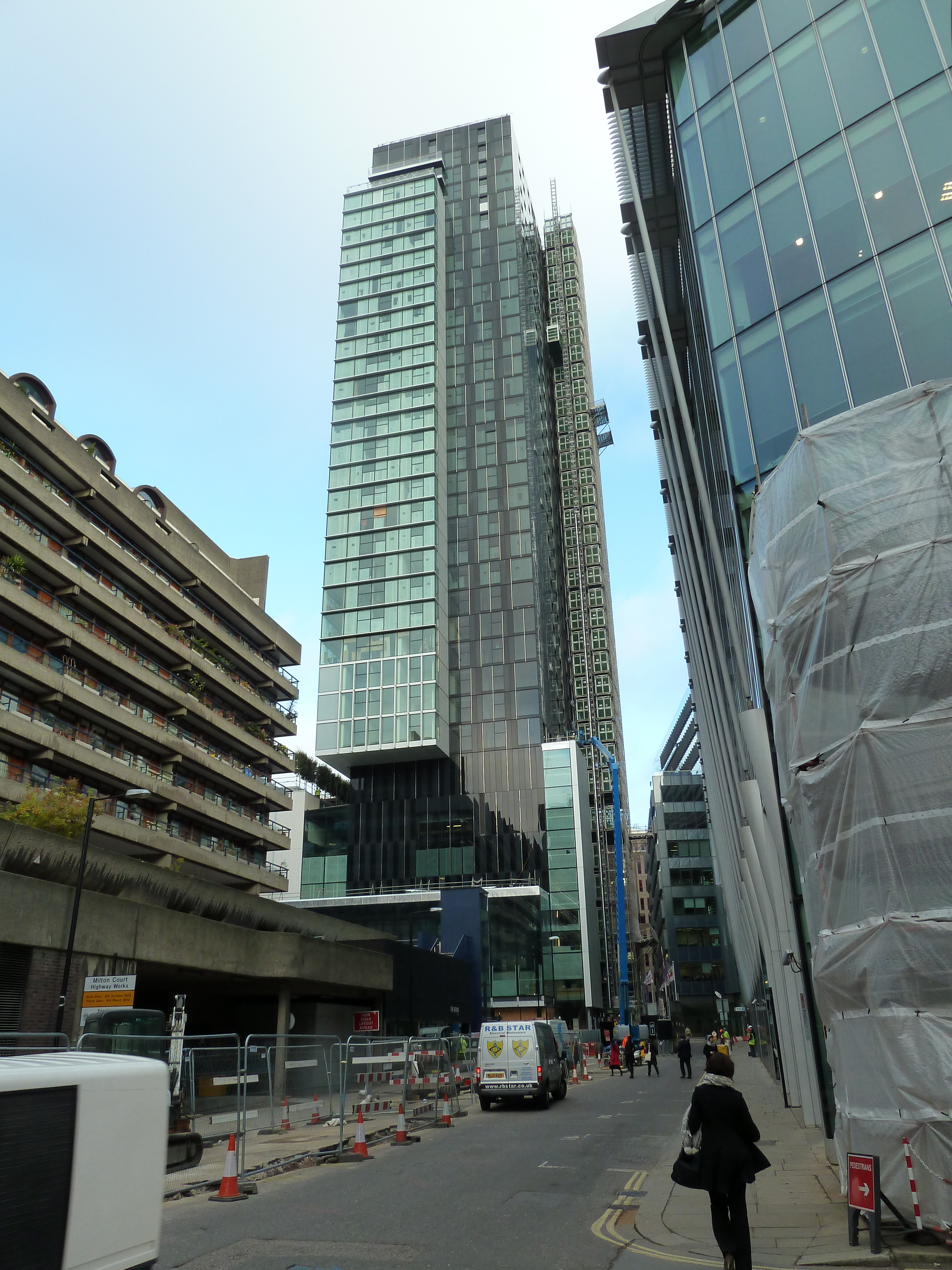
- The Heron
- Interactive map of the The Heron area

General information
- Status: Completed
- Type: Residential
- Location: London, EC2; United Kingdom
- Coordinates: 51.519889°N 0.090573°W
- Construction started: 2010
- Completed: 2013
- Opening: September 2013
- Cost: £89 million

Height
- Roof: 112 m (367 ft)
- Top floor: 105 m (343 ft)

Technical details
- Floor count: 35 (+1 basement floor)

Design and construction
- Architect: David Walker Architects
- Structural engineer: WSP Group
- Main contractor: Heron International, Guildhall School of Music and Drama, the City of London

Website
- https://heronleaseholders.com/

The Heron, also known as Milton Court, is a 36-storey residential tower in London, United Kingdom. The building was developed by Heron International.

Construction on the building began in 2010 and was completed in September 2013. It is located near the Barbican residential estate within the City of London area, close to Barbican and Moorgate tube stations.

Designed by David Walker Architects, the building was originally planned to be 140 m (460 ft) tall with 44 floors, but after criticism the height was scaled down to 112 m (367 ft) and 36 floors. Structural engineering on the project was completed by WSP Group.

The building's £89 million price tag was funded by Heron International and the City of London Corporation contributing a combined £75.5 million towards the development; the remaining £13.5 million was financed by the Guildhall School of Music and Drama.

The building is part of a wider redevelopment of Milton Court, to include a new teaching and performance centre for the Guildhall School. In the centre of the Heron there is an eight-storey high atrium. The building includes a 225-seat training theatre, a 625-seat concert hall and 284 apartments.

== See also ==
- Heron Tower
