= Moorgate station =

London Underground and railway station

Moorgate
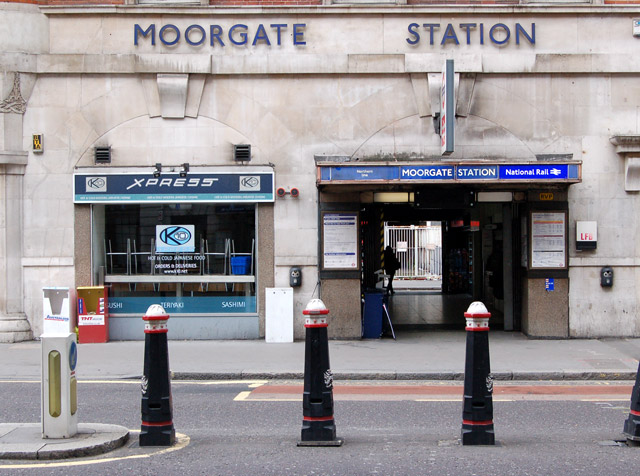
- Entrance to Moorgate prior to Crossrail works
- Interactive map of Moorgate

General information
- Location: Moorgate
- Local authority: City of London
- Managed by: London Underground
- Owners: Transport for London; Network Rail
- Station code: MOG
- DfT category: E
- Number of platforms: 10 (8 in use)
- Fare zone: 1
- OSI: Liverpool Street

London Underground annual entry and exit
- 2020: ▼5.84 million
- 2021: ▲8.79 million
- 2022: ▲20.01 million
- 2023: ▲23.33 million
- 2024: ▲26.93 million

National Rail annual entry and exit
- 2020–21: ▼1.935 million
- Interchange: ▼0.232 million
- 2021–22: ▲3.346 million
- Interchange: ▲0.430 million
- 2022–23: ▲5.588 million
- Interchange: ▲0.673 million
- 2023–24: ▲8.229 million
- Interchange: ▼0.537 million
- 2024–25: ▲8.791 million
- Interchange: ▼0.380 million

Key dates
- 23 December 1865: Opened (MR)
- 25 February 1900: Opened (C&SLR)
- 14 February 1904: Opened (GN&CR)
- 24 October 1924: Renamed Moorgate
- 28 February 1975: Moorgate tube crash
- 20 March 2009: Withdrawn (Thameslink)
- 24 May 2022: Opened access to Liverpool Street (EL)

Other information
- External links: TfL station info page; Departures; Facilities
- Coordinates: 51.5186°N 0.0886°W

Moorgate (/ˈmʊərɡeɪt/) is a central London railway terminus and connected London Underground station on Moorgate in the City of London. Main line railway services for Hertford North, Welwyn Garden City and Stevenage are operated by Great Northern, while the London Underground station is served by the Circle, Hammersmith & City, Metropolitan and Northern lines. It is in London fare zone 1.

The station was opened as Moorgate Street in 1865 by the Metropolitan Railway. In 1900, the City & South London Railway added the station to its network, and the Great Northern & City Railway began serving the station in 1904. In 1975, the Northern City Line platforms were the site of the Moorgate tube crash – at the time, the worst peacetime accident in the history of the London Underground – in which 43 people were killed. Thameslink branch services were withdrawn in the early 21st century, and a new ticket hall was built connected to the newly opened Elizabeth line at Liverpool Street in 2021, with through access to the rest of Liverpool Street Underground station.

== Location and station layout ==
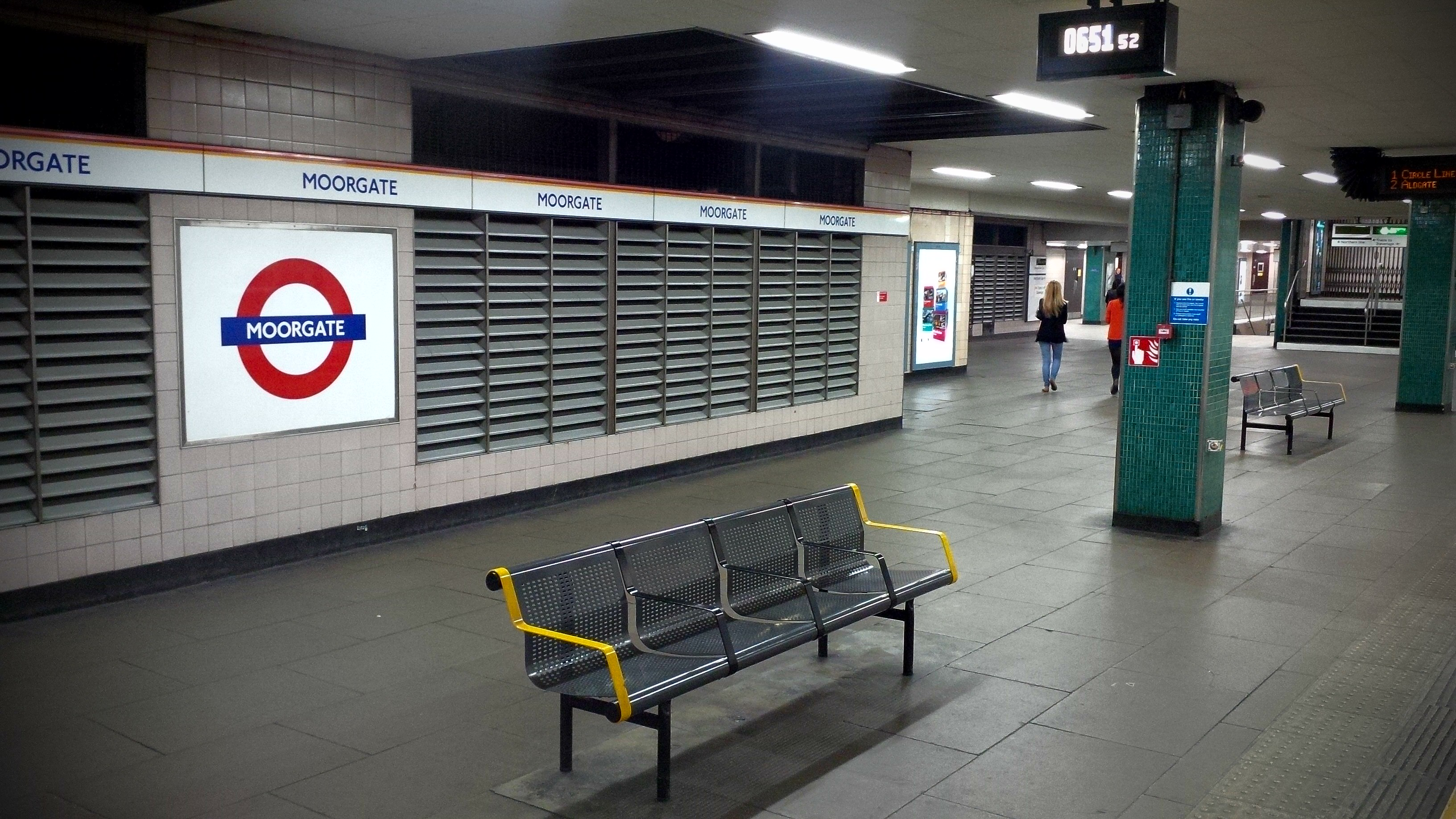
Sub-surface eastbound / clockwise, platform 1 at Moorgate station prior to Crossrail works

The station has entrances on both Moorgate itself and Moorfields, which runs parallel. The public entrances from the street give access to all the train services at the station, there are three distinct levels.

The Circle, Hammersmith & City and Metropolitan underground lines use platforms 1 and 2, which are through platforms. For terminating trains at busy times, there are platforms 3 and 4 which are west-facing bays. Adjacent to these are platforms 5 and 6 of the former Thameslink service from Bedford via St Pancras. These are no longer in use, following the closure of the Moorgate branch from Farringdon junction as part of the Thameslink Programme and are now used for storage.

The Northern line of the Underground uses platforms 7 and 8, which are in a deep-level tube section of the station. National Rail services on the Northern City Line use platforms 9 and 10, which are terminal platforms. Train services run via the East Coast Main Line to Welwyn Garden City, Hertford North and Stevenage. Because of this, Moorgate is part of the London station group and accepts tickets marked "London Terminals".

London Buses routes 21, 43, 76, 100, 141 and 153 serve the station. In addition, route 214 serves Finsbury Square, approx 200 m (220 yd) away.

== History ==
=== 1861–1950 ===
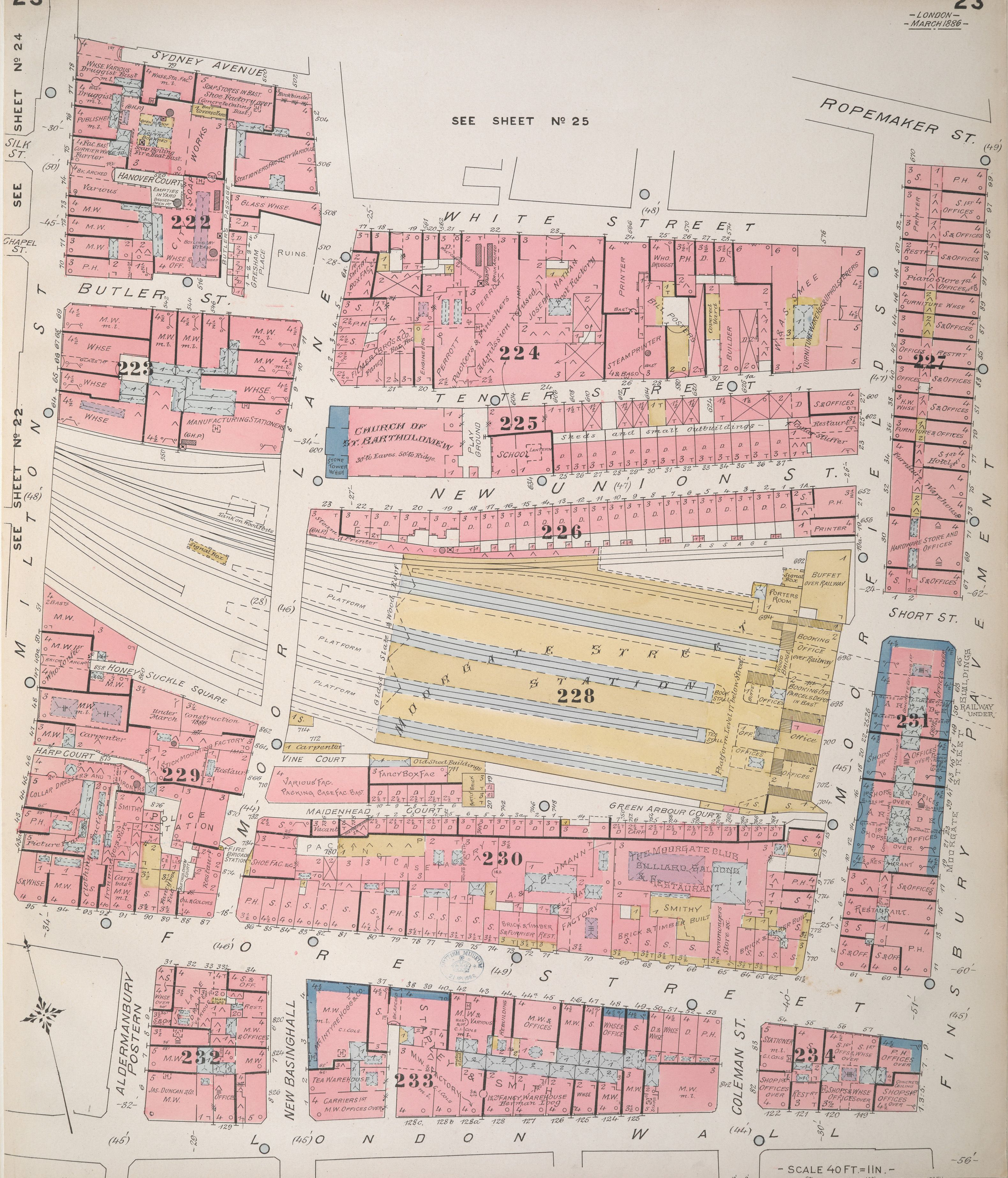
Plan of Moorgate Street station in 1886

The station was opened as Moorgate Street by the Metropolitan Railway as the first eastwards extension from the original terminus at Farringdon. Parliamentary power had been obtained to build a station at Moorgate in 1861, two years before the initial section, and it was completed on 23 December 1865. Increased traffic from other companies, including goods traffic from the Great Northern Railway, led to the line between King's Cross and Moorgate being widened to four tracks; the route was called the City Widened Lines and included a new tunnel at Clerkenwell which was 16 feet (4.9 m) lower than the original. The Widened Lines were open from Moorgate to Farringdon on 1 July 1866, and to King's Cross on 17 February 1868. Suburban services from the Midland Railway ran via Kentish Town and the Great Northern Railway ran via King's Cross. In 1874, director of the Metropolitan, Edward Watkin, described Moorgate Street as "your great terminus" and recommended a 100-bedroom hotel should be built on top of the station.

The now Northern line platforms were originally part of an extension of the City & South London Railway (C&SLR) beyond Borough towards Angel, forming the northern terminus of its services from Stockwell south of the River Thames. An act for the extension had been authorised in 1893 and included an eastern diversion of the original line underneath the Thames. The new station opened on 25 February 1900. The line was extended to Angel on 17 November the following year.

The Northern City Line to Moorgate was opened by the Great Northern & City Railway (GN&CR) on 14 February 1904 offering a service to Finsbury Park. It had an escalator connection to the other Moorgate platforms. The route was constructed in tube tunnels, but they were constructed at a diameter capable of accommodating main-line trains (in contrast to the majority of London tube tunnels which are much smaller). The line was the first to use automatic signalling throughout its length without any moving parts. Though a popular route, it went into decline after the Metropolitan Railway purchased the route on 1 July 1913. Consequently, the planned through services to the Great Northern Railway's main line were never implemented.

The CS&LR line (taken over by the Underground Group in 1913) closed services between Moorgate and Euston on 9 August 1922 in order to widen tunnels to 11 feet 8 1/4 inches (3.56 m). The section from Moorgate to Clapham Common was worked on during the night while daytime services remained running, but closed completely on 28 November 1923 following a roof collapse at Newington Causeway the day before. Services to Euston opened on 20 April 1924, along with a connection to Camden Town and stations further north. Services to Clapham Common resumed on 1 December. The station was renamed from Moorgate Street to Moorgate on 24 October that year.

=== 1950–present ===
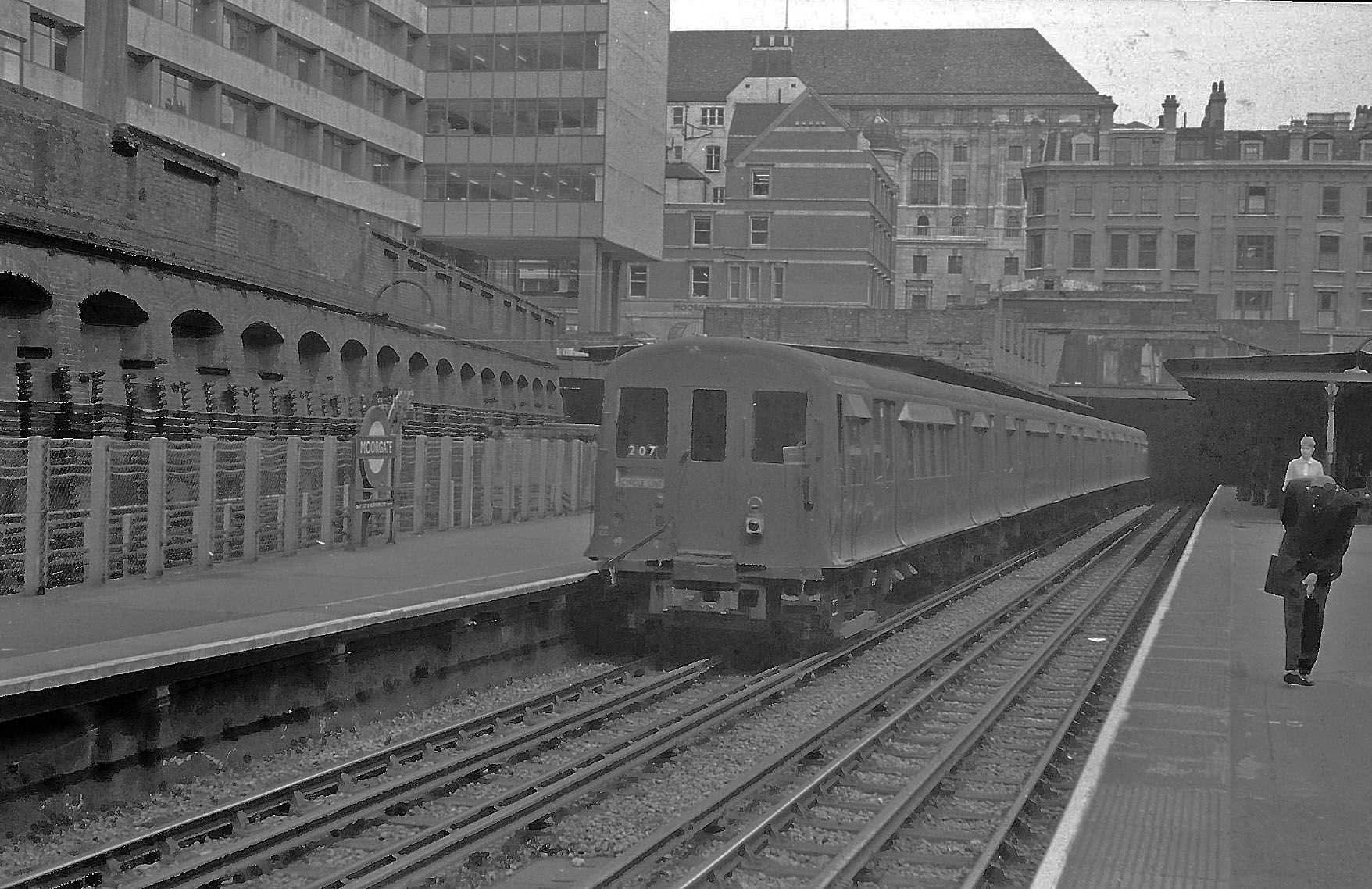
Moorgate station Circle line platforms in 1969, before the sub-surface platforms were rafted over

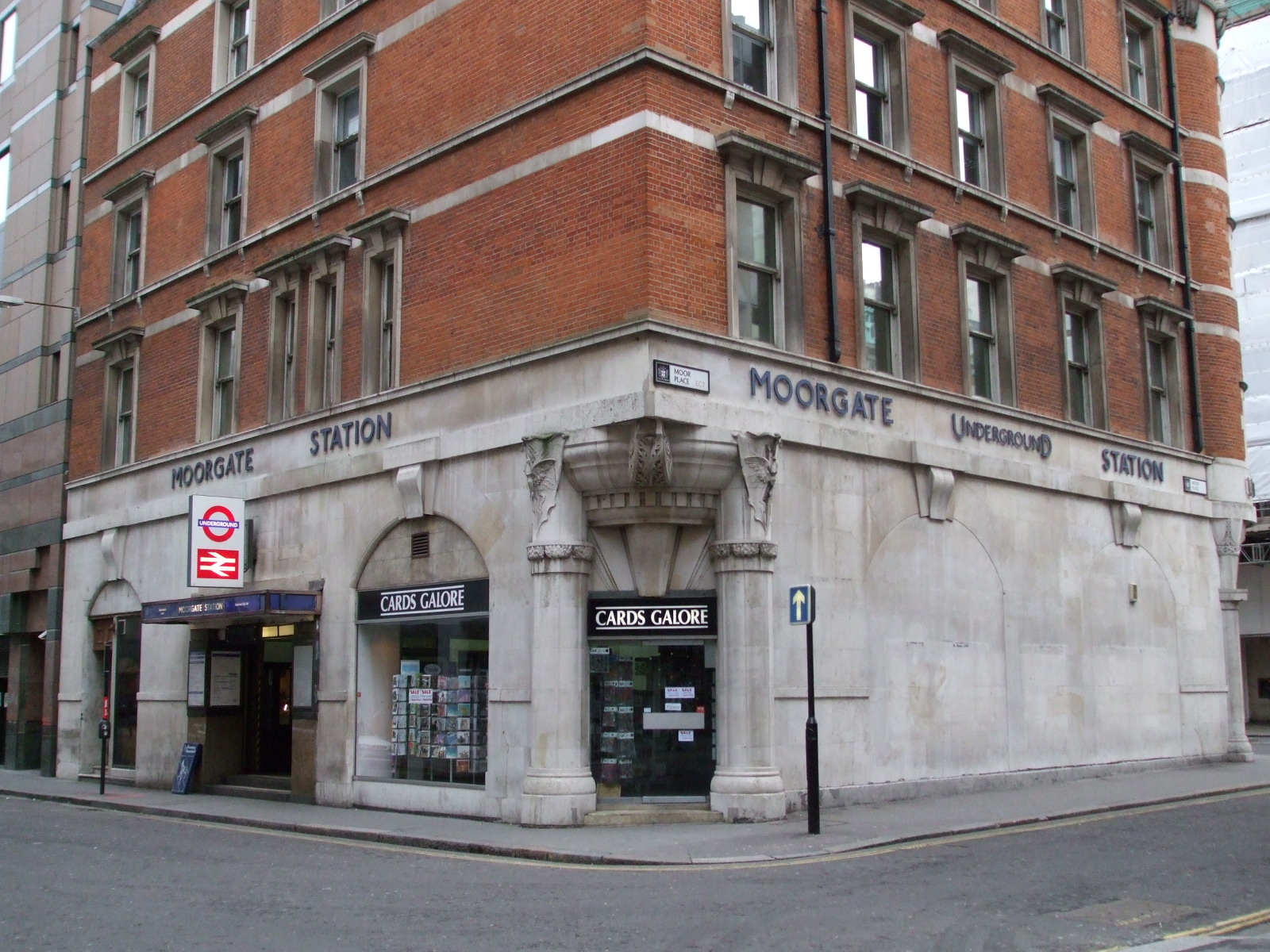
The Moorfields entrance to Moorgate station

British Rail services to Moorgate were initially steam-operated. A commemorative service ran on 6 June 1971 from Moorgate to the depot at Neasden, powered by a 0-6-0 tank locomotive. Steam was replaced by Cravens-built diesel multiple units and British Rail Class 31 locomotives class hauling non-corridor stock which remained in operation until 1976, when it was replaced with British Rail Class 313 electrics.

The Northern City Line connection for Moorgate to Finsbury Park tube was closed beyond Drayton Park on 5 October 1964 to allow work on the Victoria line. The line never re-opened fully, but instead the line was connected to the Finsbury Park British Rail station, in order to provide a connection for suburban services into Moorgate. The new service opened on 1 September 1968.

Moorgate station was completely modernised at platform level and street level in the 1960s, and the Widened Lines part of the station was extended to six platforms. The realignment of the platforms enabled about 500 yd (460 m) of the line to Barbican to be straightened and moved south to facilitate development of the Barbican Estate.

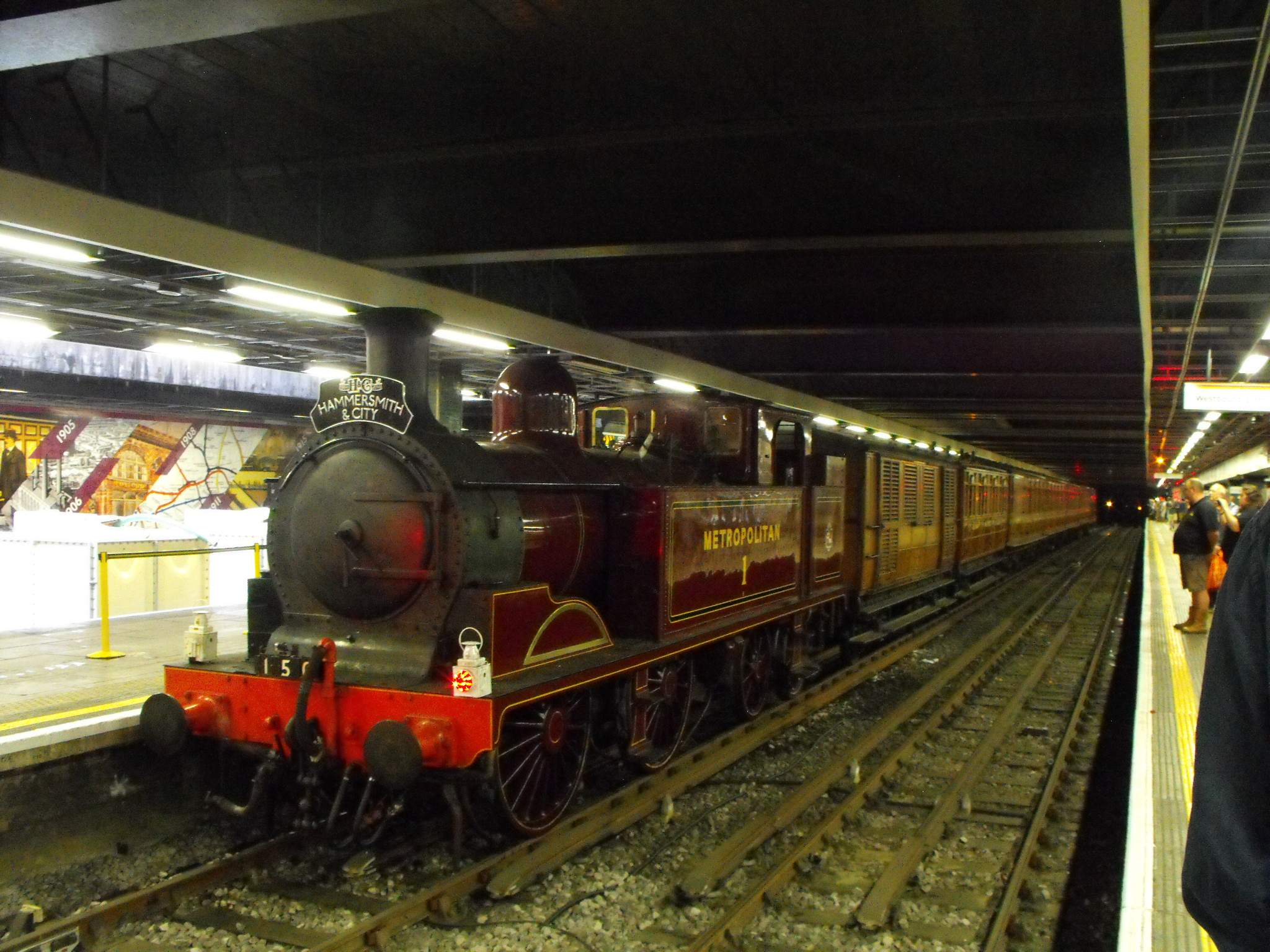
A heritage Metropolitan steam train at Moorgate station in 2014

British Rail (Eastern Region) took over control of the Northern City Line from London Underground in 1975, as part of the Great Northern lines suburban electrification. The Highbury Branch of the Northern line was terminated. Services from Finsbury Park to Moorgate were diverted to the Northern City Line from the City Widened Lines the following year. The City Widened Lines were renamed the Moorgate line when overhead electrification was installed in 1982, allowing the Midland City Line service to run from Bedford via the Midland Main Line to Moorgate. This later formed a branch of the Thameslink route.

The Moorgate Thameslink branch was reduced to peak hours services only in 2003, and closed permanently on 20 March 2009 as part of the Thameslink Programme upgrades. The closure was required in order to lengthen the platforms at Farringdon to take the longer trains, which could only be done southward in the direction of Moorgate as there was too steep a gradient to the north.

Under Crossrail works, the western ticket hall of the Elizabeth line station at Liverpool Street was constructed just east of Moorgate station. This linked the Northern line platforms at Moorgate to the Central line at Liverpool Street via the Elizabeth line platforms spanning the two.

The refurbished entrance on Moorfields opened on 5 July 2021. Upon opening, this provided step-free access to the Circle, Hammersmith & City and Metropolitan line platforms, and later to the Northern line and Elizabeth line when the new line opened on 24 May 2022.

== Accidents and incidents ==
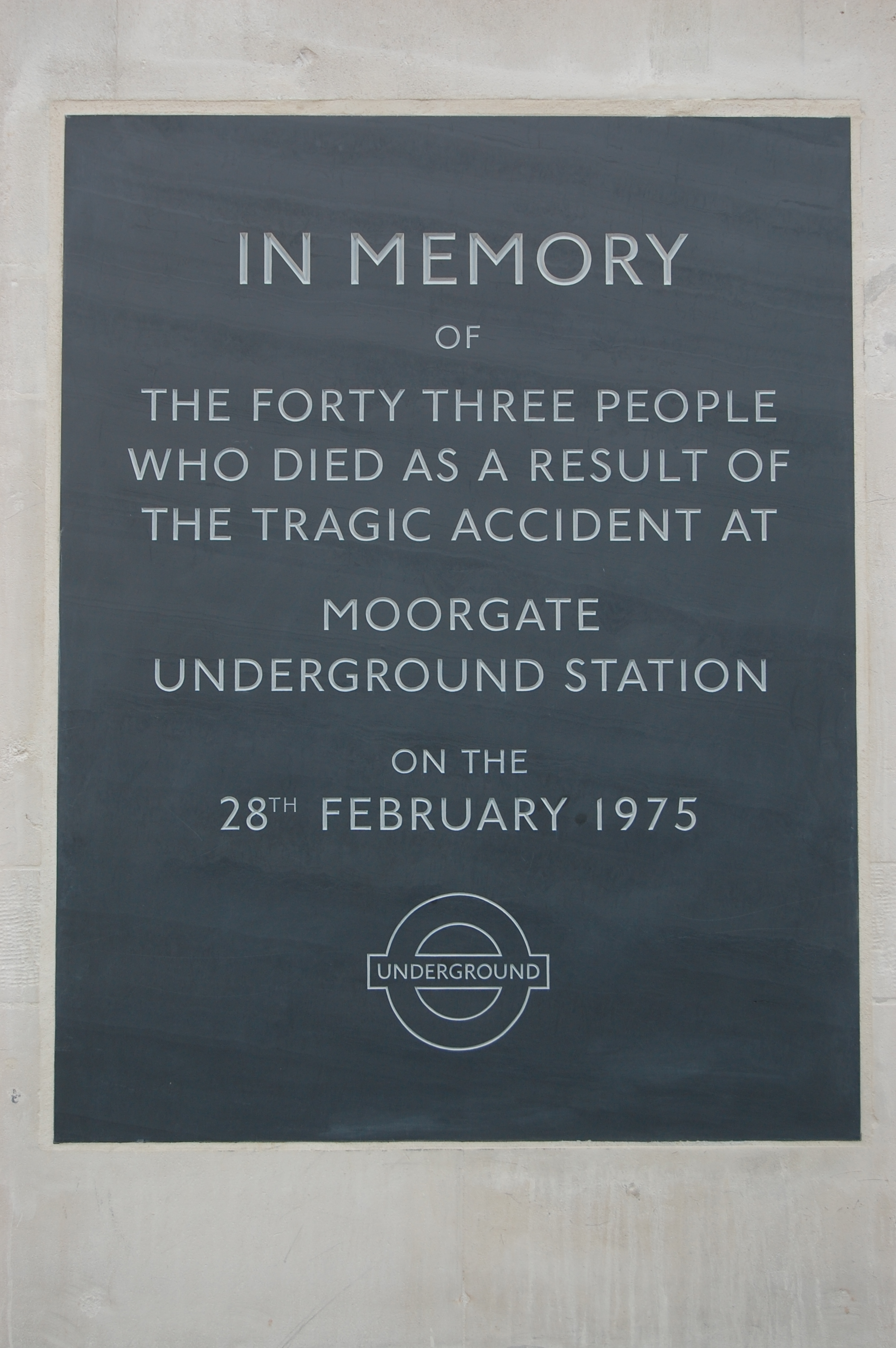
Memorial plaque to the victims of the Moorgate tube crash

On 13 September 1905, a train derailed at the station. There were two injuries.

On 28 February 1975, 43 people were killed and 74 seriously injured in the Moorgate tube crash, when a southbound Northern City Line train crashed into the end of the dead-end tunnel beyond the platform. The accident caused the most fatalities on the Underground during peacetime and has been considered the worst ever on the system. The cause was the unexplained failure of the driver to stop or even slow down at the platform, causing the train to run at speed into the dead-end tunnel, colliding with the buffers and then with the wall. Services were immediately suspended, resuming on 1 March from Drayton Park to Old Street only. The wreckage was not fully cleared until 6 March and the station fully re-opened four days later.

== Infrastructure ==
Trains using the deep level Northern City Line platforms (9 and 10) are supplied with 750 V DC current via the third rail, overseen by York Electrical Control Room. The signalling is track circuit block, overlaid with ERTMS Level 2, controlled by York Rail Operating Centre's Finsbury Park workstation.

The former sub-surface Thameslink bay platforms (5 and 6) were equipped with 25 kV 50 Hz AC overhead line equipment, overseen by York Electrical Control Room. Signalling was track circuit block, multiple aspect colour light signals, controlled by West Hampstead PSB.

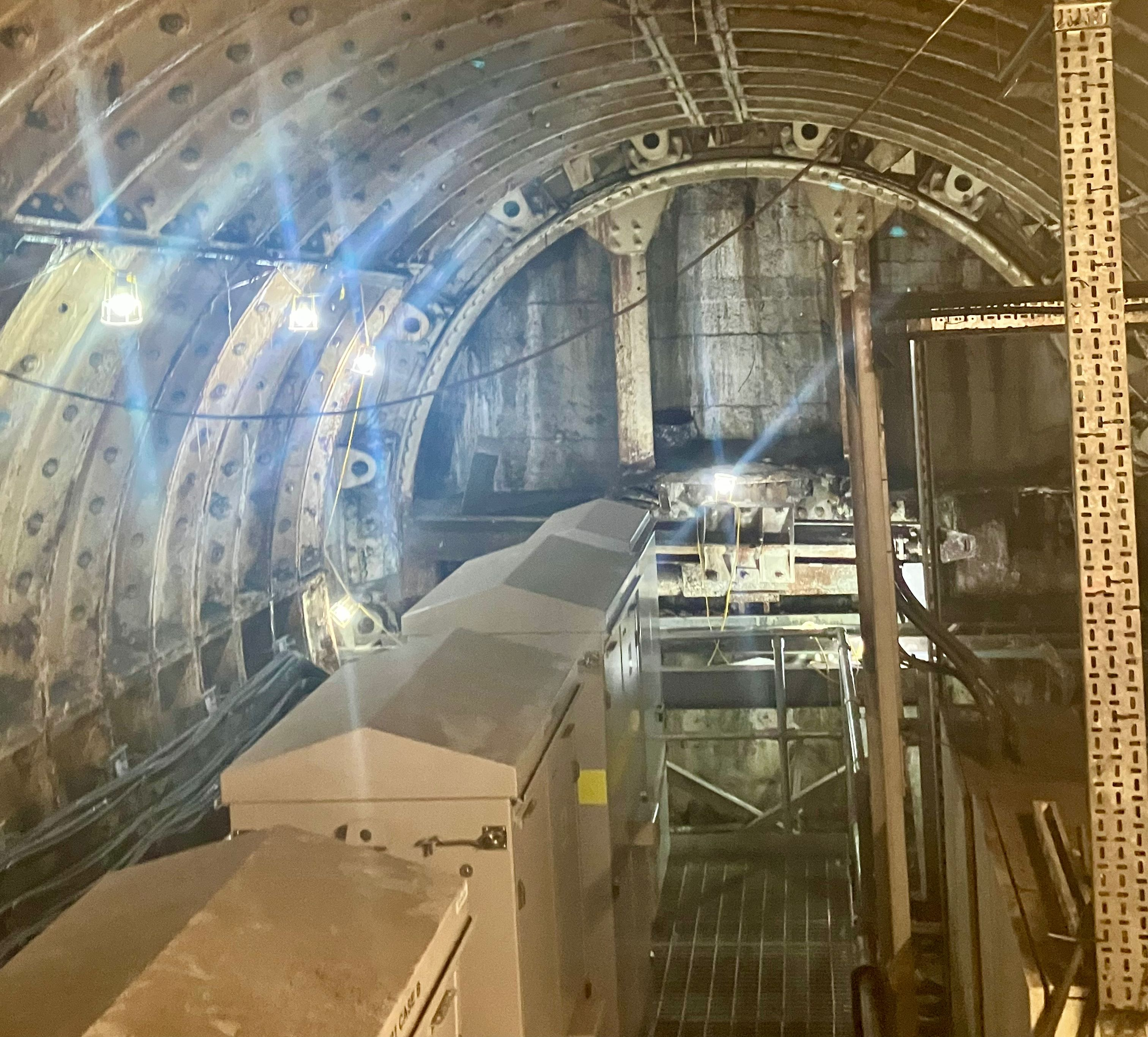
The Greathead shield at the south end of platform 10

South of the Northern City platform 10 is a Greathead tunnelling shield. The shield was used to dig part of a very short planned extension south to Lothbury, quickly abandoned.

== Services ==
=== London Underground ===
On the Circle, Hammersmith & City and Metropolitan lines, Moorgate station is between Barbican to the west and Liverpool Street to the east.

==== Circle line ====
The typical service in trains per hour (tph) is:

- 6 tph Clockwise via Liverpool Street and Tower Hill
- 6 tph Anti-Clockwise via Kings Cross St Pancras and Paddington

==== Hammersmith & City line ====
The typical service in trains per hour (tph) is:

- 6 tph Eastbound to Barking
- 6 tph Westbound to Hammersmith via Paddington

==== Metropolitan line ====
The Metropolitan line is the only line to operate express services from Moorgate, and then only at peak times. Fast services run non-stop between Wembley Park, Harrow-on-the-Hill and Moor Park; semi-fast services run non-stop between Wembley Park and Harrow-on-the-Hill.

The typical off-peak service in trains per hour (tph) is:

- 12 tph Eastbound to Aldgate
- 2 tph Westbound to Amersham (all stations)
- 2 tph Westbound to Chesham (all stations)
- 8 tph Westbound to Uxbridge (all stations)

Off-peak services to/from Watford terminate at Baker Street

The typical peak time service in trains per hour (tph) is:

- 14 tph Eastbound to Aldgate
- 2 tph Westbound to Amersham (fast in the evening peak only)
- 2 tph Westbound to Chesham (fast in the evening peak only)
- 4 tph Westbound to Watford (semi-fast in the evening peak only)
- 6 tph Westbound to Uxbridge (all stations)

==== Northern line ====
On the Northern line via the Bank branch, Moorgate station is between Old Street to the north and Bank to the south.

The typical off-peak service in trains per hour (tph) are:

- 10 tph Northbound to Edgware
- 10 tph Northbound to High Barnet
- 20 tph Southbound to Morden

The typical peak time service in trains per hour (tph) are:

- 12 tph Northbound to Edgware
- 12 tph Northbound to High Barnet
- 24 tph Southbound to Morden

Previously, typical off-peak services include terminating at Colindale to the north and Tooting Broadway to the south.

=== National Rail ===
==== Northern City Line ====
The Northern City Line is part of the Great Northern Route (itself part of the East Coast Main Line). It was formerly a stand-alone part of London Underground's Northern line between Moorgate and Finsbury Park. Typical services at Moorgate off-peak Monday-Friday (all operated by Great Northern):

- 2 tph to Welwyn Garden City via Potters Bar
- 2 tph to Stevenage via Hertford North

During Peak Hours, there are 4 tph to Welwyn Garden City, as well as an additional 2 tph that terminate at Gordon Hill and 2 tph that terminate at Hertford North.

Great Northern introduced a weekend service from 13 December 2015.

Preceding station	London Underground	Following station
Barbican towards Hammersmith via King's Cross St Pancras	Circle line	Liverpool Street towards Edgware Road via Victoria
Barbican towards Hammersmith	Hammersmith & City line	Liverpool Street towards Barking
Barbican towards Uxbridge, Amersham, Chesham or Watford	Metropolitan line	Liverpool Street towards Aldgate
Old Street towards Edgware, Mill Hill East or High Barnet	Northern line Bank branch	Bank towards Morden
Preceding station	National Rail	Following station
Old Street	Great Northern Northern City Line	Terminus
Internal connection
Preceding station	Elizabeth line	Following station
Farringdon towards Reading or Heathrow Airport Terminal 4 or Terminal 5	Elizabeth line transfer at Liverpool Street	Whitechapel towards Abbey Wood or Shenfield
Disused railways
Preceding station	National Rail	Following station
Barbican	First Capital Connect; City Widened Lines	Terminus
Former services
Preceding station	London Underground	Following station
Old Street towards Finsbury Park	Metropolitan line Northern City Branch (1913–39)	Terminus
Old Street towards Finsbury Park	Northern line Northern City Branch (1939–64)	Terminus
Old Street towards Drayton Park	Northern line Northern City Branch (1964–75)	Terminus
Barbican towards Hammersmith	Metropolitan line Hammersmith branch (1864–1990)	Liverpool Street towards Barking
Abandoned Northern Heights proposal
Old Street towards Bushey Heath, High Barnet or Alexandra Palace	Northern line	Terminus
Abandoned Northern City Line extension
Preceding station	London Underground	Following station
Old Street towards Finsbury Park	Metropolitan Railway; Northern City Line	Lothbury; Terminus
