= 1994 Southwark London Borough Council election =

1994 Southwark Council election
- 5 May 1994

All 64 seats up for election to Southwark London Borough Council 33 seats needed for a majority
- Registered: 176,850
- Turnout: 66,373, 37.53% (▼3.01)

	First party	Second party	Third party
Party	Labour	Liberal Democrats	Conservative
Seats won	34	27	3
Seat change	▼3	▲6	▼3
Popular vote	75,944	64,27	20,206
Percentage	47.01%	39.78%	12.51%
Council Control before election
.
Labour
Council Control after election
Labour

Elections to Southwark Council were held in May 1994. The whole council was up for election. Turnout was 36.5%.

== Background ==
In the years between this election an the previous one there was only one by-election called to replace a councillor who had died, which resulted in the seat changing hands from the Labour Party to the Liberal Democrats. In addition, 2 Labour councillors became either members of third parties or independents and 1 seat held by the Liberal Democrats became vacant without enough time before the next election to hold a separate by-election. This meant the composition of the council just before the election was as follows:

↓
34	21	6	2
Labour	Lib Dem	Conservative	Other

== Election result ==

Southwark Local Election Result 1994
Party	Seats	Gains	Losses	Net gain/loss	Seats %	Votes %	Votes	+/−
Labour	34	3	6	▼3	53.1	47.01	75,944	
Liberal Democrats	27	6	0	▲6	42.2	39.78	64,270	
Conservative	3	0	3	▼3	4.7	12.51	20,206	
Militant Labour	0	0	0	Steady	0.00	0.30	482	
Green	0	0	0	Steady	0.00	0.25	410	
Independent	0	0	0	Steady	0.00	0.06	99	
Communist	0	0	0	Steady	0.00	0.06	88	
Third Way	0	0	0	Steady	0.00	0.03	53	
Total	64						161,552	

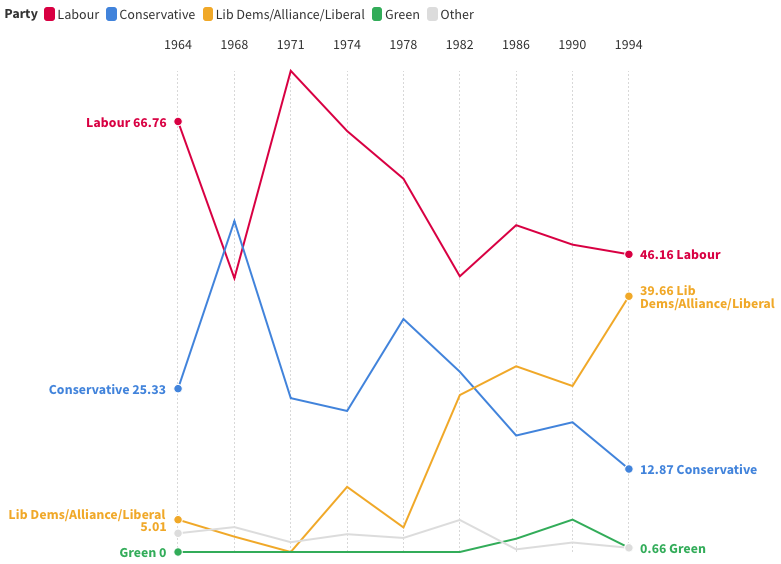
Southwark Council voting history

After the election the composition of the council was as follows:

↓
34	27	3
Labour	Lib Dem	Conservative

== Ward results ==
(*) - Indicates an incumbent candidate

(†) - Indicates an incumbent candidate standing in a different ward

=== Abbey ===
Abbey (2)
Party	Candidate	Votes	%	±%
Liberal Democrats	Alan Blake*	1,252	66.8	+14.3
Liberal Democrats	Steven Gauge*	1,188	63.4	+15.8
Labour	John Johnson^{†} (Note: Johnson was a sitting councillor representing the Chaucer ward)	492	26.2	−12.5
Labour	Richard Livingstone	470	25.1	−10.8
Third Way	Frederick Gerrens	53	2.8	N/A
Conservative	Philip Hammond	52	2.8	−3.1
Conservative	Jon van der Walt	40	2.1	−3.1
Registered electors		4,817		▼18
Turnout		1,875	38.92	▲2.13
Rejected ballots		0	0.00	▼0.28
Liberal Democrats hold				
Liberal Democrats hold				

=== Alleyn ===
Alleyn (2)
Party	Candidate	Votes	%	±%
Labour	Cecile Lothian*	1,175	55.7	+8.3
Labour	Harry Canagasabey	1,126	53.3	+3.0
Conservative	Percy Gray	433	20.5	−9.9
Conservative	William Rowe	430	20.4	−11.3
Liberal Democrats	Shirley Theiner	379	18.0	+10.3
Liberal Democrats	John Egan	370	17.5	+9.0
Registered electors		5,704		▲97
Turnout		2,111	37.01	▼5.95
Rejected ballots		0	0.00	▼0.25
Labour hold				
Labour hold				

=== Barset ===
Barset (2)
Party	Candidate	Votes	%	±%
Labour	Christine Claridge	1,158	73.9	−0.9
Labour	Svetlana Kirov	1,049	66.9	−4.5
Liberal Democrats	Deborah Jones	294	18.8	N/A
Liberal Democrats	David Ramsey	286	18.3	N/A
Conservative	Gladys Cobley	164	10.5	−10.4
Conservative	Roy Taylor	161	10.3	−10.4
Registered electors		4,789		▼65
Turnout		1,573	32.85	▲0.13
Rejected ballots		6	0.38	▼0.56
Labour hold				
Labour hold				

=== Bellenden ===
Bellenden (3)
Party	Candidate	Votes	%	±%
Labour	Howard Latham	2,080	63.6	+2.9
Labour	Mike Lee	2,044	62.5	+3.7
Labour	Anne Worsley	1,971	60.3	+4.3
Liberal Democrats	Alexander Baker	630	19.3	+10.1
Liberal Democrats	Robert Elbert	487	14.9	+6.7
Liberal Democrats	Frank Brean	486	14.9	N/A
Conservative	Miranda Hardie	464	14.2	−5.9
Conservative	Angus Pritchard-Gordon	404	12.4	−6.3
Conservative	Sharon Spiers	388	11.9	−5.4
Registered electors		8,537		▼150
Turnout		3,272	38.33	▼1.72
Rejected ballots		4	0.12	▲0.11
Labour hold				
Labour hold				
Labour hold				

=== Bricklayers ===
Bricklayers (2)
Party	Candidate	Votes	%	±%
Liberal Democrats	Graham Nash*	1,754	67.0	+5.7
Liberal Democrats	Anne Scovell*	1,677	64.1	+5.3
Labour	Robert Cornall	636	24.3	−6.2
Labour	Rosemary Whitlock	623	23.8	−4.6
Conservative	John Williams	118	4.5	−1.1
Conservative	Susan Hammond	105	4.0	−0.9
Registered electors		6,791		▲704
Turnout		2,622	38.61	▼6.24
Rejected ballots		4	0.15	▼0.03
Liberal Democrats hold				
Liberal Democrats hold				

=== Browning ===
Browning (3)
Party	Candidate	Votes	%	±%
Liberal Democrats	Geoffrey Goldie*	1,582	61.1	+8.6
Liberal Democrats	Paul Cheesman*	1,574	60.8	+70
Liberal Democrats	James Munday	1,566	60.5	+8.7
Labour	Martin Green	924	35.7	+0.2
Labour	Peter Hore	885	34.2	−1.2
Labour	Michael Yates	869	33.6	+2.0
Conservative	Elizabeth Buckland	137	5.3	−0.8
Conservative	Alan Sheridan	133	5.1	±0.0
Conservative	Lilian Prince	107	4.1	−0.9
Registered electors		7,953		▲463
Turnout		2,600	32.69	▼5.15
Rejected ballots		11	0.42	▲0.21
Liberal Democrats hold				
Liberal Democrats hold				
Liberal Democrats hold				

=== Brunswick ===
Brunswick (3)
Party	Candidate	Votes	%	±%
Labour	Ian Driver*	1,482	61.2	−6.9
Labour	Lilian Naish*	1,427	58.9	−9.1
Labour	John Friary	1,413	58.3	−9.8
Liberal Democrats	Vivien Maurice* (Note: Maurice was elected in a by-election triggered by the death of Cllr John E. Maurice in 1991)	626	25.8	N/A
Liberal Democrats	Philip Bonnington	617	25.5	N/A
Liberal Democrats	Wendy O'Dowd	568	23.5	N/A
Conservative	Anna-Louise McKinney	154	6.4	−16.8
Conservative	Douglas Mitchell	142	5.9	−14.6
Conservative	Douglas Pearce	128	5.3	−15.0
Registered electors		7,665		▼291
Turnout		2,427	31.66	▼0.37
Rejected ballots		5	0.21	▼0.51
Labour hold				
Labour hold				
Labour hold				

=== Burgess ===
Burgess (2)
Party	Candidate	Votes	%	±%
Liberal Democrats	Rose Colley*	887	53.4	−4.2
Liberal Democrats	Eileen Neale	782	47.1	−6.7
Labour	Simon McKeown	703	42.3	+5.0
Labour	Josephine Clark^{†} (Note: Clark was a sitting councillor representing the Alleyn ward)	690	41.5	+6.5
Conservative	Christina Coyle	73	4.4	+1.0
Conservative	Roger Prince	47	2.8	−0.2
Registered electors		4,565		▲226
Turnout		1,671	36.60	▼3.96
Rejected ballots		9	0.54	▲0.26
Liberal Democrats hold				
Liberal Democrats hold				

=== Cathedral ===
Cathedral (2)
Party	Candidate	Votes	%	±%
Liberal Democrats	Hilary Wines*	1,604	74.9	+14.4
Liberal Democrats	Richard Shearman*	1,442	67.4	+12.8
Labour	Robert Smeath	412	19.2	−11.3
Labour	Nicola Kutapan	361	16.9	−12.1
Conservative	Susan Hardy	73	3.4	−3.7
Conservative	Peter Randall Johnson	53	2.5	−4.5
Communist	Marcella Fitzgerald	31	1.4	N/A
Registered electors		5,148		▼267
Turnout		2,147	41.71	▲0.16
Rejected ballots		6	0.28	▼0.30
Liberal Democrats hold				
Liberal Democrats hold				

=== Chaucer ===
Chaucer (3)
Party	Candidate	Votes	%	±%
Liberal Democrats	Robert Bayne	1,461	45.4	+1.9
Liberal Democrats	Jennifer Thompson	1,415	44.0	+3.4
Labour	Stephan Lancashire	1,410	43.9	+1.0
Liberal Democrats	David Buxton^{†} (Note: Buxton was a sitting councillor representing the Dockyard ward)	1,404	43.7	+4.8
Labour	Matt Tee	1,375	42.8	+0.8
Labour	Rebecca Tee	1,363	42.4	+2.3
Conservative	Ann Buckland	170	5.3	−0.7
Conservative	Lorraine Sheridan	125	3.9	−0.8
Conservative	Charles Hayward	110	3.4	−0.8
Communist	Joyce Fairchild	57	1.8	N/A
Registered electors		8,264		▲296
Turnout		3,215	38.90	▲1.93
Rejected ballots		0	0.00	▼0.10
Liberal Democrats hold				
Liberal Democrats gain from Labour				
Labour hold				

=== College ===
College (2)
Party	Candidate	Votes	%	±%
Conservative	Mark Humphreys	1,202	41.0	−9.3
Conservative	Stephen Charge^{†} (Note: Charge was a sitting councillor representing the Ruskin ward)	1,124	38.4	−10.5
Labour	Sara Ives	947	32.3	−3.5
Labour	Alan Sharples	878	30.0	−5.4
Liberal Democrats	Patricia Mynott	752	25.7	+13.0
Liberal Democrats	Jonathan Price	733	25.0	+13.2
Registered electors		6,121		▲32
Turnout		2,931	47.88	▼3.97
Rejected ballots		2	0.07	▼0.12
Conservative hold				
Conservative hold				

=== Consort ===
Consort (2)
Party	Candidate	Votes	%	±%
Labour	Ian Ritchie	1,040	64.7	−4.4
Labour	Hassan Vahib^{†} (Note: Vahib was a sitting councillor representing the Lyndhurst ward)	858	53.4	−15.7
Liberal Democrats	Jacqueline Tomkins	356	22.1	N/A
Liberal Democrats	Graham Salt	329	20.5	N/A
Conservative	Leslie Brown	198	12.3	−11.3
Conservative	Edmund Franc	141	8.8	−12.5
Registered electors		5,126		▼28
Turnout		1,618	31.56	▼3.91
Rejected ballots		10	0.62	▼0.15
Labour hold				
Labour hold				

=== Dockyard ===
Dockyard (3)
Party	Candidate	Votes	%	±%
Liberal Democrats	Nicholas Barr	2,650	64.2	+17.4
Liberal Democrats	Elizabeth Denton*	2,634	63.8	+17.9
Liberal Democrats	Derek Partridge	2,479	60.0	+14.8
Labour	Benjamin Marshall	1,002	24.3	−9.1
Labour	Aveen McHugh	996	24.1	−6.5
Labour	Lindsay Thomas	902	21.8	−8.5
Conservative	Stephen Holmes	273	6.6	−11.7
Conservative	Anne Peirce	213	5.2	−12.6
Conservative	Mark Tunstill	192	4.7	−12.8
Registered electors		11,939		▲3,024
Turnout		4,141	34.68	▼8.79
Rejected ballots		12	0.29	▲0.01
Liberal Democrats hold				
Liberal Democrats hold				
Liberal Democrats hold				

=== Faraday ===
Faraday (3)
Party	Candidate	Votes	%	±%
Liberal Democrats	Ruth Clark	1,762	46.5	+20.7
Liberal Democrats	Alfred Langley	1,735	45.8	+20.5
Liberal Democrats	Donnachadh McCarthy	1,719	45.3	+21.7
Labour	Charles Cherrill*	1,588	41.9	−8.1
Labour	John Lauder*	1,529	40.3	−7.9
Labour	Lorraine Lauder	1,527	40.3	−11.0
Conservative	Robert Hayward	207	5.5	−6.7
Conservative	Lucy Newmark	205	5.4	−6.6
Conservative	Jennifer Handscomb	197	5.2	−6.4
Registered electors		9,531		▲168
Turnout		3,804	39.91	▲7.71
Rejected ballots		13	0.34	▲0.21
Liberal Democrats gain from Labour				
Liberal Democrats gain from Labour				
Liberal Democrats gain from Labour				

=== Friary ===
Friary (3)
Party	Candidate	Votes	%	±%
Labour	Linda Bailey	1,086	51.7	+2.3
Labour	Joan Khachik	972	46.3	+1.6
Labour	Sonya Murison^{†} (Note: Murison was a sitting councillor representing the Chaucer ward)	968	46.1	+4.1
Liberal Democrats	Christopher Berry	828	39.4	+33.3
Liberal Democrats	Rand Guebert	763	36.3	+30.8
Liberal Democrats	Jonathan Hunt	761	36.2	+31.3
Conservative	Ivy Brown	129	6.1	−4.4
Conservative	May Beaumont	104	5.0	−4.9
Conservative	Nicola Eldridge	101	4.8	−4.7
Registered electors		6,332		▼81
Turnout		2,106	33.26	▼2.56
Rejected ballots		5	0.24	▼0.37
Labour hold				
Labour hold				
Labour hold				

=== Liddle ===
Liddle (3)
Party	Candidate	Votes	%	±%
Labour	Mary Ellery*	1,315	76.6	−5.3
Labour	Daniel McCarthy*	1,191	69.4	−1.5
Labour	Abdur-Rahman Olayiwola	1,111	64.7	−2.9
Liberal Democrats	David Banks	226	13.2	N/A
Liberal Democrats	John Landels	205	11.9	N/A
Liberal Democrats	Rachel Ogunsanya	183	10.7	N/A
Green	Jennifer Wilson	119	6.9	N/A
Conservative	Dennis Herbert	110	6.4	−5.3
Conservative	Vassos Christodoulou	79	4.6	−5.1
Registered electors		8,526		▲39
Turnout		1,720	20.17	▲2.06
Rejected ballots		4	0.23	▼0.81
Labour hold				
Labour hold				
Labour hold				

=== Lyndhurst ===
Lyndhurst (3)
Party	Candidate	Votes	%	±%
Labour	Aubyn Graham*	1,933	59.1	+6.1
Labour	Dermot McInerney	1,881	57.5	+7.6
Labour	Nick Dolezal	1,878	57.4	+12.3
Liberal Democrats	Alistair Milne	603	18.4	+8.4
Liberal Democrats	Paul Heatley	591	18.1	N/A
Conservative	Eleanor Gayler	565	17.3	−13.5
Conservative	Olga Grant	556	17.0	−11.0
Liberal Democrats	Richard Newby	556	17.0	+7.2
Conservative	Doris Pearce	533	16.3	−11.5
Registered electors		8,647		▼133
Turnout		3,278	37.91	▼1.82
Rejected ballots		8	0.24	▲0.15
Labour hold				
Labour hold				
Labour hold				

=== Newington ===
Newington (3)
Party	Candidate	Votes	%	±%
Labour	Jeremy Fraser*	1,876	58.1	+0.5
Labour	Hannah McDonald	1,764	54.6	−3.6
Labour	Robert Wingfield^{†} (Note: Wingfield was a sitting councillor representing the Friary ward)	1,642	50.9	−6.1
Liberal Democrats	Gillian Clemens	916	28.4	+17.0
Liberal Democrats	Ann Christmas	904	28.0	+16.0
Liberal Democrats	Sarah Gurling	783	24.2	+15.4
Conservative	Philip Dixon	293	9.1	−8.2
Conservative	Felicity Malyon	271	8.4	−7.7
Conservative	Richard Malyon	262	8.1	−7.6
Registered electors		8,902		▲127
Turnout		3,240	36.40	▼3.16
Rejected ballots		11	0.34	▲0.20
Labour hold				
Labour hold				
Labour hold				

=== Riverside ===
Riverside (3)
Party	Candidate	Votes	%	±%
Liberal Democrats	George Dunk*	1,461	50.5	+5.3
Liberal Democrats	Betty Olliffe	1,374	47.5	+0.3
Liberal Democrats	Linda Manchester	1,326	45.8	+1.1
Labour	Coral Newell	1,002	34.6	−6.2
Labour	Charles Sawer	926	32.0	−4.0
Labour	John Howard	885	30.6	−3.4
Conservative	Robert Hughes	364	12.6	+4.0
Conservative	Jacqueline Newbury	165	5.7	−2.5
Conservative	William Woods	154	5.3	−1.9
Registered electors		7,473		▲726
Turnout		2,901	38.82	▼3.85
Rejected ballots		8	0.28	▲0.14
Liberal Democrats hold				
Liberal Democrats hold				
Liberal Democrats hold				

=== Rotherhithe ===
Rotherhithe (3)
Party	Candidate	Votes	%	±%
Liberal Democrats	Frank Pemberton*	1,537	63.2	+0.6
Liberal Democrats	Victor Jones*	1,480	60.8	+0.3
Liberal Democrats	Jacqueline Bassom*	1,454	59.8	+1.7
Labour	David Brasier	536	22.0	−5.0
Labour	William Griffiths	497	20.4	−6.9
Labour	Carl Upsall	403	16.6	+0.2
Militant Labour	Joan Francis	168	6.9	N/A
Militant Labour	Lynn Kelly	159	6.5	N/A
Militant Labour	Julie Donovan	155	6.4	N/A
Conservative	Joyce Coomber	88	3.6	−0.2
Conservative	Frances Gray	84	3.5	±0.0
Conservative	Sarah Phillips	70	2.9	−0.3
Registered electors		6,108		▲208
Turnout		2,433	40.05	▼6.24
Rejected ballots		13	0.53	▲0.35
Liberal Democrats hold				
Liberal Democrats hold				
Liberal Democrats hold				

=== Ruskin ===
Ruskin (3)
Party	Candidate	Votes	%	±%
Labour	Michelle Pearce	1,651	39.2	−1.7
Labour	Alan Firminger	1,594	37.9	+2.7
Conservative	Tobias Eckersley*	1,584	37.6	−5.3
Conservative	David Bradbury*	1,577	37.4	−5.6
Conservative	David Harvey	1,486	35.3	−7.5
Labour	Usman Khalid	1,445	34.3	−0.7
Liberal Democrats	Gareth Martin	866	20.6	+10.1
Liberal Democrats	Anna McGettigan^{†} (Note: McGettigan was a sitting councillor representing the Chaucer ward)	841	20.0	+10.2
Liberal Democrats	Jonathan Mitchell	829	19.7	+10.7
Green	Robert Goodman	291	6.9	−7.5
Registered electors		7,488		▼171
Turnout		4,211	56.24	▼1.55
Rejected ballots		0	0.00	▼0.14
Labour gain from Conservative				
Labour gain from Conservative				
Conservative hold				

=== Rye ===
Rye (2)
Party	Candidate	Votes	%	±%
Labour	Niall Duffy	1,493	50.3	+7.3
Labour	Dominic Thorncroft	1,329	44.7	+2.5
Conservative	Irene Kimm*	1,045	35.2	−8.4
Conservative	Alan Buddles	964	32.4	−8.6
Liberal Democrats	Alison Farrow	382	12.9	+7.5
Liberal Democrats	Christine Watson	344	11.6	+5.4
Independent	Garth Robertson	99	3.3	−5.2
Registered electors		6,311		▼254
Turnout		2,986	47.31	▼3.26
Rejected ballots		15	0.50	▲0.38
Labour gain from Conservative				
Labour hold				

=== St Giles ===
St Giles (3)
Party	Candidate	Votes	%	±%
Labour	Vincent Feiner	1,654	63.3	+2.1
Labour	Anthony Ritchie*	1,627	62.3	+3.4
Labour	William Skelly	1,579	60.4	+4.0
Liberal Democrats	Mark Allen	496	19.0	+7.7
Liberal Democrats	Sandra Mason	489	18.7	+7.5
Liberal Democrats	Roy Ashworth	487	18.6	+7.4
Conservative	Clive Jones	283	10.8	−6.4
Conservative	Hugh McKinney	280	10.7	−5.7
Conservative	Peter Lengyel	264	10.1	−6.1
Registered electors		8,918		▲38
Turnout		2,626	29.45	▼3.07
Rejected ballots		13	0.50	▲0.33
Labour hold				
Labour hold				
Labour hold				

=== The Lane ===
The Lane (2)
Party	Candidate	Votes	%	±%
Liberal Democrats	Sarah Harrison	1,201	48.5	+35.6
Liberal Democrats	Nigel Williams	1,177	47.5	+35.9
Labour	Leslie Alden*	1,002	40.5	−17.9
Labour	Ann Bernadt*	1,001	40.4	−15.4
Conservative	John Davenport	138	5.6	−18.1
Conservative	Andrew Mitchell	135	5.5	−18.1
Registered electors		5,726		▼3
Turnout		2,483	43.36	▼3.88
Rejected ballots		6	0.24	▼0.03
Liberal Democrats gain from Labour				
Liberal Democrats gain from Labour				

=== Waverley ===
Waverley (2)
Party	Candidate	Votes	%	±%
Labour	Michael Gibson*	1,252	53.2	+3.5
Labour	Fycsene Sheilds	1,046	44.4	−3.8
Liberal Democrats	Neil Watson	892	37.9	+8.4
Liberal Democrats	Robert Skelly	835	35.5	+7.0
Conservative	Heather Kirby^{†} (Note: Kirby was a sitting councillor representing the College ward)	191	8.1	−9.6
Conservative	Diana Ladas	168	7.1	−9.0
Registered electors		5,469		▼44
Turnout		2,369	43.32	▼4.62
Rejected ballots		15	0.63	▲0.52
Labour hold				
Labour hold				

== By-Elections ==
Browning by-election, 27 April 1995
Party	Candidate	Votes	%	±%
Liberal Democrats	Sarah Gurling	1,378	56.5	−4.0
Labour	Charles Cherrill	855	35.0	−0.7
Ind. Lib Dem	Ronald North	112	4.6	N/A
Conservative	Brooks Newmark	95	3.9	−1.4
Turnout		2,440		
Liberal Democrats hold				

The by-election was called following the resignation of Cllr Munday.

Bellenden by-election, 4 May 1995
Party	Candidate	Votes	%	±%
Labour	Janet Heatley	1,790	73.4	+10.9
Conservative	Sharon Spiers	260	10.7	−1.2
Liberal Democrats	Alexander Baker	257	10.5	−8.8
Ind. Lib Dem	David Osborne	133	5.5	N/A
Turnout				
Labour hold				

The by-election was called following the resignation of Cllr Lee.

Dockyard by-election, 27 July 1995
Party	Candidate	Votes	%	±%
Liberal Democrats	Sandra Dunk	1,236	60.4	−3.4
Labour	Robert Gasson	642	31.4	+7.1
Conservative	Percy Gray	167	8.2	+1.6
Turnout		2,045		
Liberal Democrats hold				

The by-election was called following the resignation of Cllr Denton.

Friary by-election, 3 August 1995
Party	Candidate	Votes	%	±%
Labour	Barrie Hargrove	909	56.6	+10.6
Liberal Democrats	Caroline Pidgeon	650	40.5	+1.1
Ind. Lib Dem	Jacqueline Tomkins	46	2.9	N/A
Turnout		1,605		
Labour hold				

The by-election was called following the resignation of Cllr Murison.

Barset by-election, 26 October 1995
Party	Candidate	Votes	%	±%
Labour	Stephanie Elsy	734	77.9	+11.0
Liberal Democrats	David Buxton	118	12.5	−6.3
Conservative	Robert Hayward	90	9.6	−0.9
Turnout		942		
Labour hold				

The by-election was called following the resignation of Cllr Kirov.

Chaucer by-election, 7 December 1995
Party	Candidate	Votes	%	±%
Labour	Richard Livingstone	1,125	50.1	+7.3
Liberal Democrats	Robert Skelly	1,025	45.6	+0.2
Independent Green	Doreen Robinson	97	4.3	N/A
Turnout		2,247		
Labour gain from Liberal Democrats				

The by-election was called following the resignation of Cllr Bayne.

Browning by-election, 20 March 1996
Party	Candidate	Votes	%	±%
Liberal Democrats	Joyce Hales	1,191	64.1	+3.3
Labour	Eudora Dixon-Fyle	668	35.9	+0.2
Turnout		1,859		
Liberal Democrats hold				

The by-election was called following the resignation of Cllr Cheesman.

Waverley by-election, 23 October 1997
Party	Candidate	Votes	%	±%
Labour	Michael Barnard	410	79.6	+35.2
Conservative	Rebecca Humphreys	105	20.4	+12.3
Majority		305	59.2	
Turnout		515		
Labour hold				

The by-election was called following the resignation of Cllr Sheilds.
