= 1998 Southwark London Borough Council election =

1998 local election in England

1998 Southwark Council election
- 7 May 1998

All 64 seats up for election to Southwark London Borough Council 33 seats needed for a majority
- Registered: 161,781
- Turnout: 53,202, 32.89% (▼4.64)

	First party	Second party	Third party
Leader	Niall Duffy	Unknown	Unknown
Party	Labour	Liberal Democrats	Conservative
Leader since	1997	Unknown	Unknown
Leader's seat	Rye	Unknown	Unknown
Last election	34 seats, 47.56%	27 seats, 39.16%	3 seats, 12.57%
Seats won	33	27	4
Seat change	▼1	Steady	▲1
Popular vote	58,887	46,288	16,654
Percentage	46.28%	36.38%	13.09%
Council Control before election
.
Labour
Council Control after election
Labour

Elections to Southwark Council were held on 7 May 1998. The whole council was up for election. Turnout was 32.9%.

== Background ==
In between the 1994 election and this election there were a total of 8 by-elections to replace councillors who resigned from their seat, however only 1 seat actually changed hands going from the Liberal Democrats to the Labour Party. In addition to this change there were also 2 other Labour councillor who defected fo third parties, which meant the composition of the council just before the election was as follows:

↓
33	26	3	2
Labour	Lib Dem	Conservative	Other

== Election result ==
1998 Southwark London Borough Council local election results
Party	Seats	Gains	Losses	Net gain/loss	Seats %	Votes %	Votes	+/−
Labour	33	3	4	▼1	51.56	46.28	58,887	
Liberal Democrats	27	3	3	Steady	42.19	36.38	46,288	
Conservative	4	1	0	▲1	6.25	13.09	16,654	
Green	0	0	0	Steady	0.00	2.74	3,487	
Socialist Labour	0	0	0	Steady	0.00	0.82	1,047	
Independent	0	0	0	Steady	0.00	0.57	727	
National Democrats	0	0	0	Steady	0.00	0.12	156	
Total	64						127,246	

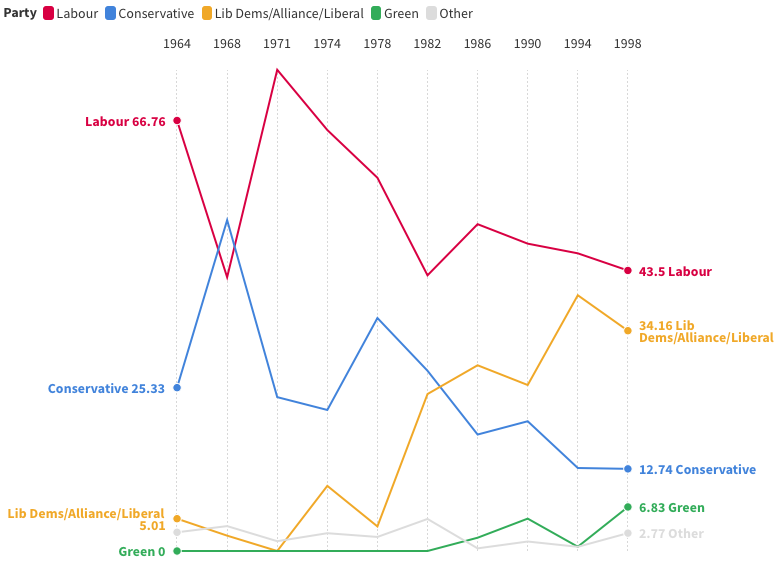
Southwark Council voting history

After the election the composition of the council was as follows:

↓
33	27	4
Labour	Lib Dem	Conservative

== Ward results ==
(*) - Indicates an incumbent candidate

(†) - indicates an incumbent candidate standing in a different ward

=== Abbey ===
Abbey (2)
Party	Candidate	Votes	%	±%
Liberal Democrats	Linda Manchester^{†} (Note: Manchester was a sitting councillor representing the Riverside ward)	1,023	67.6	+0.8
Liberal Democrats	Richard Thomas	818	54.0	−9.4
Labour	John Lauder	510	33.7	+7.5
Labour	Keith Cross	436	28.8	+3.7
Green	Chloe Wilson	80	5.3	N/A
Conservative	Peter Randall Johnson	79	5.2	+2.4
Conservative	Eleanor Gayler	71	4.7	+2.6
Registered electors		4,684		▼133
Turnout		1,523	32.51	▼6.41
Rejected ballots		9	0.59	▲0.59
Liberal Democrats hold				
Liberal Democrats hold				

=== Alleyn ===
Alleyn (2)
Party	Candidate	Votes	%	±%
Labour	Norma Gibbes	887	51.9	−3.8
Labour	Howard Latham^{†} (Note: Latham was a sitting councillor representing the Bellenden ward)	867	50.7	−2.6
Conservative	Andrew Mitchell	324	18.9	−1.6
Liberal Democrats	Alexander Baker	279	16.3	−1.7
Conservative	Roger Prince	271	15.8	−4.6
Liberal Democrats	Henry Hardy	236	13.8	−3.7
Green	Sharon Hogan	223	13.0	N/A
Registered electors		5,100		▼604
Turnout		1,724	33.80	▼3.21
Rejected ballots		14	0.82	▲0.82
Labour hold				
Labour hold				

=== Barset ===
Barset (2)
Party	Candidate	Votes	%	±%
Labour	Christine Claridge*	687	65.0	−8.9
Labour	Charles Cherrill	597	56.5	−10.4
Liberal Democrats	Jonathan Hunt	174	16.5	−2.3
Liberal Democrats	Mark Allen	170	16.1	−2.2
Conservative	Michelle Lowe	112	10.6	+0.1
Green	Paul Barker	110	10.4	N/A
Conservative	Shirley Winchester	98	9.3	−1.0
Registered electors		4,332		▼457
Turnout		1,065	24.58	▼8.27
Rejected ballots		8	0.75	▲0.37
Labour hold				
Labour hold				

=== Bellenden ===
Bellenden (3)
Party	Candidate	Votes	%	±%
Labour	Janet Heatley*	1,585	67.3	+3.7
Labour	Patrick Kelly	1,428	60.7	−1.8
Labour	Andrew Simmons	1,332	56.6	−3.7
Liberal Democrats	Gareth Martin	344	14.6	−4.7
Liberal Democrats	Patricia Macnaughton	343	14.6	−0.3
Liberal Democrats	Albert Bosworth	342	14.5	−0.4
Green	June Veitch	302	12.8	N/A
Conservative	Rupert Cutler	241	10.2	−4.0
Conservative	John Davenport	238	10.1	−2.3
Conservative	Margaret Stewart	232	9.9	−2.0
Registered electors		7,612		▼925
Turnout		2,373	31.17	▼7.16
Rejected ballots		19	0.80	▲0.68
Labour hold				
Labour hold				
Labour hold				

=== Bricklayers ===
Bricklayers (2)
Party	Candidate	Votes	%	±%
Liberal Democrats	Graham Nash*	1,218	63.3	−3.7
Liberal Democrats	Denise Capstick	1,194	62.1	−2.0
Labour	Rupert Doyle	510	26.5	+2.2
Labour	Rosemary Whitlock	468	24.3	+0.5
Conservative	Julian Pratt	77	4.0	−0.4
Conservative	Kenneth Norris	54	2.8	−1.2
Registered electors		6,670		▲121
Turnout		1,940	29.09	▼9.52
Rejected ballots		16	0.82	▲0.67
Liberal Democrats hold				
Liberal Democrats hold				

=== Browning ===
Browning (3)
Party	Candidate	Votes	%	±%
Liberal Democrats	Catherine Bowman	1,198	52.6	−8.5
Liberal Democrats	Roland Shannon	1,163	51.1	−9.7
Liberal Democrats	Neil Watson	1,076	47.3	−13.2
Labour	Anne Keane	853	37.5	+1.8
Labour	Angela Molloy	820	36.0	+1.8
Labour	Kevin McNicholas	788	34.6	+1.0
Conservative	Kenneth Duke	59	2.6	−2.7
Conservative	Olga Grant	57	2.5	−2.6
Conservative	Penelope Foord	51	2.2	−1.9
Registered electors		6,868		▼1,085
Turnout		2,283	33.24	▲0.55
Rejected ballots		6	0.26	▼0.16
Liberal Democrats hold				
Liberal Democrats hold				
Liberal Democrats hold				

=== Brunswick ===
Brunswick (3)
Party	Candidate	Votes	%	±%
Labour	Lillian Naish*	1,044	62.0	+3.1
Labour	John Friary*	1,041	61.8	+3.5
Labour	Robert Wingfield^{†} (Note: Wingfield was a sitting councillor representing the Newington ward)	828	49.1	−12.1
Liberal Democrats	Frances Blango	283	16.8	−9.0
Liberal Democrats	Jeffrey Hook	271	16.1	−9.4
Liberal Democrats	Joyce Martin	271	16.1	−7.4
Green	Jenny Jones	269	16.0	N/A
Conservative	Linda Stanbury	146	8.7	+2.3
Conservative	Steven Stanbury	131	7.8	+1.9
Conservative	Mark Tunstill	118	7.0	+1.7
Registered electors		6,883		▼782
Turnout		1,690	24.55	▼7.11
Rejected ballots		5	0.30	▼0.09
Labour hold				
Labour hold				
Labour hold				

=== Burgess ===
Burgess (2)
Party	Candidate	Votes	%	±%
Liberal Democrats	Jeremy Halley	769	47.7	−5.7
Liberal Democrats	Kenneth Mizzi	763	47.3	+0.2
Labour	Richard Livingstone^{†} (Note: Livingstone was a sitting councillor representing the Chaucer ward)	658	40.8	−0.7
Labour	Simon McKeown	636	39.5	−2.8
Green	Tarik Theodorus	53	3.3	N/A
Conservative	Charles Joseph	48	3.0	−1.4
Conservative	Victoria Joseph	43	2.7	−0.1
Registered electors		4,084		▲481
Turnout		1,623	39.74	▼3.14
Rejected ballots		11	0.68	▼0.14
Liberal Democrats hold				
Liberal Democrats hold				

=== Cathedral ===
Cathedral (2)
Party	Candidate	Votes	%	±%
Liberal Democrats	Hilary Wines*	1,197	67.1	−7.8
Liberal Democrats	Clifford Hodson	878	49.2	−18.2
Labour	Jacqueline Gilmartin	452	25.3	+6.1
Labour	Michael Gibson^{†} (Note: Gibson was a sitting councillor representing the Waverley ward)	428	24.0	+7.1
Green	David Turner	79	4.4	N/A
Conservative	Beatrice Crabb	60	3.4	±0.0
Conservative	Lucy Newmark	49	2.7	+0.2
Registered electors		5,424		
Turnout		1,794	33.08	▼8.66
Rejected ballots		10	0.56	▼0.28
Liberal Democrats hold				
Liberal Democrats hold				

=== Chaucer ===
Chaucer (3)
Party	Candidate	Votes	%	±%
Labour	Stephen Lancashire*	1,315	47.9	+4.0
Liberal Democrats	Alom Shaha	1,193	43.5	−1.9
Labour	Henry Canagasabey^{†} (Note: Canagasabey was a sitting councillor representing the Alleyn ward)	1,167	42.5	−0.3
Labour	Anne Worsley^{†} (Note: Worsley was a sitting councillor representing the Bellenden ward)	1,157	42.1	−0.3
Liberal Democrats	Raffaella Ayorinde	1,104	40.2	−3.8
Liberal Democrats	Robert Skelly	1,098	40.0	−3.7
Conservative	Susan Hardy	145	5.3	±0.0
Conservative	Frances Gray	142	5.2	+1.3
Conservative	Anne Peirce	106	3.9	+0.5
Registered electors		7,711		▼553
Turnout		2,749	35.65	▼3.25
Rejected ballots		4	0.15	▲0.15
Labour hold				
Liberal Democrats hold				
Labour gain from Liberal Democrats				

=== College ===
College (2)
Party	Candidate	Votes	%	±%
Conservative	Mark Humphreys*	1,245	52.6	+11.6
Conservative	William Rowe	1,086	45.9	+7.5
Labour	Carol Britton	810	34.2	+1.9
Labour	Ivan House	790	33.4	+3.4
Liberal Democrats	Patricia Mynott	273	11.5	−14.2
Liberal Democrats	Richard Newby	234	9.9	−15.1
Green	Tamra Poorun	88	3.7	N/A
Registered electors		5,478		▼643
Turnout		2,375	43.36	▼4.52
Rejected ballots		10	0.42	▲0.35
Conservative hold				
Conservative hold				

=== Consort ===
Consort (2)
Party	Candidate	Votes	%	±%
Labour	Nicola Kutapan	514	48.3	−16.4
Labour	Hassan Vahib*	437	41.0	−12.4
Liberal Democrats	David Banks	286	26.9	+4.8
Liberal Democrats	Vanessa Salawu	201	18.9	−1.6
Conservative	Rachel Read	112	10.5	−1.8
Conservative	Doris Pearce	110	10.3	+1.5
Green	Brendan Connolly	101	9.5	N/A
Socialist Labour	Angela Ruddock	88	8.3	N/A
Registered electors		4,614		▼512
Turnout		1,079	23.39	▼8.17
Rejected ballots		14	1.30	▲0.68
Labour hold				
Labour hold				

=== Dockyard ===
Dockyard (3)
Party	Candidate	Votes	%	±%
Liberal Democrats	Derek Partridge*	1,899	54.7	−5.3
Liberal Democrats	Anne Yates	1,888	54.3	−9.9
Liberal Democrats	Columba Blango	1,830	52.7	−11.1
Labour	Daniel Griffiths	886	25.5	+1.2
Labour	Shirley Oldhamstead	827	23.8	−0.3
Labour	Linda Oram	816	23.5	−0.3
Conservative	Percy Gray	351	10.1	+3.5
Conservative	Stephen Crabb	323	9.3	+4.1
Conservative	Ewan Wallace	312	9.0	+4.3
Green	Andrew Flude	202	5.8	N/A
National Democrats	Gary Cartwright	156	4.5	N/A
Registered electors		13,377		▲1,438
Turnout		3,499	26.16	▼8.52
Rejected ballots		25	0.71	▲0.42
Liberal Democrats hold				
Liberal Democrats hold				
Liberal Democrats hold				

=== Faraday ===
Faraday (3)
Party	Candidate	Votes	%	±%
Liberal Democrats	Ruth Clark*	1,234	48.8	+2.3
Liberal Democrats	Alfred Langley*	1,186	46.9	+1.1
Liberal Democrats	David Noakes	1,121	44.3	−1.0
Labour	Lorraine Lauder	1,012	40.0	−0.3
Labour	Lee Garrett	999	39.5	−2.4
Labour	Royston Webb	926	36.6	−3.7
Conservative	Charles Flower	162	6.4	+1.0
Conservative	Robert Hayward	127	5.0	−0.5
Conservative	Robert Goodrick	108	4.3	−0.9
Registered electors		8,596		▼935
Turnout		2,561	29.79	▼10.12
Rejected ballots		31	1.21	▲0.87
Liberal Democrats hold				
Liberal Democrats hold				
Liberal Democrats hold				

=== Friary ===
Friary (3)
Party	Candidate	Votes	%	±%
Labour	Barrie Hargrove* (Note: Hargove was elected in a by-election triggered by the resignation of Cllr. Sonya Murison in 1995)	845	52.8	+1.1
Labour	Joan Khachik*	761	47.6	+1.3
Labour	Frank Pemberton^{†} (Note: Pemberton was a sitting councillor representing the Rotherhithe ward who was originally elected as a Liberal Democratic councillor)	647	40.4	−5.7
Liberal Democrats	Daniel Dougherty	299	18.7	−20.7
Socialist Labour	Ann Goss	265	16.6	N/A
Socialist Labour	Gloria Fagbenro	262	16.4	N/A
Liberal Democrats	Eliza Mann	252	15.8	−20.5
Socialist Labour	Tony Goss	248	15.5	N/A
Liberal Democrats	Keith Miller	238	14.9	−21.3
Green	Laurence Jones	145	9.1	N/A
Conservative	Leslie Brown	120	7.5	+2.5
Conservative	Ivy Brown	111	6.9	+0.8
Conservative	Iris Smith	93	5.8	+1.0
Registered electors		5,440		▼892
Turnout		1,610	29.60	▼3.66
Rejected ballots		10	0.62	▲0.38
Labour hold				
Labour hold				
Labour hold				

=== Liddle ===
Liddle (3)
Party	Candidate	Votes	%	±%
Labour	Mary Ellery*	891	57.9	−18.7
Labour	William Kayada	794	51.6	−17.8
Labour	William Skelly^{†} (Note: Skelly was a sitting councillor representing the St Giles ward)	710	46.1	−18.6
Liberal Democrats	Raouf Ben-Salem	534	34.7	+31.5
Liberal Democrats	Danny McCarthy* (Note: McCarthy was initially elected as a Labour councillor)	488	31.7	−37.7
Liberal Democrats	Josephine Almond	456	29.6	+17.7
Independent	Maria Williams	129	8.4	N/A
Green	Caroline Jones	80	5.2	−1.7
Conservative	Stephen Phillips	55	3.6	−2.8
Conservative	Jane Maclaren	48	3.1	−1.5
Conservative	Victor Smith	47	3.1	N/A
Registered electors		5,046		▼3,480
Turnout		1,543	30.58	▲10.41
Rejected ballots		4	0.26	▲0.03
Labour hold				
Labour hold				
Labour hold				

=== Lyndhurst ===
Lyndhurst (3)
Party	Candidate	Votes	%	±%
Labour	Glenn Cope	1,268	53.0	−6.1
Labour	Nick Dolezal*	1,220	51.0	−6.4
Labour	Dermot McInerney*	1,048	43.8	−13.7
Independent	Ashwinkumar Tanna	598	25.0	N/A
Green	Rebecca Elvey	366	15.3	N/A
Liberal Democrats	Hugh Harris	354	14.8	−3.6
Conservative	Patrick Wollocombe	334	14.0	−3.3
Conservative	Angus Pritchard-Gordon	330	13.8	−3.2
Conservative	Christopher Pincher	320	13.4	−2.9
Liberal Democrats	Matt Flynn	279	11.7	−6.4
Liberal Democrats	Branko Markic	233	9.7	−7.3
Registered electors		7,906		▼741
Turnout		2,415	30.55	▼7.36
Rejected ballots		22	0.91	▲0.67
Labour hold				
Labour hold				
Labour hold				

=== Newington ===
Newington (3)
Party	Candidate	Votes	%	±%
Liberal Democrats	Caroline Pidgeon	1,528	49.7	+21.3
Liberal Democrats	James Gurling	1,481	48.2	+20.2
Liberal Democrats	Jelil Ladipo	1,418	46.2	+22.0
Labour	Hannah McDonald*	1,255	40.9	−13.7
Labour	Leslie Alden	1,157	37.7	−20.4
Labour	Robert Smeath	1,104	35.9	−15.0
Conservative	Susan Hornby	151	4.9	−4.2
Conservative	Clive Jones	122	4.0	−4.4
Conservative	Brooks Newmark	112	3.6	−4.5
Registered electors		7,930		▼972
Turnout		3,094	39.02	▼2.62
Rejected ballots		22	0.71	▲0.37
Liberal Democrats gain from Labour				
Liberal Democrats gain from Labour				
Liberal Democrats gain from Labour				

=== Riverside ===
Riverside (3)
Party	Candidate	Votes	%	±%
Liberal Democrats	Betty Olliffe*	1,306	50.0	+2.5
Liberal Democrats	Alex L'Estrange	1,254	48.0	−2.5
Liberal Democrats	Nicholas Stanton	1,225	46.9	+1.1
Labour	Coral Newell	1,020	39.1	+4.5
Labour	Peter John	1,005	38.5	+6.5
Labour	Amanda Purdon	895	34.3	+3.7
Conservative	Stephen Holmes	130	5.0	−7.6
Conservative	John Liddiard	119	4.6	−1.1
Conservative	John Williams	112	4.3	−1.0
Green	Swadesh Poorun	83	3.2	N/A
Registered electors		7,379		▼94
Turnout		2,627	35.60	▼3.22
Rejected ballots		16	0.61	▲0.33
Liberal Democrats hold				
Liberal Democrats hold				
Liberal Democrats hold				

=== Rotherhithe ===
Rotherhithe (3)
Party	Candidate	Votes	%	±%
Liberal Democrats	Beverley Bassom	1,063	54.7	−5.1
Liberal Democrats	Victor Jones*	1,037	53.3	−7.5
Liberal Democrats	Niko Barr^{†} (Note: Barr was a sitting councillor representing the Dockyard ward)	972	50.0	−13.2
Labour	Neil Fell	656	33.7	+11.7
Labour	Robert Gasson	655	33.7	+13.3
Labour	Francis Treml	455	23.4	+6.8
Conservative	Nathan Chart	108	5.6	+2.0
Conservative	John McConnell	93	4.8	+1.3
Conservative	Jon van der Walt	66	3.4	+0.5
Registered electors		6,455		▲347
Turnout		1,956	30.30	▼9.75
Rejected ballots		11	0.56	▲0.03
Liberal Democrats hold				
Liberal Democrats hold				
Liberal Democrats hold				

=== Ruskin ===
Ruskin (3)
Party	Candidate	Votes	%	±%
Conservative	Tobias Eckersley*	1,703	46.3	+8.7
Labour	Michelle Pearce*	1,604	43.6	+4.4
Conservative	David Bradbury	1,602	43.5	+6.1
Conservative	Irene Kimm	1,525	41.5	+6.2
Labour	Alan Firminger*	1,517	41.2	+3.3
Labour	Charlie Smith	1,379	37.5	+3.2
Liberal Democrats	Jean Halden	352	9.6	−11.0
Liberal Democrats	Robert Elbert	326	8.9	−11.1
Liberal Democrats	Stephen Fletcher	313	8.5	−11.2
Green	Harriet Einsiedel	273	7.4	+0.5
Registered electors		6,934		▼554
Turnout		3,699	53.35	▼2.89
Rejected ballots		20	0.54	▲0.54
Conservative hold				
Labour hold				
Conservative gain from Labour				

=== Rye ===
Rye (2)
Party	Candidate	Votes	%	±%
Labour	Niall Duffy*	1,266	53.4	+3.1
Labour	Dominic Thorncroft*	968	40.8	−3.9
Conservative	Nicholas Vineall	643	27.1	−8.1
Conservative	Edwin Webster	624	26.3	−6.1
Green	Storm Poorun	458	19.3	N/A
Liberal Democrats	Ron Halden	224	9.4	−3.5
Liberal Democrats	Mark Valladeres	171	7.2	−4.4
Registered electors		5,893		▼418
Turnout		2,376	40.32	▼6.99
Rejected ballots		4	0.17	▼0.33
Labour hold				
Labour hold				

=== St Giles ===
St Giles (3)
Party	Candidate	Votes	%	±%
Labour	Stephanie Elsy^{†} (Note: Giles was a sitting councillor representing the Barset ward)	1,288	58.8	−4.5
Labour	Anthony Ritchie*	1,251	57.1	−5.2
Labour	Dora Dixon-Fyle	1,216	55.5	−4.9
Liberal Democrats	Stuart Carr	365	16.7	−2.3
Liberal Democrats	Alison Farrow	344	15.7	−3.0
Green	Glynis Bell	336	15.3	N/A
Liberal Democrats	Samantha McDonough	335	15.3	−3.3
Conservative	Tania Brisby	236	10.8	±0.0
Conservative	Jeremy Hart	203	9.3	−1.4
Socialist Labour	Eileen Miles	184	8.4	N/A
Conservative	Margaret Fordham	182	8.3	−1.8
Registered electors		7,590		▼1,328
Turnout		2,210	29.12	▼0.33
Rejected ballots		19	0.86	▲0.36
Labour hold				
Labour hold				
Labour hold				

=== The Lane ===
The Lane (2)
Party	Candidate	Votes	%	±%
Labour	Robert Cornall	842	46.3	+5.8
Labour	Aubyn Graham^{†} (Note: Graham was a sitting councillor representing the Lyndhurst ward)	756	41.6	+1.2
Liberal Democrats	Colin Hunte	706	38.9	−9.6
Liberal Democrats	Krishnaveni Brown	671	36.9	−10.6
Conservative	George Humphreys	118	6.5	+0.9
Green	Roxana Rizvi	110	6.1	N/A
Conservative	Anthony Kimm	102	5.6	+0.1
Registered electors		5,067		▼659
Turnout		1,829	36.10	▼7.26
Rejected ballots		12	0.66	▲0.42
Labour gain from Liberal Democrats				
Labour gain from Liberal Democrats				

=== Waverley ===
Waverley (2)
Party	Candidate	Votes	%	±%
Labour	Michael Barnard*	1,006	64.5	+11.3
Labour	Vivienne Todd	897	57.5	+3.1
Liberal Democrats	Karnagie Ayling	266	17.1	−20.8
Liberal Democrats	Rita Perrett-Hodson	241	15.4	−20.1
Conservative	Lilian Dawson	182	11.7	+3.6
Conservative	Rebecca Humphreys	175	11.2	+4.1
Green	Jason Evers	129	8.3	N/A
Registered electors		4,708		▼761
Turnout		1,565	33.24	▼10.08
Rejected ballots		5	0.32	▼0.31
Labour hold				
Labour hold				

== By-Elections ==
Consort by-election, 15 October 1998
Party	Candidate	Votes	%	±%
Labour	Anne Worsley	919	58.5	+10.2
Liberal Democrats	Colin Hunte	474	30.2	+3.3
Socialist Labour	Angela Ruddock	70	4.5	−3.8
Conservative	Oliver Wooller	54	3.4	−7.1
Liberal	Geoffrey Goldie	53	3.4	N/A
Majority		450	28.3	
Turnout		1,570	34.0	+10.6
Labour hold				

The by-election was called following the resignation of Cllr Kutapan.

Rotherhithe by-election, 3 December 1998
Party	Candidate	Votes	%	±%
Liberal Democrats	Jeffrey Hook	1,143	55.7	+2.4
Labour	Peter John	813	39.6	+5.9
National Democrats	Gary Cartwright	56	2.7	N/A
Conservative	Steven Bolton	28	1.4	−4.2
Green	Storm Poorun	11	0.5	N/A
Majority		330	16.1	
Turnout		2,051	32.0	+1.7
Liberal Democrats hold				

The by-election was called following the death of Cllr Jones.

Cathedral by-election, 22 July 1999
Party	Candidate	Votes	%	±%
Liberal Democrats	Stephen Bosch	750	59.6	+10.4
Labour	Bernard Dainton	451	35.9	+10.6
Conservative	Ewan Wallace	57	4.5	+1.1
Majority		299	23.7	
Turnout		1,258	27.0	−6.1
Liberal Democrats hold				

The by-election was called following the resignation of Cllr Hodson.
