= 1990 Southwark London Borough Council election =

1990 local election in England

- 3 May 1990

All 64 seats up for election to Southwark London Borough Council 33 seats needed for a majority
- Registered: 171,625
- Turnout: 69,572, 40.54%

	First party	Second party
Party	Labour	Liberal Democrats
Seats before	42	15
Seats won	37	21 (Note: Includes results from Lib Dem Focus Team candidates)
Seat change	▼5	▲5
Popular vote	30,902	16,688
Percentage	47.66%	25.74%
	Third party	Fourth party
Party	Conservative	Independent Labour Lion Team
Seats before	6	1
Seats won	6	0
Seat change	Steady	Steady
Popular vote	13,044	676
Percentage	20.12%	1.04%
Council control before election
Labour
Council control after election
Labour

Elections to Southwark Council were held in May 1990. The whole council was up for election. Turnout was 40.54%.

== Election result ==
Southwark local election result 1990
Party	Seats	Gains	Losses	Net gain/loss	Seats %	Votes %	Votes	+/−
Labour	37	1	6	▼5	57.81	47.66	30,902	▼3.02
Liberal Democrats	21	5	0	▲5	32.81	25.74	16,688	▼3.06
Conservative	6	1	1	Steady	9.38	20.12	13,044	▲2.06
Green	0	0	0	Steady	0.00	5.02	3,252	▲2.96
Independent Labour Lion Team	0	0	0	Steady	0.00	1.04	676	New
BNP	0	0	0	Steady	0.00	0.28	180	New
Communist	0	0	0	Steady	0.00	0.15	99	▼0.03
Total	64						64,841	

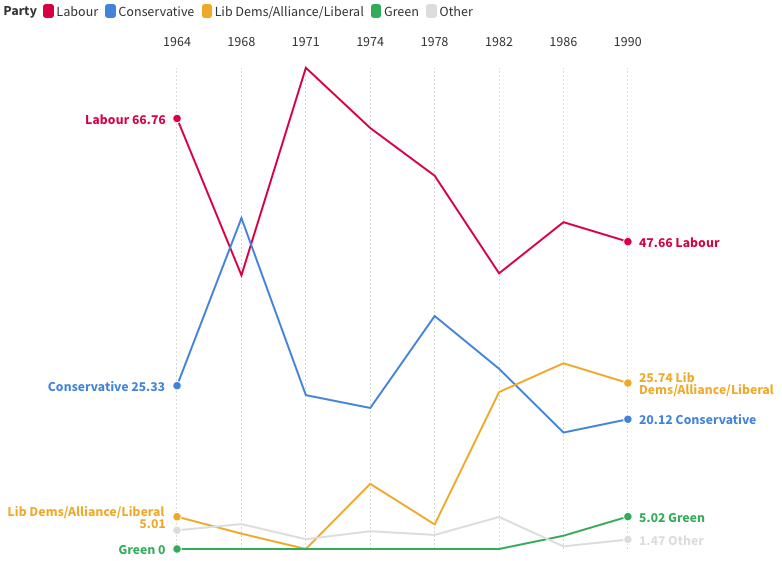
Southwark Council voting history

== Ward results ==
(*) - indicates an incumbent candidate

(†) - indicates an incumbent candidate standing in a different seat than which they were elected to

=== Abbey ===
Abbey (2)
Party	Candidate	Votes	%	±%
Liberal Democrats	Alan Blake* (Note: Blake was election in a by-election triggered by the resignation of Cllr. Kenneth Carlisle in 1988)	931	52.5	−0.9
Liberal Democrats	Steven Gauge	844	47.6	+8.5
Labour	Ellen Brown	687	38.7	−3.2
Labour	Rita Sergeant^{†} (Note: Sergeant was a sitting councillor representing the Chaucer ward)	636	35.9	−1.2
Conservative	Robert Berry	104	5.9	N/A
Conservative	Betina Bilham-Ware	93	5.2	N/A
Registered electors		4,835		
Turnout		1,779	36.79	
Rejected ballots		5	0.28	
Liberal Democrats hold				
Liberal Democrats gain from Labour				

=== Alleyn ===
Alleyn (2)
Party	Candidate	Votes	%	±%
Labour	Josephine Clark	1,209	50.3	+6.7
Labour	Cecile Lothian	1,140	47.4	+5.8
Conservative	Miranda Hardie	762	31.7	+3.0
Conservative	Percy Gray^{†}	755	31.4	+5.0
Green	Harriet Einsiedel	240	10.0	N/A
Liberal Democrats	Alistair Milne	204	8.5	−10.6
Liberal Democrats	Shirley Theiner	185	7.7	−10.5
Registered electors		5,607		
Turnout		2,409	42.96	
Rejected ballots		6	0.25	
Labour hold				
Labour hold				

=== Barset ===
Barset (2)
Party	Candidate	Votes	%	±%
Labour	Gary Halls	1,176	74.8	+16.4
Labour	Kenneth Morey	1,123	71.4	+18.6
Conservative	Charles Cooper	329	20.9	+10.5
Conservative	Peter Mason	325	20.7	+10.7
Registered electors		4,854		
Turnout		1,588	32.72	
Rejected ballots		15	0.94	
Labour hold				
Labour hold				

=== Bellenden ===
Bellenden (3)
Party	Candidate	Votes	%	±%
Labour	Bronwyn McKenna	2,107	60.7	+6.6
Labour	John McTernan*	2,042	58.8	+5.0
Labour	Margaret Russell	1,944	56.0	+4.8
Conservative	Marjorie Osborn	698	20.1	−2.6
Conservative	Victor Rutherford	648	18.7	−3.7
Green	Christopher Dodwell	601	17.3	+10.9
Conservative	Sharon Spiers	599	17.3	−4.8
Liberal Democrats	John Egan	318	9.2	−5.9
Liberal Democrats	Eileen Conn	285	8.2	−6.0
Registered electors		8,687		
Turnout		3,479	40.05	
Rejected ballots		8	0.23	
Labour hold				
Labour hold				
Labour hold				

=== Bricklayers ===
Bricklayers (2)
Party	Candidate	Votes	%	±%
Liberal Democrats	Graham Nash	1,671	61.3	+8.3
Liberal Democrats	Anne Scovell	1,602	58.8	+7.6
Labour	Lindsay Thomas	831	30.5	−9.8
Labour	Isaac Bellinfante	775	28.4	−9.8
Conservative	Miles Baxter	153	5.6	N/A
Conservative	Damian Cornell	134	4.9	N/A
Registered electors		6,087		
Turnout		2,730	44.85	
Rejected ballots		5	0.18	
Liberal Democrats hold				
Liberal Democrats hold				

=== Browning ===
Browning (3)
Party	Candidate	Votes	%	±%
Liberal Democrats	Paul Cheesman	1,521	53.8	+10.4
Liberal Democrats	Alex Goldie	1,485	52.5	+9.5
Liberal Democrats	Patricia Matheson^{†} (Note: Matheson was a sitting councillor representing the Dockyard ward)	1,464	51.8	+13.0
Labour	Harry Canagasabey	1,005	35.5	−10.2
Labour	Ronald North	1,002	35.4	−8.0
Labour	Winston Stafford^{†} (Note: Stafford was a sitting councillor representing the St Giles ward)	895	31.6	−11.2
Conservative	Helen Hall	172	6.1	−0.6
Conservative	Girish Pattni	145	5.1	−1.3
Conservative	Hui Man	142	5.0	N/A
Registered electors		7,490		
Turnout		2,834	37.84	
Rejected ballots		6	0.21	
Liberal Democrats gain from Labour				
Liberal Democrats gain from Labour				
Liberal Democrats hold				

=== Brunswick ===
Brunswick (3)
Party	Candidate	Votes	%	±%
Labour	Ian Driver	1,598	68.1	+10.7
Labour	John Maurice*	1,596	68.1	+11.1
Labour	Lilian Naish	1,595	68.0	+11.8
Conservative	Lilian Dawson	543	23.2	+10.8
Conservative	Douglas Mitchell	480	20.5	+9.3
Conservative	David Mason	475	20.3	+8.6
Communist	Eric Hodson	99	4.2	+1.1
Registered electors		7,374		
Turnout		2,362	32.03	
Rejected ballots		17	0.72	
Labour hold				
Labour hold				
Labour hold				

=== Burgess ===
Burgess (2)
Party	Candidate	Votes	%	±%
Liberal Democrats	Rose Colley*	1,011	57.6	+5.8
Liberal Democrats	Ronald Holt	944	53.8	+9.0
Labour	Piers Corbyn*	655	37.3	−8.5
Labour	Jay Hall	615	35.0	−5.4
Conservative	Sheila Mackey	59	3.4	N/A
Conservative	Stephen Mackey	52	3.0	N/A
Registered electors		4,339		
Turnout		1,755	40.56	
Rejected ballots		5	0.28	
Liberal Democrats hold				
Liberal Democrats gain from Labour				

=== Cathedral ===
Cathedral (2)
Party	Candidate	Votes	%	±%
Liberal Democrats	Hilary Wines*	1,353	60.5	+19.1
Liberal Democrats	Richard Shearman^{†} (Note: Shearman was a sitting councillor representing the Rotherhithe ward)	1,221	54.6	+15.7
Labour	Anne Worsley	682	30.5	−10.6
Labour	Shirley Reese	649	29.0	−11.4
Conservative	Harriette Blum	159	7.1	−3.5
Conservative	Mark Tunstill	156	7.0	N/A
Registered electors		5,415		
Turnout		2,250	41.55	
Rejected ballots		13	0.58	
Liberal Democrats hold				
Liberal Democrats gain from Labour				

=== Chaucer ===
Chaucer (3)
Party	Candidate	Votes	%	±%
Liberal Democrats	Anna McGettigan* (Note: McGettigan was elected in a by-election triggered by the resignation of Cllr. Linda Oram in 1988)	1,279	43.5	+2.3
Labour	John Johnson	1,263	42.9	−4.9
Labour	Sonya Murison	1,237	42.0	−4.3
Liberal Democrats	Leroy Arscott	1,195	40.6	−2.4
Labour	Bernard White	1,179	40.1	−5.2
Liberal Democrats	Robert Skelly	1,146	38.9	−0.8
Green	Richard Laming	251	8.5	N/A
Conservative	Maureen Jansen	177	6.0	−0.3
Conservative	James Gourlay	137	4.7	−1.0
Conservative	Jack Wolff	123	4.2	N/A
Registered electors		7,968		
Turnout		2,946	36.97	
Rejected ballots		3	0.10	
Liberal Democrats gain from Labour				
Labour hold				
Labour hold				

=== College ===
College (2)
Party	Candidate	Votes	%	±%
Conservative	Nicholas Eriksen	1,585	50.3	+2.7
Conservative	Heather Kirby	1,540	48.9	+3.7
Labour	Martin Chapman	1,128	35.8	+6.7
Labour	Gerda Glage	1,114	35.4	+7.5
Liberal Democrats	Patricia Mynott	399	12.7	−6.4
Liberal Democrats	Eileen Neale	372	11.8	−6.9
Registered electors		6,089		
Turnout		3,157	51.85	
Rejected ballots		6	0.19	
Conservative hold				
Conservative hold				

=== Consort ===
Consort (2)
Party	Candidate	Votes	%	±%
Labour	David Fryer^{†} (Note: Fryer was a sitting councillor representing the Browning ward)	1,254	69.1	+4.8
Labour	Sally Keeble*	1,253	69.1	+8.3
Conservative	Leslie Brown	429	23.6	+9.9
Conservative	Michael Bungy	387	21.3	+9.8
Registered electors		5,154		
Turnout		1,828	35.47	
Rejected ballots		14	0.77	
Labour hold				
Labour hold				

=== Dockyard ===
Dockyard (3)
Party	Candidate	Votes	%	±%
Liberal Democrats	David Buxton	1,807	46.8	+1.3
Liberal Democrats	Elizabeth Denton	1,772	45.9	+1.6
Liberal Democrats	Ronald Kendrick*	1,745	45.2	−0.7
Labour	Rebecca Corfield	1,290	33.4	−10.3
Labour	Simon McKeown	1,181	30.6	−10.9
Labour	Michael Geater^{†} (Note: Geater was a sitting councillor representing the St Giles ward)	1,170	30.3	−10.3
Conservative	Christopher Phillips	706	18.3	+11.9
Conservative	Thomas Owen	688	17.8	+11.5
Conservative	Andrew Raca	677	17.5	N/A
Registered electors		8,915		
Turnout		3,875	43.47	
Rejected ballots		11	0.28	
Liberal Democrats hold				
Liberal Democrats hold				
Liberal Democrats hold				

=== Faraday ===
Faraday (3)
Party	Candidate	Votes	%	±%
Labour	Alan Cotter	1,546	51.3	−13.6
Labour	Charles Cherrill	1,505	50.0	−14.5
Labour	John Lauder^{†} (Note: Lauder was a sitting councillor representing the Brunswick ward)	1,451	48.2	−15.3
Liberal Democrats	Martine Bonner	776	25.8	+11.1
Liberal Democrats	Linda Hall	762	25.3	+11.4
Liberal Democrats	Jonathan Hunt	711	23.6	+12.8
Conservative	Michael Roberts	367	12.2	−1.7
Conservative	David Sandford	361	12.0	−1.3
Conservative	Maureen Tomison	350	11.6	−0.8
Registered electors		9,363		
Turnout		3,015	32.20	
Rejected ballots		4	0.13	
Labour hold				
Labour hold				
Labour hold				

=== Friary ===
Friary (3)
Party	Candidate	Votes	%	±%
Labour	Eric Godfrey	1,128	49.4	−20.9
Labour	Robert Wingfield* (Note: Wingfield was elected in a by-election triggered by the resignation of Cllr. David Main in 1989)	1,021	44.7	−24.1
Labour	Marjorie Henriquez*	958	42.0	−27.9
Independent Labour Lion Team	Tony Goss*	766	33.6	−35.2
Independent Labour Lion Team	Ann Goss^{†} (Note: Goss was a sitting councillor representing the Browning ward)	704	30.8	N/A
Independent Labour Lion Team	Brian McKeon^{†} (Note: McKeon was a sitting councillor representing the Waverley ward)	558	24.4	N/A
Conservative	John Board	239	10.5	−3.3
Conservative	Angela Meakin	225	9.9	−2.7
Conservative	Roy Taylor	216	9.5	−2.0
Liberal Democrats	Mark Allen	139	6.1	−6.8
Liberal Democrats	Sandra Gray	126	5.5	−6.7
Liberal Democrats	Anne Sheehan	111	4.9	−6.5
Registered electors		6,413		
Turnout		2,297	35.8	
Rejected ballots		14		
Labour hold				
Labour hold				
Labour hold				

=== Liddle ===
Liddle (3)
Party	Candidate	Votes	%	±%
Labour	Mary Ellery*	1,246	81.9	+2.6
Labour	Daniel McCarthy*	1,079	70.9	−2.1
Labour	Deborah Welch* (Note: Welch was elected in a by-election triggered by the resignation of Cllr. Ali Balli in 1987)	1,028	67.6	−1.9
Conservative	Lawrence Kennedy	178	11.7	+4.3
Conservative	Richard Malyon	148	9.7	+3.2
Conservative	Kola Olushola	131	8.6	+3.3
Registered electors		8,487		
Turnout		1,537	18.11	
Rejected ballots		16	1.04	
Labour hold				
Labour hold				
Labour hold				

=== Lyndhurst ===
Lyndhurst (3)
Party	Candidate	Votes	%	±%
Labour	Aubyn Graham*	1,846	53.0	+1.9
Labour	Helen Shreeve	1,738	49.9	−2.4
Labour	Hassan Vahib	1,570	45.1	−6.7
Conservative	John Edwards^{†} (Note: Edwards was a sitting councillor representing the Ruskin ward)	1,074	30.8	+1.4
Conservative	Mark Marshall	975	28.0	−0.8
Conservative	Diana Ladas	969	27.8	−0.4
Green	Peter Reid	453	13.0	N/A
Liberal Democrats	Alison Farrow	349	10.0	−2.8
Liberal Democrats	Richard Newby	343	9.8	−2.9
Registered electors		8,780		
Turnout		3,488	39.73	
Rejected ballots		3	0.09	
Labour hold				
Labour hold				
Labour hold				

=== Newington ===
Newington (3)
Party	Candidate	Votes	%	±%
Labour	Mark Howarth*	2,016	58.2	−1.4
Labour	Jeremy Fraser*	1,996	57.6	−1.2
Labour	Roy Kennedy*	1,976	57.0	−3.1
Conservative	Clive Jones	601	17.3	+2.8
Conservative	Doris Pearce	558	16.1	+2.0
Conservative	Douglas Pearce	545	15.7	+3.9
Liberal Democrats	Neville Clemens	414	12.0	−2.6
Liberal Democrats	Gillian Clemens	395	11.4	−1.9
Green	Pauline Christopher	376	10.9	N/A
Liberal Democrats	Shirley Petrucci	306	8.8	−4.6
Registered electors		8,775		
Turnout		3,471	39.56	
Rejected ballots		7	0.20	
Labour hold				
Labour hold				
Labour hold				

=== Riverside ===
Riverside (3)
Party	Candidate	Votes	%	±%
Liberal Democrats	Elizabeth Cole	1,358	47.2	−7.1
Liberal Democrats	George Dunk*	1,299	45.2	−6.8
Liberal Democrats	Patricia Molloy	1,285	44.7	−6.0
Labour	Coral Newell* (Note: Coral was elected in a by-election triggered by the resignation of Cllr. Joan Price in 1988)	1,172	40.8	+4.6
Labour	Rupert Doyle	1,034	36.0	+0.4
Labour	Leonard Fisher	978	34.0	+1.0
Conservative	Richard Coultman	247	8.6	+2.2
Conservative	Anthony Powell	236	8.2	+4.6
Conservative	Nicola Meaden	206	7.2	N/A
Registered electors		6,747		
Turnout		2,879	42.67	
Rejected ballots		4	0.14	
Liberal Democrats hold				
Liberal Democrats hold				
Liberal Democrats hold				

=== Rotherhithe ===
Rotherhithe (3)
Party	Candidate	Votes	%	±%
Liberal Democrats	Frank Pemberton*	1,706	62.6	+6.6
Liberal Democrats	Victor Jones*	1,649	60.5	+10.9
Liberal Democrats	Jacqueline Bassom*	1,584	58.1	+11.1
Labour	John Burke	743	27.3	−9.6
Labour	David Brasier	736	27.0	−9.4
Labour	Alexander Coveney	448	16.4	−18.9
BNP	Stephen Tyler	180	6.6	N/A
Conservative	Pippa Holt	104	3.8	N/A
Conservative	Stephen Hill	95	3.5	N/A
Conservative	John van der Walt	88	3.2	N/A
Registered electors		5,900		
Turnout		2,731	46.29	
Rejected ballots		5	0.18	
Liberal Democrats hold				
Liberal Democrats hold				
Liberal Democrats hold				

=== Ruskin ===
Ruskin (3)
Party	Candidate	Votes	%	±%
Conservative	David Bradbury	1,900	43.0	−2.1
Conservative	Tobias Eckersley	1,894	42.9	−1.3
Conservative	Stephen Charge	1,890	42.8	−0.5
Labour	David Stephens	1,809	40.9	+13.6
Labour	Richard Exel	1,557	35.2	+8.4
Labour	Wycliffe Kempadoo	1,548	35.0	+10.6
Green	Priscilla Waugh	638	14.4	+4.9
Liberal Democrats	Bernard Webb	463	10.5	−11.1
Liberal Democrats	Benedict Rich	435	9.8	−10.8
Liberal Democrats	John Weedy	396	9.0	−10.5
Registered electors		7,659		
Turnout		4,426	57.79	
Rejected ballots		6	0.14	
Conservative hold				
Conservative hold				
Conservative hold				

=== Rye ===
Rye (2)
Party	Candidate	Votes	%	±%
Conservative	Irene Kimm*	1,447	43.6	+5.7
Labour	Christopher Hughes	1,425	43.0	+5.9
Labour	Peter Crome	1,401	42.2	+3.3
Conservative	Trevor Pitman* (Note: Pitman was elected in a by-election triggered by the resignation of Cllr. Elsie Headley in 1987)	1,361	41.0	+3.8
Green	Garth Robertson	282	8.5	+3.9
Liberal Democrats	Christine Watson	206	6.2	−8.2
Liberal Democrats	Hung Lee	179	5.4	−8.1
Registered electors		6,565		
Turnout		3,320	50.57	
Rejected ballots		4	0.12	
Conservative hold				
Labour hold				

=== St Giles ===
St Giles (3)
Party	Candidate	Votes	%	±%
Labour	John Roberts	1,765	61.2	+7.4
Labour	Anthony Ritchie*	1,699	58.9	+2.5
Labour	Michael Idun	1,627	56.4	+6.7
Conservative	James Lambert	497	17.2	+6.7
Conservative	Archibald Norman	473	16.4	+6.5
Conservative	Bruce Embleton	468	16.2	+6.9
Green	David Donaldson	411	14.3	+9.1
Liberal Democrats	Emma Hewett	327	11.3	−16.2
Liberal Democrats	Peter Duff	324	11.2	−14.0
Liberal Democrats	Helen Smith	322	11.2	−13.6
Registered electors		8,880		
Turnout		2,888	32.52	
Rejected ballots		5	0.17	
Labour hold				
Labour hold				
Labour hold				

=== The Lane ===
The Lane (2)
Party	Candidate	Votes	%	±%
Labour	Leslie Alden*	1,317	58.4	+11.7
Labour	Ann Bernadt	1,261	55.9	+10.3
Conservative	Malcolm Wilson	534	23.7	+8.0
Conservative	Peter Conkey	532	23.6	+8.4
Liberal Democrats	Philip Bonnington	290	12.9	−14.5
Liberal Democrats	Thomas Webster	262	11.6	−15.8
Registered electors		5,729		
Turnout		2,262	39.48	
Rejected ballots		6	0.26	
Labour hold				
Labour hold				

=== Waverley ===
Waverley (2)
Party	Candidate	Votes	%	±%
Labour	Michael Gibson	1,313	49.7	−6.0
Labour	Pamela Smith^{†} (Note: Smith was a sitting councillor representing The Lane)	1,273	48.2	−1.3
Liberal Democrats	Celia Cooke	779	29.5	N/A
Liberal Democrats	Kevin Daws	752	28.5	N/A
Conservative	David Harvey	466	17.7	−12.4
Conservative	Peter Withrington	424	16.1	−12.7
Registered electors		5,513		
Turnout		2,643	47.94	
Rejected ballots		3	0.11	
Labour hold				
Labour hold				

== By-Elections ==
Brunswick by-election, 25 July 1991
Party	Candidate	Votes	%	±%
Liberal Democrats	Vivien Maurice	1,076	50.8	N/A
Labour	Bernard White	775	36.6	−21.5
Conservative	Michael Bungy	135	6.4	−16.8
BNP	Stephen Tyler	132	6.2	N/A
Registered electors		7,645		
Total votes		2,118	27.7	
Turnout			27.8	
Liberal Democrats gain from Labour				

The by-election was called following the death of Cllr Maurice.
