= Rotherhithe (ward) =

- Electoral ward for the Southwark London Borough Council
- Rotherhithe ward boundaries since 2018
- Borough: Southwark
- County: Greater London
- Population: 15,626 (2021)
- Electorate: 10,771 (2022)
- Major settlements: Rotherhithe
- Area: 1.286 square kilometres (0.497 sq mi)

Current electoral ward
- Created: 1965
- Number of members: 1965–1968: 3; 1968–1978: 2; 1978–present: 3
- Councillors: Colin Boyle; Stephanie Cryan; Kath Whittam
- GSS code: E05000549 (2002–2018); E05011112 (2018–present)

Rotherhithe is an electoral ward in the London Borough of Southwark. The ward has existed since the creation of the borough on 1 April 1965 and was first used in the 1964 elections.

== Councillors ==
Election	Councillors		
2002	Jeffrey Hook (Liberal Democrats)	Anne Yates (Liberal Democrats)	Columba Blango (Liberal Democrats)
2006	Jeffrey Hook (Liberal Democrats)	Anne Yates (Liberal Democrats)	Columba Blango (Liberal Democrats)
2010	Jeffrey Hook (Liberal Democrats)	Wilma Nelson (Liberal Democrats)	Columba Blango (Liberal Democrats)
2014	Bill Williams (Labour Party)	Stephanie Cryan (Labour Party)	Kath Whittam (Green Party) (Note: Was elected as a Labour Party Councillor in 2018 and 2022, but was elected as a Green Party Councillor in 2026.)
2018	Bill Williams (Labour Party)	Stephanie Cryan (Labour Party)	Kath Whittam (Green Party)
2022	Bethan Roberts (Labour Party)	Stephanie Cryan (Labour Party)	Kath Whittam (Green Party)
2026	Colin Boyle (Green Party)	Stephanie Cryan (Labour Party)	Kath Whittam (Green Party)

== Southwark council elections since 2018 ==
There was a revision of ward boundaries in Southwark in 2018.

=== 2026 election ===
The election took place on 7 May 2026.

2026 Southwark London Borough Council election: Rotherhithe (3)
Party	Candidate	Votes	%	±%
Green	Colin Boyle	1,345	30.8	+16
Labour	Stephanie Cryan	1,317	30.2	−22.8
Green	Kath Whittam	1,151	28.7	−17.6
Green	Aadi Venkatesh	1,179	27.0	new
Labour	Bethan Roberts	1104	25.3	−23.9
Labour	Tom Murray	1101	25.2	new
Liberal Democrats	Vikas Aggarwal	956	21.9	new
Liberal Democrats	JK Doran	908	20.8	new
Liberal Democrats	Sorcha Ní Chonghaile	848	19.4	new
Reform	Tatania Hernandez	570	13.1	new
Reform	Andy Kekwik	568	13.0	new
Reform	Robert Ferguson	318	12.4	new
Independent	Barry Duckett	315	7.2	new
Conservative	James Hatt	229	5.3	new
Conservative	Aditya Chathli	211	4.8	new
Conservative	Christopher Mottau	206	4.7	new
Turnout		4,361	39.49	+8.7
Green hold		Swing	+16	
Labour hold		Swing	-22.8	
Green hold		Swing	-17.6	

=== 2022 election ===
The election took place on 5 May 2022.

2022 Southwark London Borough Council election: Rotherhithe (3)
Party	Candidate	Votes	%	±%
Labour	Stephanie Cryan	1,782	53.0	+2.8
Labour	Bethan Roberts	1,653	49.2	+5.5
Labour	Kath Whittam	1,558	46.3	+1.0
Liberal Democrats	Paul Bowers	788	23.4	−9.8
Liberal Democrats	Jit Lim	695	20.7	−8.7
Liberal Democrats	Mark Platt	600	17.8	−11.1
Green	Colin Boyle	498	14.8	+3.4
Green	Susan Cooke	485	14.4	N/A
Green	Roger Manser	421	12.5	+0.8
Conservative	Laura Collins	381	11.3	+0.2
Conservative	Michael Tobin	322	9.6	−0.4
Conservative	Robert Ferguson	318	9.5	−0.2
TUSC	Robert Law	102	3.0	N/A
SDP	Andy Kekwick	57	1.7	N/A
Turnout		3,363	31.22	−0.77
Labour hold		Swing		
Labour hold		Swing		
Labour hold		Swing		

=== 2018 election ===
The election took place on 3 May 2018.

2018 Southwark London Borough Council election: Rotherhithe (3)
Party	Candidate	Votes	%	±%
Labour Co-op	Stephanie Cryan	1,726	50.2	
Labour Co-op	Kath Whittam	1,558	45.3	
Labour Co-op	Bill Williams	1,504	43.7	
Liberal Democrats	Tom Holder	1,142	33.2	
Liberal Democrats	Mel Gordon	1,013	29.4	
Liberal Democrats	Wendy Nowak	994	28.9	
Green	Colin Boyle	517	15.0	
Green	Roger Manser	404	11.7	
Conservative	Kirsten Lindsay	381	11.1	
Conservative	Edward Burton	345	10.0	
Conservative	William Robinson	334	9.7	
Majority				
Turnout		3,440	31.99	
Labour Co-op win (new boundaries)				
Labour Co-op win (new boundaries)				
Labour Co-op win (new boundaries)				

== 2002–2018 Southwark council elections ==
Rotherhithe ward boundaries from 2002 to 2018

There was a revision of ward boundaries in Southwark in 2002.

=== 2014 election ===
The election took place on 22 May 2014.

2014 Southwark London Borough Council election: Rotherhithe (3)
Party	Candidate	Votes	%	±%
Labour	Stephanie Cryan	1,370	40.0	+10.4
Labour	Kath Whittam	1,348	39.4	+10.8
Labour	Bill Williams	1,244	36.4	+11.3
Liberal Democrats	James Fearnley	934	27.3	−6.6
Liberal Democrats	Wilma Nelson	921	26.9	−9.2
Liberal Democrats	Jeffrey Hook	860	25.1	−11.5
UKIP	Ian Pheby	761	22.2	N/A
UKIP	Pat Lago	660	19.3	N/A
Green	Emily Haves	497	14.5	+4.4
Conservative	Eren Ezel	377	11.0	−7.3
Conservative	Pauline Boyle	357	10.4	−7.2
Conservative	Sam Packer	302	8.8	−8.6
TUSC	Mark Chaffey	88	2.6	N/A
Turnout		3,488	34.4	−19.0
Labour gain from Liberal Democrats		Swing		
Labour gain from Liberal Democrats		Swing		
Labour gain from Liberal Democrats		Swing		

=== 2010 election ===
The election on 6 May 2010 took place on the same day as the United Kingdom general election.

2010 Southwark London Borough Council election: Rotherhithe (3)
Party	Candidate	Votes	%	±%
Liberal Democrats	Jeffrey Hook	1,719	36.6	−10.1
Liberal Democrats	Wilma Nelson	1,695	36.1	−11.9
Liberal Democrats	Columba Blango	1,590	33.9	−10.0
Labour	Christopher Brown	1,389	29.6	+4.1
Labour	Kath Whittam	1,343	28.6	+3.4
Labour	Anthony Squires	1,180	25.1	+3.3
Conservative	Simon Hodge	861	18.3	+1.2
Conservative	Percy Gray	825	17.6	+2.1
Conservative	Matt Hinxman	815	17.4	+2.2
Green	Zoe Young	504	10.1	−0.1
Independent	Kathy Hennessy	467	9.9	N/A
Independent	Jerry Hewitt	414	8.8	N/A
Independent	Patrick Horan	299	6.4	N/A
Turnout		4,695	53.4	+25.2
Liberal Democrats hold		Swing		
Liberal Democrats hold		Swing		
Liberal Democrats hold		Swing		

=== 2008 by-election ===
The by-election took place on 9 October 2008, following the death of Anne Yates.

2008 Rotherhithe by-election
Party	Candidate	Votes	%	±%
Liberal Democrats	Wilma Nelson	1,149	56.8	+8.8
Labour	Kath Whittam	618	30.6	+5.1
Conservative	Loanna Morrison	255	12.6	−4.5
Majority		531	26.2	+7.8
Turnout		2,022	23.8	−4.4
Liberal Democrats hold		Swing		

=== 2006 election ===
The election took place on 4 May 2006.

2006 Southwark London Borough Council election: Rotherhithe (3)
Party	Candidate	Votes	%	±%
Liberal Democrats	Anne Yates	1,134	48.0	−12.0
Liberal Democrats	Jeffrey Hook	1,102	46.7	−13.4
Liberal Democrats	Columba Blango	1,036	43.9	−12.6
Labour	Edward Colley	601	25.5	+2.7
Labour	Victoria Fewkes	596	25.2	+2.6
Labour	Frank Pemberton	514	21.8	+1.4
Conservative	Melissa Bean	403	17.1	+8.4
Conservative	Frances Gray	367	15.5	+7.8
Conservative	Matthew Kirk	359	15.2	+7.7
Green	Brendan Connolly	242	10.2	+2.0
Green	Ruvini De Alwis	233	9.9	+4.1
Green	Stephanie Ferron	222	9.4	+4.0
Turnout		2,394	28.2	+5.0
Liberal Democrats hold		Swing		
Liberal Democrats hold		Swing		
Liberal Democrats hold		Swing		

=== 2002 election ===
The election took place on 2 May 2002.

2002 Southwark London Borough Council election: Rotherhithe (3)
Party	Candidate	Votes	%	±%
Liberal Democrats	Jeffrey Hook	1,130	60.1	
Liberal Democrats	Anne Yates	1,128	60.0	
Liberal Democrats	Columba Blango	1,063	56.5	
Labour	John Hellings	428	22.8	
Labour	Olufemi Abe	426	22.6	
Labour	Gordon Jones	384	20.4	
Conservative	Simon Ainsworth	164	8.7	
Conservative	Michael Ramsey	163	8.7	
Green	Gillian Addison	154	8.2	
Conservative	Jasmine Cullingford	141	7.5	
Green	Tyron Evelyn	110	5.8	
Green	June Veitch	102	5.4	
Turnout		1,889	23.2	
Liberal Democrats win (new boundaries)				
Liberal Democrats win (new boundaries)				
Liberal Democrats win (new boundaries)				

== 1978–2002 Southwark council elections ==
Rotherhithe ward boundaries from 1978 to 2002

There was a revision of ward boundaries in Southwark in 1978. The number of councillors returned from Rotherhithe was increased from two to three.

=== 1998 by-election ===
The by-election took place on 3 December 1998, following the death of Victor Jones.

1998 Rotherhithe by-election
Party	Candidate	Votes	%	±%
Liberal Democrats	Jeffrey Hook	1,143	55.7	+2.4
Labour	Peter John	813	39.6	+5.9
National Democrats	Gary Cartwright	56	2.7	N/A
Conservative	Steven Bolton	28	1.4	−4.2
Green	Storm Poorun	11	0.5	N/A
Majority		330	16.1	
Turnout		2,051	32.0	+1.7
Liberal Democrats hold		Swing		

=== 1998 election ===
The election on 7 May 1998 took place on the same day as the 1998 Greater London Authority referendum.

1998 Southwark London Borough Council election: Rotherhithe (3)
Party	Candidate	Votes	%	±%
Liberal Democrats	Beverley Bassom	1,063	60.18	▼7.21
Liberal Democrats	Victor Jones	1,037		
Liberal Democrats	Niko Baar	972		
Labour	Neil Fell	656	34.59	▲12.93
Labour	Robert Gasson	655		
Labour Co-op	Francis Treml	455		
Conservative	Nathan Chart	108	5.23	▲1.57
Conservative	John McConnell	93		
Conservative	Jon van der Walt	66		
Registered electors		6,455		▲347
Turnout		1,956	30.30	▼9.75
Rejected ballots		11	0.56	▲0.03
Liberal Democrats hold		Swing		
Liberal Democrats hold		Swing		
Liberal Democrats hold		Swing		

=== 1994 election ===
The election took place on 5 May 1994.

1994 Southwark London Borough Council election: Rotherhithe (3)
Party	Candidate	Votes	%	±%
Liberal Democrats	Frank Pemberton	1,537	67.39	▲3.19
Liberal Democrats	Victor Jones	1,480		
Liberal Democrats	Jacqueline Bassom	1,454		
Labour	David Brasier	536	21.66	▼3.38
Labour	William Griffiths	497		
Labour	Carl Upsall	403		
Militant Labour	Joan Francis	168	7.28	New
Militant Labour	Lynn Kelly	159		
Militant Labour	Julie Donovan	155		
Conservative	Joyce Coomber	88	3.66	▼0.08
Conservative	Frances Gray	84		
Conservative	Sarah Phillips	70		
Registered electors		6,108		▲208
Turnout		2,446	40.05	▼6.24
Rejected ballots		13	0.53	▲0.35
Liberal Democrats hold		Swing		
Liberal Democrats hold		Swing		
Liberal Democrats hold		Swing		

=== 1990 election ===
The election took place on 3 May 1990.

1990 Southwark London Borough Council election: Rotherhithe (3)
Party	Candidate	Votes	%	±%
Liberal Democrats	Frank Pemberton	1,706	64.20	
Liberal Democrats	Victor Jones	1,649		
Liberal Democrats	Jacqueline Bassom	1,584		
Labour	John Burke	743	25.04	
Labour	David Brasier	736		
Labour	Alexander Coveney	448		
BNP	Stephen Tyler	180	7.02	
Conservative	Pippa Holt	104	3.74	
Conservative	Stephen Hill	95		
Conservative	John van der Walt	88		
Registered electors		5,900		
Turnout		2,731	46.29	
Rejected ballots		5	0.18	
Liberal Democrats hold		Swing		
Liberal Democrats hold		Swing		
Liberal Democrats hold		Swing		

=== 1986 election ===
The election took place on 8 May 1986.

1986 Southwark London Borough Council election: Rotherhithe (3)
Party	Candidate	Votes	%	±%
Alliance (Liberal)	Frank Pemberton	1,526	56.0	+29.3
Alliance (Liberal)	Victor Jones	1,353	49.6	+22.9
Alliance (Liberal)	Richard Shearman	1,283	47.0	+24.0
Labour	William Carter	1,006	36.9	−9.7
Labour	David Brasier	992	36.4	−9.1
Labour	William Griffiths	963	35.3	−9.4
National Front	Raymond Barker	77	2.8	N/A
National Front	Anthony Grant	76	2.8	N/A
Turnout		2,727	44.4	+14.1
Alliance hold		Swing		
Alliance gain from Labour		Swing		
Alliance gain from Labour		Swing		

=== 1984 by-election ===
The by-election took place on 13 September 1984, following the resignation of Harold Young.

1984 Rotherhithe by-election
Party	Candidate	Votes	%	±%
Alliance (Liberal)	Frank Pemberton	1,381	60.9	+34.2
Labour	Trevor Lawrence	780	34.4	−12.2
Conservative	Percy Gray	55	2.4	−14.8
National Front	Peter Core	50	2.2	N/A
Turnout			35.2	+4.9
Alliance gain from Labour		Swing		

=== 1982 election ===
The election took place on 6 May 1982.

1982 Southwark London Borough Council election: Rotherhithe (3)
Party	Candidate	Votes	%	±%
Labour	Harold Young	909	46.6	−21.3
Labour	David Brasier	887	45.5	−24.9
Labour	Alexander Coveney	872	44.7	−24.2
Alliance (Liberal)	Carol Sawyer	521	26.7	N/A
Alliance (Liberal)	Thomas Taylor	521	26.7	N/A
Alliance (SDP)	Raymond Dutton	448	23.0	N/A
Conservative	David Bellamy	336	17.2	−4.6
Conservative	Michael Pike	301	15.4	−3.1
Conservative	Alison Pike	292	15.0	−3.3
Communist	Robert Gordon	50	2.6	N/A
Turnout		1,949	30.3	+5.6
Labour hold		Swing		
Labour hold		Swing		
Labour hold		Swing		

=== 1978 election ===
The election took place on 4 May 1978.

1978 Southwark London Borough Council election: Rotherhithe (3)
Party	Candidate	Votes	%	±%
Labour	Edward Rowe	1,206	70.4	
Labour	Charles Sawyer	1,181	68.9	
Labour	Harold Young	1,163	67.9	
Conservative	Lorna Dowling	373	21.8	
Conservative	Robert Dunn	317	18.5	
Conservative	Geoffrey Johnson	313	18.3	
Turnout		1,714	24.7	
Labour win (new seat)				
Labour win (new seat)				
Labour win (new seat)				

== 1968–1978 Southwark council elections ==
There was a revision of ward boundaries in Southwark in 1968. The number of councillors returned from Rotherhithe was reduced from three to two.

=== 1974 election ===
The election took place on 2 May 1974.

1974 Southwark London Borough Council election: Rotherhithe (2)
Party	Candidate	Votes	%	±%
Labour	Edward Rowe	1,317	89.3	▼0.9
Labour	Harold Young	1,196	81.1	▼4.6
Conservative	B. Thurnell	128	8.7	▼0.6
Turnout		1,475	21.8	−6.7
Labour hold		Swing		
Labour hold		Swing		

=== 1971 election ===
The election took place on 13 May 1971.

1971 Southwark London Borough Council election: Rotherhithe (2)
Party	Candidate	Votes	%	±%
Labour	Edward Rowe	1,843	90.2	
Labour	Harold Young	1,750	85.7	
Conservative	B. Thurnell	189	9.3	
Turnout		2,043	28.5	
Labour hold		Swing		
Labour hold		Swing		

=== 1968 election ===
The election took place on 9 May 1968.

1968 Southwark London Borough Council election: Rotherhithe (2)
Party	Candidate	Votes	%	±%
Labour	William Ellis	891	70.1	
Labour	Harold Young	862	67.8	
Conservative	I. Arrowsmith	342	26.9	
Conservative	G. Colbran	339	26.7	
Turnout		1,271	19.0	
Labour win (new boundaries)				
Labour win (new boundaries)				

== 1964–1968 Southwark council elections ==
External image
- Map showing Rotherhithe ward boundaries from 1965 to 1968

=== 1964 election ===
The election took place on 7 May 1964.

1964 Southwark London Borough Council election: Rotherhithe (3)
Party	Candidate	Votes	%	±%
Labour	William Ellis	1,450	89.8	
Labour	Edward Rowe	1,419	87.9	
Labour	F. Creswick	1,400	86.7	
Conservative	C. Hayward	176	10.9	
Conservative	T. Judd	143	8.9	
Conservative	F. Morgan	126	7.8	
Turnout		1,615	18.5	
Labour win (new seat)				
Labour win (new seat)				
Labour win (new seat)				
