= Christine Payne =

Brief biography and summary of career

Christine Grace Payne MBE (born 30 December 1956) is a British former trade union leader.

Payne graduated from Loughborough University and studied industrial relations at Middlesex Polytechnic. In 1979, she began working for the trade union Equity, becoming the television commercials organiser in 1981. She served as Assistant Secretary (Recorded Performance) between 1991 and 1999, when she became Assistant General Secretary (Live Performance).

In 2005 Payne was elected as the union's General Secretary, becoming the first woman to lead the union.

Under Payne's leadership, membership of Equity grew from just over 35,000 in 2005, to just under 49,000 in 2020. She served on the executive committee of the International Federation of Actors, and the General Council of the Trades Union Congress.

Payne was re-elected unopposed as general secretary in 2010 and 2015, retiring in 2020.

She was appointed Member of the Order of the British Empire (MBE) in the 2023 Birthday Honours for services to the trade union movement.

Trade union offices
Preceded by Ian McGarry	General Secretary of Equity; 2005–2020	Succeeded by Paul W. Fleming
