= Lundagård (newspaper) =

Lund University student newspaper

- "Sveriges äldsta studenttidning — på nätet sedan 1995"
- Type: College newspaper
- School: Lund University
- Owner(s): Lund University Student Union (L.U.S.)
- Founded: 1920; 105 years ago
- Headquarters: Lund, Sweden
- Website: lundagard.se

Lundagård is a student newspaper published by the Lund University Student Unions (LUS). Lundagård was first published in 1920 and is the oldest student newspaper still in circulation in Sweden. It is published 10 times a year.

The newspaper publishes in Swedish, but in 2011 added an online-only English section with original articles, aimed at the large international student population in Lund.

Among previous editors-in-chief we find well-known Swedes such as Hjalmar Gullberg, Ivar Harrie, Torgny T:son Segerstedt, Gunnar Fredriksson, Hasse Alfredson, Per Gahrton, Per Lysander, Per T. Ohlsson, Rolf Rembe and P.M. Nilsson.
