= Antony Zacaroli =

British judge

The Right Honourable Lord Justice Zacaroli
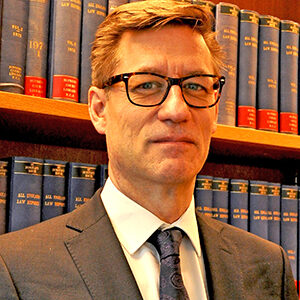
- Zacaroli in 2022

Lord Justice of Appeal
- Incumbent
- Assumed office 1 October 2024
- Monarch: Charles III

Justice of the High Court
- In office 13 November 2017 – 12 June 2024
- Monarchs: Elizabeth II; Charles III

Personal details
- Born: 10 May 1958 (age 68) Sutton Coldfield
- Education: Pembroke College, Oxford

Sir Antony James Zacaroli, styled Lord Justice Zacaroli, (born 10 May 1958) is a British Lord Justice of Appeal.

== Early life and education ==
Zacaroli was born in Sutton Coldfield and attended the local comprehensive school, Bishop Walsh Academy.

He went on to study law at Pembroke College, Oxford, graduating in 1982. He was a tutor at Pembroke from 1987 to 1991. In 2018, Zacaroli was elected as an honorary fellow of Pembroke College, Oxford, where he leads seminars for law students.

== Career ==
Zacaroli was called to the Bar by Middle Temple in 1987. After completing his pupillage he practised at a chancery chambers in Middle Temple.

He later moved to South Square Chambers in 1990 until his appointment as a judge in 2017. During his tenancy, he specialised in insolvency, banking and commercial law.

Whilst practising at the Bar, Zacaroli was a member of a number of committees. He served on the Management Committee of the Bar Pro Bono Unit since 2001, the Insolvency Rules Committee from 2012 and from 2015, the Financial Markets Law Committee.

He was appointed Queen's Counsel in 2006.

On 16 July 2013, Zacaroli was appointed an Bencher of Middle Temple.

Zacaroli was appointed a High Court judge on 13 November 2017 and assigned to the Chancery division by the Lord Chief Justice He later received his customary knighthood from Elizabeth II on 6 December 2018.

Zacaroli was appointed a Judge of the Court of Appeal of England and Wales on 1 October 2024.
