= Gerald Croasdell =

British trade unionist (1916–1998)

Gerald Bright Croasdell OBE (12 July 1916 – 15 July 1998) was a British trade union leader.

Croasdell grew up in Hampstead, and then studied law at Pembroke College, Cambridge. He was President of the Cambridge Union in Lent term 1937, and was also a member of the Cambridge Apostles. After graduation, he ran the youth section of the League of Nations Union, and campaigned on behalf of the Republican side in the Spanish Civil War.

During World War II, Croasdell served as a tank commander, then as an Army officer on board a ship in the Far East. At the end of the war, he was made an Officer of the Order of the British Empire. He spent time as a lawyer in private practice, but in 1950 became the legal officer of Equity. He was soon also appointed the union's deputy general secretary, then, when in 1958 its general secretary died, he was elected to the post.

While Croasdell privately supported Marxism, as leader of the union he focused on taking a non-partisan role in negotiations. In 1974, he moved to become general secretary of the International Federation of Actors, retiring in 1983.

Trade union offices
Preceded by Gordon Sandison	General Secretary of Equity; 1958–1974	Succeeded by Peter Plouviez
Preceded by Rolf Rembe	General Secretary of the International Federation of Actors; 1974–1983	Succeeded by Rolf Rembe
