= Paul W. Fleming =

British trade union leader (born 1988)

Paul W Fleming
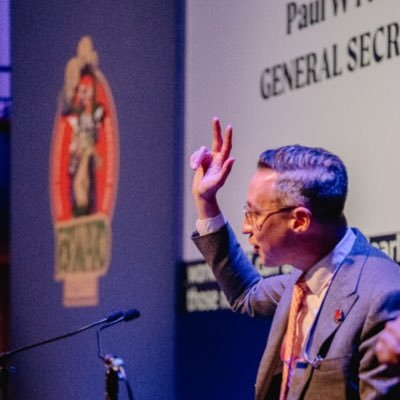
- Fleming at Equity Conference 2024

General Secretary of Equity (British trade union)
- In office October 2020 – Incumbent
- Preceded by: Christine Payne

Personal details
- Born: 13 May 1988 (age 38) Birmingham, England
- Party: Labour
- Education: Mansfield College, Oxford

Paul William Fleming (born 13 May 1988) is a British trade union leader. He has served as the General Secretary of Equity since 2020.

== Early life ==
Born in Birmingham, West Midlands, Fleming was educated at Bishop Walsh Catholic School. The first member of his family to attend university, Fleming studied Philosophy, Politics, and Economics at Mansfield College, Oxford. Whilst a student, he was President of The Newman Society, and Secretary of the Junior Common Room at Mansfield College.

After graduation, he worked as for the New Jersey Democratic Party, becoming the Acting Press Secretary, before becoming an organiser for the Community trade union.

== Career at Equity ==
He started working for Equity in 2011, and by the end of the decade was the union's West End Organiser.

In July 2020, Fleming was elected as General Secretary of Equity, winning 69% of the vote on a 16% turnout. On his election, he was described as "the first LGBTQ+ General Secretary of a major UK trade union".

During his tenure as General Secretary membership of Equity rose to the record level of 50,000 members.

In May 2025, Fleming stood for a second term and was opposed by stuntman Riky Ash. He was re-elected, winning 81% of the vote on a 12.5% turnout.

== Personal life and politics ==
In 2014, Fleming was elected to the Council of the London Borough of Southwark in Faraday ward, for the Labour Party, serving two terms. Fleming was the only Labour councillor in Southwark to support the election of Jeremy Corbyn as leader of the Labour Party in 2015.

Fleming resigned the Labour whip in 2020, following his election as General Secretary, due to the union's non-affiliation from the Labour Party.

Trade union offices
Preceded by Christine Payne	General Secretary of Equity; 2020–present	Succeeded by Incumbent
