= Jean Darcante =

French actor and theatre director (1910–1990)

- Born: Jean-Louis Albassier; 1 April 1910; Paris
- Died: 18 March 1990 (aged 79); Paris
- Occupation(s): Actor, theatre director, theatre manager

Jean Darcante, real name Jean-Louis Albassier, (1 April 1910 – 18 March 1990) was a French actor and theatre director. He was managing director of the théâtre de la Renaissance in Paris from 1946 to 1957.

== Filmography ==
=== Actor ===
- 1936: Girls of Paris (by Claude Vermorel) – Roland
- 1939: L'Étrange nuit de Noël (by Yvan Noé) – Roger
- 1942: La Symphonie fantastique (by Christian-Jaque) – Prosper Mérimée (uncredited)
- 1942: Le Destin fabuleux de Désirée Clary (by Sacha Guitry) – Duphot
- 1946: Vive la liberté (by Jeff Musso)
- 1946: Martin Roumagnac (by Georges Lacombe) – L'avocat de la défense
- 1953: Flukt fra paradiset (by Toralf Sandø) – Trekkspilleren
- 1959: Two Men in Manhattan (by Jean-Pierre Melville) – Rouvier (final film role)

=== Dubbing ===
- 1940: Jud Süß – Aktuarius Faber (Malte Jäger)

== Theatre ==
Comedian

- 1934: Les Races by Ferdinand Bruckner, mise en scène Raymond Rouleau, Théâtre de l'Œuvre
- 1943: Cristobal by Charles Exbrayat, mise en scène Jean Darcante, Théâtre Montparnasse
- 1961: Le Misanthrope de Molière, mise en scène Jean Meyer, Théâtre du Palais-Royal

Theatre director

- 1943: Cristobal by Charles Exbrayat, Théâtre Montparnasse
- 1944: Un Don Juan by Michel Aucouturier, Comédie des Champs-Élysées
- 1946: Quatre Femmes by Marcel Mouloudji, théâtre de la Renaissance
- 1946: L'Herbe d'erreur after Rémy Bordez, adaptation Jean Variot, mise en scène Jean Darcante, théâtre de la Renaissance
- 1950: Ce soir à Samarcande by Jacques Deval, théâtre de la Renaissance
- 1952: Madame Filoumé by Eduardo De Filippo, théâtre de la Renaissance
- 1954: Rope by Patrick Hamilton, adaptation Gabriel Arout, théâtre de la Renaissance
- 1954: Il pleut bergère by René Wheeler, théâtre de la Renaissance
- 1954: Bel-Ami by Frédéric Dard after Guy de Maupassant, théâtre de la Renaissance
- 1955: Monsieur chasse de Georges Feydeau, mise en scène Jean Darcante, théâtre de la Renaissance

== Bibliography ==
- Jean Darcante, À l'enseigne d'un Dieu malin, Michel Brient éditeur, Paris, 1959.
- Jean Darcante, Théâtre, la grande aventure, éditions du Sorbier, 1985.

Trade union offices
Preceded by New position	President of the International Federation of Actors; 1952–1956	Succeeded by Gordon Sandison
