= Rolf Rembe =

Swedish trade unionist and theatre director (1926–2022)

Rolf Douglas Rembe (7 March 1926 - 20 February 2022) was a Swedish trade unionist and theatre director.

Born in Sövde, Rembe studied at the University of Lund, training as a school teacher. While at the university, he became president of Studentafton, and also edited the student newspaper, Lundagård. On graduating, he began working as a journalist, then spent a year serving on the commission supervising the Korean War armistice.

In 1956, Rembe became the first full-time general secretary of the Swedish Theatre Union. In 1963, he led a successful 111-day strike of actors at Sveriges Television. In 1968, he additionally became general secretary of the International Federation of Actors (FIA). By 1968, the federation felt it needed a full-time leader, but he was unwilling to give up his position at the Swedish union, so left the FIA post.

In 1977, Rembe became director of the Malmö City Theatre, then in 1980 went to lead the cultural department of the Nordic Council of Ministers. In 1983, he moved to London to return to the general secretaryship of the FIA. He retired in 1991, returning to Sweden the following year.

Trade union offices
Preceded by Pierre Chesnais	General Secretary of the International Federation of Actors; 1963–1974	Succeeded by Gerald Croasdell
Preceded by Gerald Croasdell	General Secretary of the International Federation of Actors; 1983–1991	Succeeded by Michael Crosby
