= Llewellyn Rees =

English actor (1901–1994)

- 1939 Spotlight photo by Pollard Crowther
- Born: Walter Llewellyn Rees; 18 June 1901; Charmouth, Dorset, England
- Died: 7 January 1994 (aged 92); Barnes, London, England
- Education: Royal Academy of Dramatic Art
- Occupation: actor
- Spouse(s): Caroline Hahn (m. 1928; ann. 1930) Madeleine Newbury (m. 1961)

Walter Llewellyn Rees (18 June 1901 – 7 January 1994) was an English actor.

== Career ==
His television roles included appearances on Doctor Who (in the serial The Deadly Assassin (1976) playing the assassinated Time Lord President), The Brothers, Inspector Morse, Doomwatch and Coronation Street. He appeared in a number of films such as The Dresser, Withnail and I, A Fish Called Wanda and Splitting Heirs.

In The Dresser, Rees played an ageing member of a British touring company. The play that the film was based on had its genesis in the touring company of actor/manager Sir Donald Wolfit, whom Rees had toured with in the 1940 and 1950s. He played a guest role in ATV soap opera Crossroads in 1978 as Godfrey King.

Rees was also active in the political end of the theatre serving as General Secretary, Actors' Equity Association 1940–46; Secretary, Federation of Theatre Unions 1944–46; Governor, The Old Vic 1945–47; Drama Director, Arts Council of Great Britain 1947–49; Administrator, Old Vic 1949–51; Administrator, Arts Theatre 1951–52.

== Personal life ==
When he was 60 years old, Rees married actress Madeleine Newbury.

== Death ==
He died on 7 January 1994, at the age of 92.

== Filmography ==
Year	Title	Role	Notes
1956	Private's Progress	2nd Art Expert	Uncredited
1956	You Can't Escape	Coroner	Uncredited
1957	Brothers in Law	Farrant QC	
1958	Cat & Mouse	Bank Manager	Uncredited
1959	The Navy Lark	Adm. Troutbridge	
1959	Strictly Confidential	Mellinger	
1960	The Price of Silence	H.G. Shipley	
1960	The House in Marsh Road	P.J. Webster	
1963	The Double	Bradshaw	
1968	Salt and Pepper	'Fake' Prime Minister	
1970	Cromwell	The Speaker	
1972	Crown Court	Doctor	
1972	The Ruling Class	Lord	
1974	Dead Cert	Chemist	
1978	Carry On Emmannuelle	Lord Chief Justice	
1980	The Mirror Crack'd	Villager at Film Screening	Uncredited
1982	The Return of the Soldier	Lord Lieutenant	
1983	The Dresser	Horace Brown	
1984	Another Country	Senior Chaplain	
1987	Withnail and I	Tea Shop Proprietor	
1988	A Fish Called Wanda	Sir John	
1993	Splitting Heirs	Old Major	

Trade union offices
Preceded by Charles Purdom	General Secretary of Equity; 1940–1946	Succeeded by Gordon Sandison
