= Bishop Walsh Catholic School =

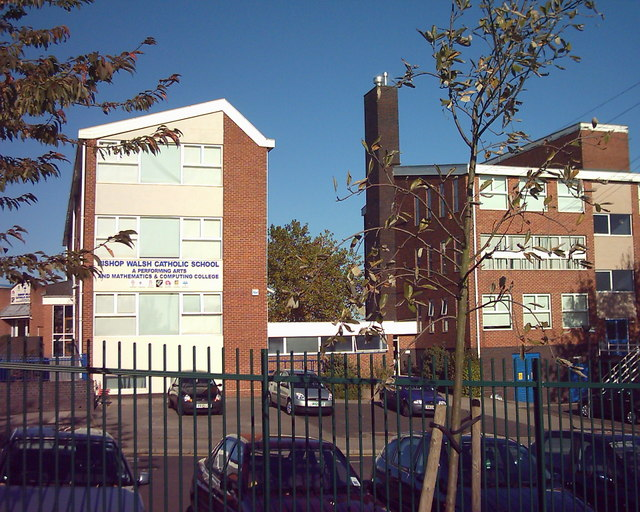

Location
- Wylde Green Road; Sutton Coldfield, Birmingham, West Midlands, B76 1QT; England
- Coordinates: 52.5472°N 1.8114°W

Information
- Type: Academy
- Motto: Academic Excellence, Social Awareness, Spiritual Development
- Religious affiliation: Roman Catholic
- Established: 1966
- Department for Education URN: 140524 Tables
- Ofsted: Reports
- Head teacher: Natalie Brodie
- Gender: Co-educational
- Age: 11 to 18
- Enrolment: 1049
- Houses: St Augustine, St Benedict, St Clare, St Dominic, St Francis, St Ignatius
- Colours: Blue, Red & White
- Website: http://www.bishopwalsh.net

Bishop Walsh Catholic School is a coeducational secondary school and sixth form with academy status, located in Sutton Coldfield, Birmingham in the West Midlands of England. The school is part of the St. John Paul II Multi-Academy Company. The school's motto is 'Guided by Christ, we aspire to achieve'. It is led by principal Natalie Brodie.

== Buildings ==
In 2019 the school requested planning permission for an extension to the building to replace temporary classrooms. These had been on the site since 2008 and, because of their damp condition, were thought to be causing minor illnesses for students and staff. The new extension is planned to provide sixth-form accommodation.

== School performance ==
The school's first inspection following academisation was in 2016, with the judgement of Good. There was a further inspection in 2020, which repeated the judgement of Good.

== Alumni ==
- Louie Barry (b. 2003) - professional footballer, Stockport County F.C.
- Paul W. Fleming (b. 1988) - trade union leader
- Liam Kinsella (b.1996) - professional footballer, Cheltenham Town F.C.
- Jane Sixsmith (b. 1967) - field hockey player
- Antony Zacaroli (b. 1958) - high court judge
