= Equity (British trade union) =

Performing arts trade union

- Equity (incorporating the Variety Artistes' Federation)

- Equity's Emblem
- Founded: 1930; 96 years ago
- Headquarters: Guild House, Upper St Martin's Lane, London, England, WC2H 9EG
- Members: ▲48,606 (2024)
- General Secretary: Paul W. Fleming
- President: Lynda Rooke
- Affiliations: TUC; STUC; FEU; FIA
- Website: equity.org.uk

Equity, formerly officially titled the British Actors' Equity Association, is the trade union for the performing arts and entertainment industries in the United Kingdom.

Formed by a group of West End performers in 1930, the union grew to include theatre performers stage management nationwide, as well as gaining recognition in audio, film, and television. Equity incorporated the Variety Artistes' Federation in 1967, and now represents most professionals whose work is presented on stage or screen.

As of 2021, it had just over 46,000 members, including actors, singers, dancers, variety artistes and other performers, models, theatre directors, choreographers, designers, and stage management.

Equity requires its members to have unique professional names to avoid confusion with other artists and entertainers.

== History ==
Equity was created in 1930 by a group of West End performers, including Godfrey Tearle, May Whitty and Ben Webster. They were advised by Robert Young, the "Actors' MP". Like many other British trade unions, Equity operated a closed shop policy, so it was not possible for someone to join unless they had a record of sufficient paid work and most jobs were reserved for Equity card holders. To allow new members to join, there were a limited number of non-card-holding jobs on regional productions. While working on these productions, actors held a provisional membership card, and could apply for full membership upon completing the requisite number of weeks, subsequently allowing them to work in the West End or on film and television.

As a result of reforms of trade unions by Margaret Thatcher's Conservative government and the introduction of European legislation, closed-shop unions became illegal in the UK and Equity discontinued their closed-shop policy in the 1980s. However, to join Equity in the present day, evidence of sufficient paid professional work must still be provided. In 1976, Equity introduced a policy of refusing to sell programmes to the SABC, an action that led to a virtual ban of British television in apartheid-era South Africa, which was not lifted until 1993.

The Clarence Derwent Awards are theatre awards given annually by Equity on Broadway in the US and Equity UK in London's West End.

In regard to the 2023 SAG-AFTRA strike, Equity released a statement: 'Equity stands full square behind our sister union.'

== Presidents ==
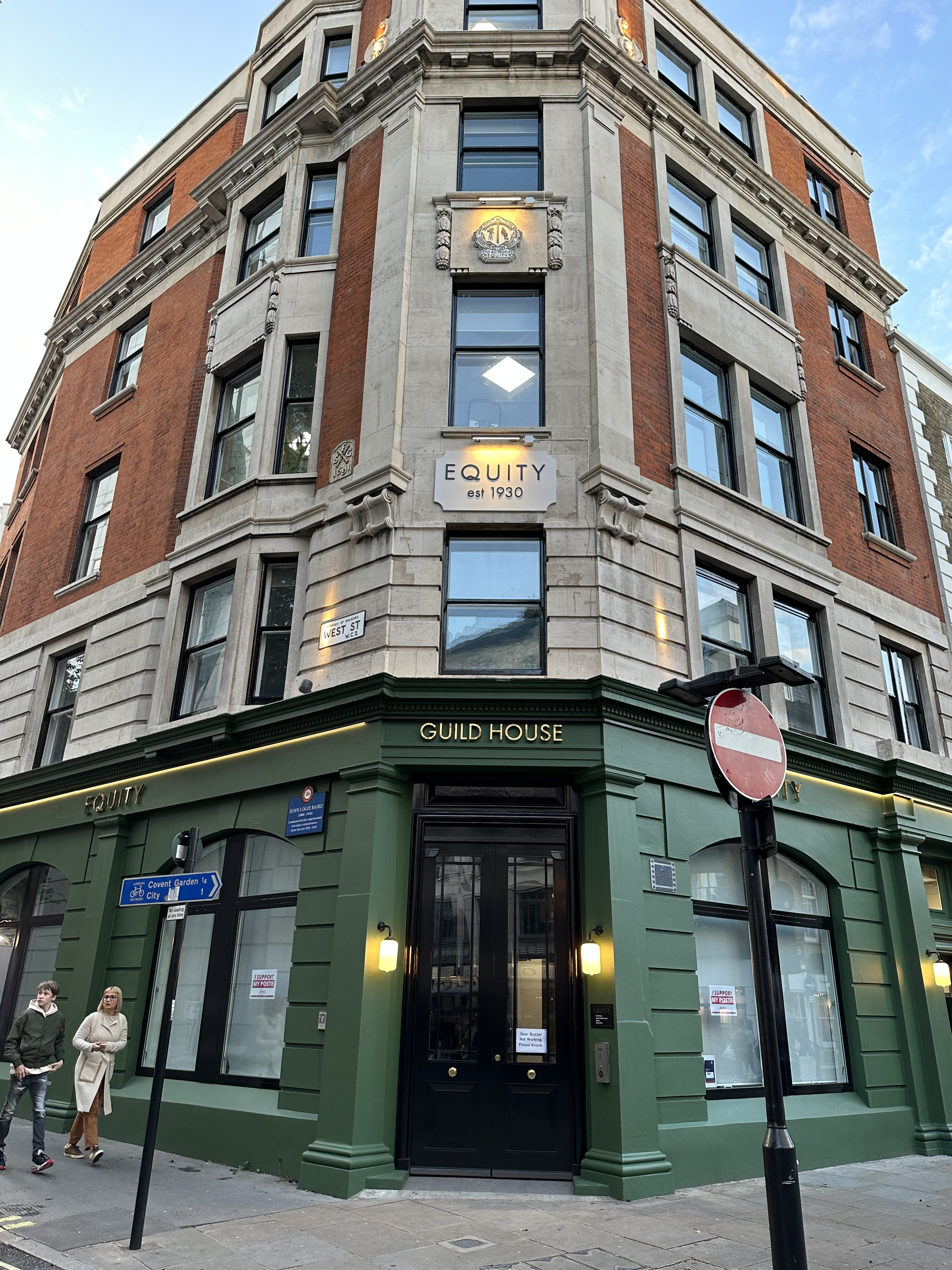
The headquarters of Equity at Guild House on the corner of Upper St Martin's Lane and West Street, London WC2

- 1932: Godfrey Seymour Tearle
- 1940: Lewis Thomas Casson
- 1946: Beatrix Lehmann
- 1948: Leslie Banks
- 1949: Felix Aylmer
- 1969: Ernest Clark
- 1973: André Morell
- 1975: Hugh Manning
- 1978: John Barron
- 1982: Hugh Manning
- 1984: Derek Bond
- 1986: Nigel Davenport
- 1992: Jeffry Wickham
- 1994: Frederick Pyne
- 2002: Harry Landis
- 2008: Graham Hamilton
- 2010: Malcolm Sinclair
- 2018: Maureen Beattie
- 2022: Lynda Rooke

== General Secretaries ==
- 1930: Alfred M. Wall
- 1939: C. B. Purdom
- 1940: Llewellyn Rees
- 1946: Gordon Sandison
- 1958: Gerald Croasdell
- 1973: Peter Plouviez
- 1991: Ian McGarry
- 2005: Christine Payne
- 2020: Paul W. Fleming

== See also ==
- Actors' Equity Association
- Federation of Entertainment Unions
- International Federation of Actors
- Irish Congress of Trade Unions
- SAG-AFTRA
- Scottish Trades Union Congress
- Trades Union Congress
