= International Federation of Variety Artists =

- Merged into: International Federation of Actors
- Founded: 1952
- Dissolved: 1970
- Headquarters: 11 Maria-Theresienstrasse, Vienna
- Location: Austria
- Website: fia-actors.com

The International Federation of Variety Artists (IFVA) was a global union federation bringing together trade unions representing entertainers other than musicians and actors.

== History ==
The International Confederation of Free Trade Unions (ICFTU) organised a World Congress of Intellectual Workers in Brussels in 1951, and the idea for an international organisation of trade unions of variety artists arose. This led to a conference in Hamburg in 1952, at which the secretariat was established. Despite the ICFTU's role in its establishment, the IFVA did not affiliate to it, and instead worked closely with the independent International Federation of Musicians and International Federation of Actors (FIA).

One of the smallest international trade secretariats, by 1960, the IFVA had affiliates in five countries, with a total of only 4,045 members. In 1970, the federation merged into the FIA.

== Affiliates ==
In 1960, the following unions were affiliated to the federation:

| Union | Country | Affiliated membership |
|---|---|---|
| Danish Artist Union | Denmark | 200 |
| Norwegian Artists' Association | Norway | 20 |
| Swiss Artists' Lodge | Switzerland | 125 |
| Union of Artists, Media Workers and Freelance Workers | Austria | 1,200 |
| Variety Artistes' Federation | United Kingdom | 2,500 |

== Leadership ==
=== General Secretaries ===
1952: Rudi Roeters
1950s: Robert Zagar

=== Presidents ===
1952: Willi Feldmann
1950s: Willy Manley
1960s: Vic Duncan
