= Gordon Sandison (trade unionist) =

British trade union leader (1913–1958)

Gordon Ramsay Sandison (17 April 1913 – 3 July 1958) was a British trade union leader.

Sandison won a scholarship to study at St John's College, Cambridge, before becoming a barrister. During World War II, he served in the Auxiliary Fire Service, and was its first member to serve on the executive of the Fire Brigades Union. At the 1945 UK general election, he stood unsuccessfully for the Labour Party in Southend-on-Sea.

Sandison was elected as acting general secretary of Equity in December 1946, and was appointed to the post on a permanent basis the following year. As leader of the union, he supported actors while theatres were closed due to a fuel shortage, organised more actors in film studios, and worked with the Musicians' Union and Variety Artistes' Federation to negotiate specific agreements for actors on television and radio, including repeat fees.

Initially, many union activists were suspicious that Sandison wanted to use the post for his own political ambitions, but he countered this by establishing democratically elected committees to oversee each aspect of the union's activity.

In 1956, Sandison was elected as president of the International Federation of Actors. However, his health became increasingly poor, and he died on 3 July 1958, at the age of 45.

Trade union offices
Preceded by Llewellyn Rees	General Secretary of Equity; 1946–1958	Succeeded by Gerald Croasdell
Preceded by Jean Darcante	President of the International Federation of Actors; 1956–1958	Succeeded by Fernand Gravey
