= Peter Plouviez =

British trade union leader (1931–2017)

Peter William Plouviez FRSA (30 July 1931 – 5 October 2017) was a British trade union leader.

Plouviez began working for the British Actors' Equity Association in 1960, and became its general secretary in 1974. As leader of the union, he arranged for the Variety Artistes' Federation to join, and also built closer ties with the Actors' Equity Association and Screen Actors Guild in the United States. Under his leadership, membership of the union grew from 10,000 to 46,000, although about 80% of them were out of work at any given time.

Plouviez retired in 1991, and was made a Fellow of the Royal Society of Arts the following year. Also in 1992, he became chair of the Equity Trust Fund, a position he held until 2006.

Trade union offices
Preceded by Gerald Croasdell	General Secretary of Equity; 1974–1991	Succeeded by Ian McGarry
