= Per T. Ohlsson =

Swedish journalist and author (1958–2021)

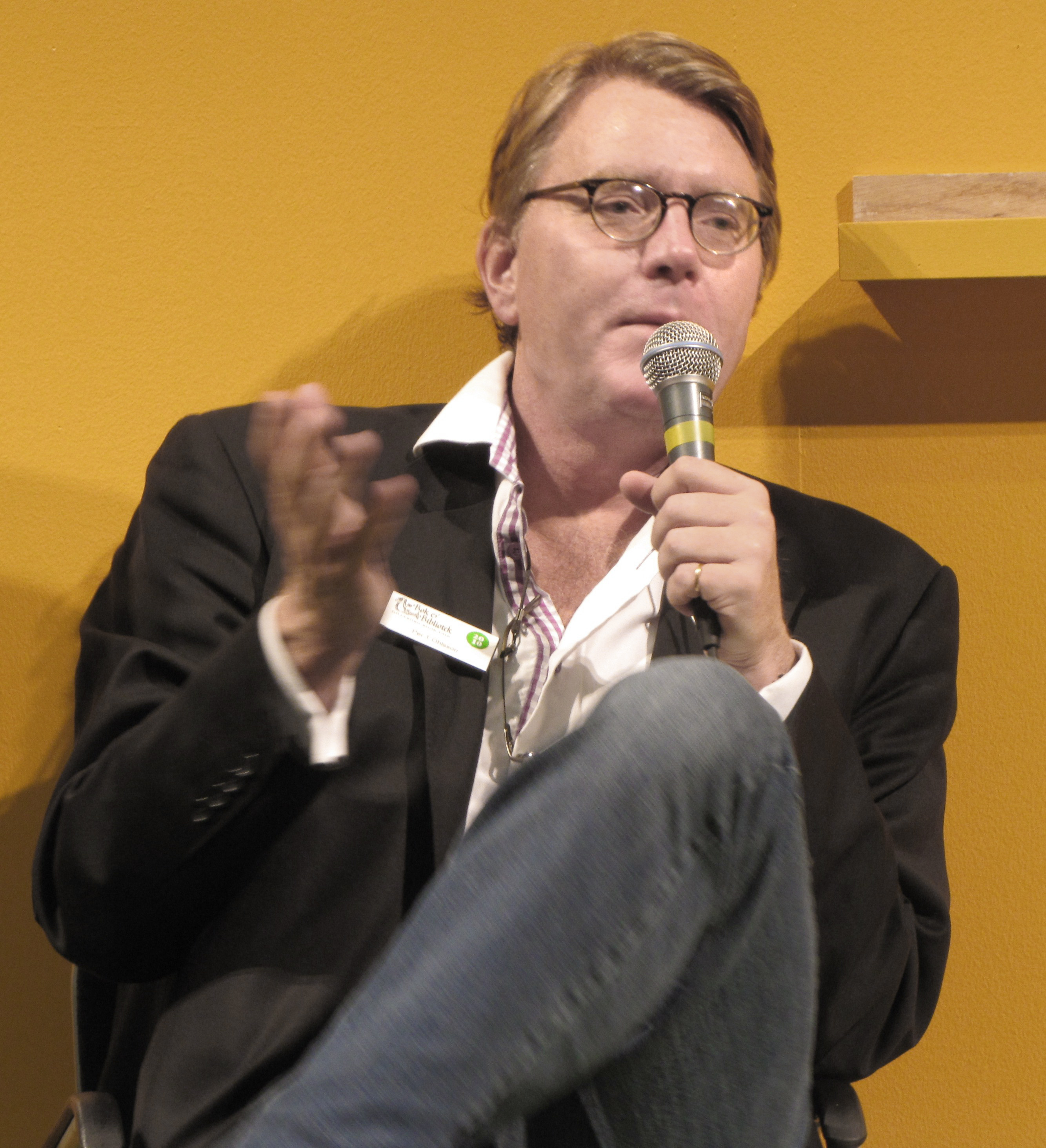
Ohlsson in 2010

Per Evald Torbjörn Ohlsson (3 March 1958 – 27 October 2021) was a Swedish journalist and author.

== Biography ==
Ohlsson studied at Lund University, where he also was editor of the student newspaper Lundagård from 1980 to 1981. He then worked as a journalist for the newspaper Expressen from 1982 to 1985. From 1985 to 1988 he was a correspondent in the United States for the newspaper Sydsvenska Dagbladet and from 1990 to 2005 he was political editor-in-chief at Sydsvenska Dagbladet (which classifies itself as "independently liberal"). From 2005 he was a senior columnist for the same newspaper.

Ohlsson published, among other books, a biography on the former Swedish Minister for Finance Johan August Gripenstedt (100 år av tillväxt : Johan August Gripenstedt och den liberala revolutionen, 1994) and on the Austrian-Swedish entrepreneur Herbert Felix (Konservkungen : Herbert Felix – ett flyktingöde i 1900-talets Europa, 2006). In 1998, he received the Söderberg Foundation Award for Journalism (Det Söderbergska Journalistpriset).

== Bibliography ==
- En rak höger med knogjärnet (in Swedish). Stockholm: Timbro. 1991.
- Landet utanför : Saddam och ståndpunkterna (in Swedish). Stockholm: Timbro. 1991. ISBN 91-7566-230-2.
- New York, Malmö, Sydsvenskan (in Swedish). Malmö: Sydsvenska Dagbladet. 1991. ISBN 91-970999-6-1.
- Over there : banden över Atlanten (in Swedish). Stockholm: Timbro. 1992. ISBN 91-7566-242-6.
- Gudarnas ö : om det extremt svenska (in Swedish). Stockholm: Bromberg. 1993. ISBN 91-7608-603-8.
- 100 år av tillväxt : Johan August Gripenstedt och den liberala revolutionen (in Swedish). Stockholm: Bromberg. 1994. ISBN 91-7608-650-X.
- Konservkungen : Herbert Felix – ett flyktingöde i 1900-talets Europa (in Swedish). Stockholm: Bonnier Fakta. 2006. ISBN 91-85015-88-1.
- Den enda supermakten – hur förhåller vi oss till den? (in Swedish). Stockholm: Bertil Ohlin-institutet. 2006. ISBN 91-974777-6-1.
- Svensk politik (in Swedish). Lund: Historiska Media. 2014. ISBN 9789187031441.
