= Ian McGarry =

British trade union leader (born 1941)

Ian McGarry (born 27 February 1941) is a British former trade union leader.

McGarry attended Chichester High School and Lewes County Grammar School. He joined the Labour Party, and from 1964 to 1976 was its full-time constituency agent in Putney. He also served on Wandsworth London Borough Council, leading the Labour group.

In 1976, McGarry began working for the actors' trade union, Equity, as its assistant general secretary, with responsibility for its "mechanical media department". In 1991 he was elected as the union's general secretary. As leader, he commissioned a report into the union's structures, "Action 2000", which was partially implemented, the union being restructured with the aim of improving its finances. He retired in 2005.

Trade union offices
Preceded by Peter Plouviez	General Secretary of Equity; 1991–2006	Succeeded by Christine Payne
