= International Federation of Actors =

Global union federation

- Federation Internationale des Acteurs
- Abbreviation: FIA
- Founded: 1952; 74 years ago
- Headquarters: Brussels, Belgium
- President: Gabrielle Carteris
- General secretary: Dominick Luquer
- Affiliations: International Arts and Entertainment Alliance
- Website: fia-actors.com

The International Federation of Actors (French: Fédération Internationale des Acteurs, FIA) is a global union federation bringing together trade unions representing actors.

== History ==
The federation was established in 1952, on the initiative of the British Actors' Equity Association, and the Syndicat Français des Artistes-Inteprètes. The organisation's logo was designed by Jean Cocteau. In 1970, the International Federation of Variety Artists joined the organisation.

For many years, the secretariat was independent of both the main international federations of trade unions, the International Confederation of Free Trade Unions and the World Federation of Trade Unions, and as such, by the 1980s, it represented both unions in capitalist countries, and in communist countries.

In 1997, the organisation affiliated with the International Arts and Entertainment Alliance.

== Leadership ==
=== General Secretaries ===
1952: Pierre Chesnais
1968: Rolf Rembe
1974: Gerald Croasdell
1983: Rolf Rembe
1991: Michael Crosby
1996: Katherine Sand
2001: Dominick Luquer

=== Presidents ===
1952: Jean Darcante / Gérard Philipe
1956: Gordon Sandison
1958: Fernand Gravey
1964: Rodolfo Landa
1967: Vlastimil Fisar
1970: Pierre Boucher
1973: France Delahalle
1982: Peter Heinz Kersten
1992: Tomas Bolme
2008: Agnete Haaland
2012: Ferne Downey
2021: Gabrielle Carteris
