= 1968 Southwark London Borough Council election =

1968 Southwark Council election
- 9 May 1968

All council seats
	First party	Second party
Party	Labour	Conservative
Seats won	43	27
Seat change	▼21	▲21
Popular vote	18,963	22,918
Percentage	42.45%	51.31%
Swing	▼24.31	▲25.98
Council Control before election
Labour
Council Control
Labour

Elections to Southwark Council were held in May 1968. The whole council was up for election. Turnout was 20.7%. There were 23 wards.

This election had aldermen as well as councillors. Labour got all ten aldermen as well as 33 directly elected councillors.

== Election result ==

Southwark local election result 1968
Party	Seats	Gains	Losses	Net gain/loss	Seats %	Votes %	Votes	+/−
Conservative	27	21	0	▲21	38.57	51.31	22,918	▲25.98
Labour	43	0	21	▼21	61.43	42.45	18,963	▼24.31
Communist	0	0	0	Steady	0.00	3.86	1,724	▲0.96
Liberal	0	0	0	Steady	0.00	2.38	1,062	▼2.63

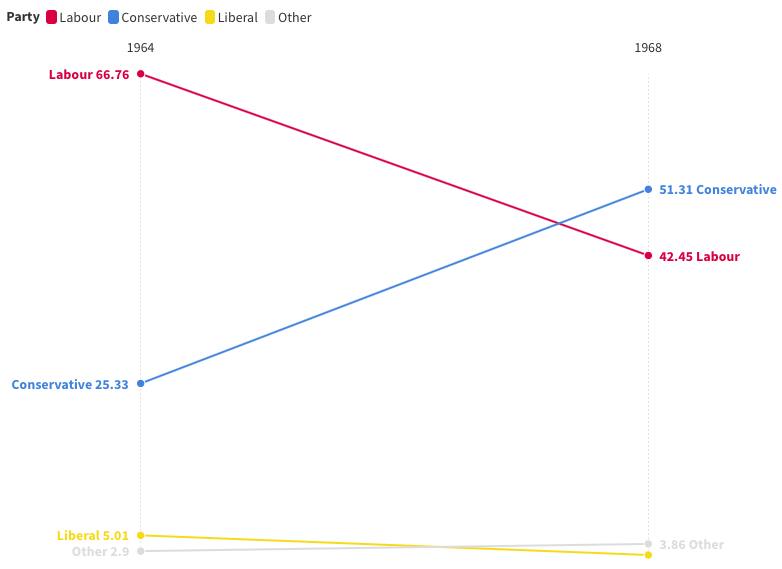
Southwark Council voting history

== Ward results ==
=== Abbey ===
Abbey (2)
Party	Candidate	Votes	%	±%
Labour	C.A. Sawyer	1,153	74.2	
Labour	C.J. Coveney	1,108	71.3	
Conservative	F.A. Reddin	456	29.4	
Communist	R. Gordon	183	11.8	
Turnout		1,553	22.0	
Labour hold		Swing		
Labour hold		Swing		

=== Alleyn ===
Alleyn (2)
Party	Candidate	Votes	%	±%
Conservative	H.S. Partridge	1,330	59.2	
Conservative	R.C. Gent	1,316	58.5	
Labour	G.W. Byfield	628	27.9	
Labour	M.G. Stevens	613	27.3	
Liberal	J.F. Hayes	229	10.2	
Liberal	B.G. Awty	217	9.7	
Turnout		2,248	34.3	
Conservative gain from Labour		Swing		
Conservative gain from Labour		Swing		

=== Bellenden ===
Bellenden (3)
Party	Candidate	Votes	%	±%
Conservative	B.C. Leach	1,848	65.7	
Conservative	A.G. Sinclair	1,794	63.8	
Conservative	R.P. Primmer	1,777	63.2	
Labour	F.E. Lee	886	31.5	
Labour	D.J.V. Moore	863	30.7	
Labour	E.J. Kemp	858	30.5	
Turnout		2,813	28.6	
Conservative gain from Labour		Swing		
Conservative gain from Labour		Swing		
Conservative gain from Labour		Swing		

=== Bricklayers ===
Bricklayers (2)
Party	Candidate	Votes	%	±%
Labour	L.A.J. Henley	768	63.8	
Labour	Mrs F. Whitnall	754	62.6	
Conservative	C.C. Hayward	373	31.0	
Conservative	F.H. Morgan	368	30.6	
Communist	A. Jacovou	40	3.3	
Turnout		1,204	18.6	
Labour hold		Swing		
Labour hold		Swing		

=== Browning ===
Browning (3)
Party	Candidate	Votes	%	±%
Labour	J.R. McCoid	789	43.6	
Labour	J.S. Lees	773	42.7	
Labour	Rev J.W. Watson	770	42.5	
Conservative	A.I. Robin	560	30.9	
Conservative	J. Gordon	555	30.7	
Conservative	G. Chandler	550	30.4	
Communist	S.P. Bent	398	22.0	
Communist	Mrs S.M. Hume	333	18.4	
Communist	T.C. Fuller	330	18.2	
Turnout		1,810	17.8	
Labour hold		Swing		
Labour hold		Swing		
Labour hold		Swing		

=== Brunswick ===
Brunswick (3)
Party	Candidate	Votes	%	±%
Labour	Mrs E.S. Daymond	775	47.1	
Labour	E.W.T. Pruce	767	46.7	
Conservative	C.B. Cumming	765	46.5	
Conservative	Mrs N.R. Cumming	757	46.0	
Labour	Miss A.G. Liddle	754	45.9	
Conservative	Miss C.N. Frizell	720	43.8	
Communist	Mrs J. Willoughby	82	5.0	
Turnout		1,644	17.9	
Labour hold		Swing		
Labour hold		Swing		
Conservative gain from Labour		Swing		

=== Burgess ===
Burgess (3)
Party	Candidate	Votes	%	±%
Conservative	Mrs J.R. Bryant	711	47.0	
Labour	Mrs J.E. Cannon	710	47.0	
Labour	R. Richards	690	45.6	
Conservative	Mrs L.V. Best	685	45.3	
Labour	G.A. Tarrant	683	45.2	
Conservative	Mrs M.M. Tuck	655	43.3	
Communist	P.J. Hicks	108	7.1	
Turnout		1,512	15.5	
Conservative gain from Labour		Swing		
Labour hold		Swing		
Labour hold		Swing		

=== Cathedral ===
Cathedral (3)
Party	Candidate	Votes	%	±%
Labour	C.C. Gates	644	44.6	
Labour	E.J. Hall	619	42.9	
Labour	M. Warne	590	40.9	
Communist	E.D. Hume	436	30.2	
Conservative	L.E. Monkhouse	428	29.7	
Conservative	Mrs M.M. Jesshop	410	28.4	
Conservative	F.N. Richardson	410	28.4	
Turnout		1,443	14.2	
Labour hold		Swing		
Labour hold		Swing		
Labour hold		Swing		

=== Chaucer ===
Chaucer (3)
Party	Candidate	Votes	%	±%
Labour	C.A. Farrow	766	48.6	
Labour	Mrs N.G. Farrow	758	48.1	
Labour	N.H. Tertis	725	46.0	
Conservative	D.M. Lang	701	44.5	
Conservative	G.R. Baxter	677	43.0	
Conservative	Miss B. North	677	43.0	
Communist	Miss M.B. Brooks	177	11.2	
Turnout		1,576	15.6	
Labour hold		Swing		
Labour hold		Swing		
Labour hold		Swing		

=== College ===
College (2)
Party	Candidate	Votes	%	±%
Conservative	R.W. Ames	2,024	65.2	
Conservative	B.G.J. Hoskins	2,015	65.0	
Labour	Mrs J. Lee	709	22.9	
Labour	T.E. Pilford	657	21.2	
Liberal	C.A. Williams	299	9.6	
Liberal	J.C. Williams	281	9.1	
Communist	Mrs E. Miles	98	3.2	
Turnout		3,102	43.1	
Conservative hold		Swing		
Conservative hold		Swing		

=== Consort ===
Consort (3)
Party	Candidate	Votes	%	±%
Conservative	Mrs F.G. Percival	982	53.5	
Conservative	R. Percival	941	51.2	
Conservative	Mrs J.C. Hudson	900	49.0	
Labour	W.F. Jones	865	47.1	
Labour	Mrs B.D. Chambers	793	43.2	
Labour	A.P. Chambers	769	41.9	
Turnout		1,837	17.5	
Conservative gain from Labour		Swing		
Conservative gain from Labour		Swing		
Conservative gain from Labour		Swing		

=== Dockyard ===
Dockyard (2)
Party	Candidate	Votes	%	±%
Labour	Mrs L.M. Brown	984	69.6	
Labour	John H. O’Grady	897	63.5	
Conservative	P. Gray	437	30.9	
Turnout		1,413	22.8	
Labour hold		Swing		
Labour hold		Swing		

=== Faraday ===
Faraday (4)
Party	Candidate	Votes	%	±%
Labour	S.R. Combes	1,173	54.4	
Labour	J.T. Greening	1,167	54.1	
Labour	F.W. Combes	1,166	54.1	
Labour	Mrs A.E. Waller	1,128	52.3	
Conservative	C.C. Keene	672	31.2	
Conservative	J.K. Bennett	629	29.2	
Conservative	S.H. Smith	627	29.1	
Liberal	Mrs M.E. Crockett	333	15.4	
Liberal	Miss M. Paling	296	13.7	
Liberal	G.H. Larden	280	13.0	
Liberal	Mrs C.K. Howard	255	11.8	
Turnout		2,156	17.8	
Labour hold		Swing		
Labour hold		Swing		
Labour hold		Swing		
Labour hold		Swing		

=== Friary ===
Friary (3)
Party	Candidate	Votes	%	±%
Labour	F.A. Goldwin	806	52.7	
Labour	Mrs M.V. Goldwin	777	50.8	
Labour	R.A. Cheesewright	751	49.1	
Conservative	Mrs J.V. Goldson	702	45.9	
Conservative	Mrs C.E. Pitman	675	44.1	
Conservative	Mrs M.A. Vaughan	658	43.0	
Turnout		1,529	15.0	
Labour hold		Swing		
Labour hold		Swing		
Labour hold		Swing		

=== Lyndhurst ===
Lyndhurst (3)
Party	Candidate	Votes	%	±%
Conservative	Mrs P.C. Cooper	2,030	57.1	
Conservative	I.M. Andrews	1,968	55.3	
Conservative	R. Spilberg	1,956	55.0	
Labour	E. Corderoy	1,376	38.7	
Labour	Mrs A. Inman	1,348	37.9	
Labour	H.C. Potter	1,342	37.7	
Communist	A. Rolle	127	3.6	
Turnout		3,558	34.7	
Conservative gain from Labour		Swing		
Conservative gain from Labour		Swing		
Conservative gain from Labour		Swing		

=== Newington ===
Newington (3)
Party	Candidate	Votes	%	±%
Labour	C.A.G. Halford	944	52.0	
Labour	Mrs C.M. Clunn	932	51.3	
Labour	J.A. Matheson	911	50.1	
Conservative	A.L.A. Constable	794	43.7	
Conservative	Mrs R. Constable	777	42.8	
Conservative	E.G. Taylor	775	42.7	
Turnout		1,817	18.1	
Labour hold		Swing		
Labour hold		Swing		
Labour hold		Swing		

=== Riverside ===
Riverside (2)
Party	Candidate	Votes	%	±%
Labour	J. Colmy	938	66.5	
Labour	L.T. Tucker	894	63.4	
Conservative	Miss H.C.A. Mitchell	446	31.6	
Conservative	J.B. Wheatley	411	29.1	
Turnout		1,410	21.5	
Labour hold		Swing		
Labour hold		Swing		

=== Rotherhithe ===
Rotherhithe (2)
Party	Candidate	Votes	%	±%
Labour	W.L. Ellis	891	70.1	
Labour	H.W. Young	862	67.8	
Conservative	Mrs I.E. Arrowsmith	342	26.9	
Conservative	G.G. Colbran	339	26.7	
Turnout		1,271	19.0	
Labour hold		Swing		
Labour hold		Swing		

=== Ruskin ===
Ruskin (2)
Party	Candidate	Votes	%	±%
Conservative	Mrs H.E. Day	2,463	78.2	
Conservative	H.J. Grant	2,458	78.0	
Labour	Mrs F.E. Sampson	634	20.1	
Labour	A.N. Bransom	628	19.9	
Turnout		3,151	46.0	
Conservative hold		Swing		
Conservative hold		Swing		

=== Rye ===
Rye (2)
Party	Candidate	Votes	%	±%
Conservative	A.P. Pritchett	1,936	70.1	
Conservative	W.V. Fuller	1,895	68.6	
Labour	Miss M.J. Roff	530	19.2	
Labour	P.J. Gethin	528	19.1	
Liberal	Mrs A.M. Bennett	263	9.5	
Liberal	Mrs L.R. Darsley	253	9.2	
Turnout		2,761	38.8	
Conservative hold		Swing		
Conservative hold		Swing		

=== St Giles ===
St Giles (3)
Party	Candidate	Votes	%	±%
Conservative	M.P. Mulligan	1,120	54.8	
Conservative	G. Scott	1,088	53.2	
Conservative	M.D. Simmons	1,066	52.1	
Labour	Mrs E.M. Dalton	855	41.8	
Labour	L.H. Alden	843	41.2	
Labour	R. Wedlake	827	40.4	
Turnout		2,045	19.7	
Conservative gain from Labour		Swing		
Conservative gain from Labour		Swing		
Conservative gain from Labour		Swing		

=== The Lane ===
The Lane (3)
Party	Candidate	Votes	%	±%
Conservative	D.P. Cianfarani	891	49.6	
Conservative	Mrs L.C. Marshall	869	48.4	
Conservative	G.N. Thornton	848	47.2	
Labour	F.J. Francis	822	45.8	
Labour	F.T. Rolfe	785	43.7	
Labour	P. Cather	760	42.3	
Communist	E.L. Hodson	119	6.6	
Turnout		1,796	19.0	
Conservative win (new seat)				
Conservative win (new seat)				
Conservative win (new seat)				

=== Waverley ===
Waverley (2)
Party	Candidate	Votes	%	±%
Conservative	F.J. Shirley	1,292	62.0	
Conservative	A.E. Smith	1,271	61.0	
Labour	H.T. Ball	749	35.9	
Labour	H.H. Guichard	729	35.0	
Turnout		2,085	33.7	
Conservative gain from Labour		Swing		
Conservative gain from Labour		Swing		

== By-Elections ==
Consort by-election, 25 July 1968
Party	Candidate	Votes	%	±%
Conservative	D. M. Lang	808	52.7	−0.8
Labour	W. F. Jones	725	47.3	+0.2
Turnout		1,533	14.6	−2.9
Conservative hold		Swing		
