= The Lane (ward) =

- Former electoral ward for the Southwark London Borough Council
- The Lane ward boundaries from 2002 to 2018
- Borough: Southwark
- County: Greater London
- Major settlements: Peckham

Former electoral ward
- Created: 1965
- Abolished: 2018
- Number of members: 1968–1978: 3; 1978–2002: 2; 2002–2018: 3
- ONS code: 00BEGY (2002–2018)
- GSS code: E05000553 (2002–2018)

The Lane was an electoral ward in the London Borough of Southwark from 1968 to 2018. The ward was first used in the 1968 elections and last used at the 2014 elections. It returned councillors to Southwark London Borough Council.

== Southwark council elections ==
=== 1968 election ===
The election took place on 9 May 1968.

1968 Southwark London Borough Council election: The Lane (3)
Party	Candidate	Votes	%	±%
Conservative	D. Cianfarani	891	49.6	
Conservative	L. Marshall	869	48.4	
Conservative	G. Thornton	848	47.2	
Labour	F. Francis	822	45.8	
Labour	F. Rolfe	785	43.7	
Labour	P. Cather	760	42.3	
Communist	E. Hodson	119	6.6	
Turnout		1,796	19.0	
Conservative win (new seat)				
Conservative win (new seat)				
Conservative win (new seat)				
