= Faraday (ward) =

- Electoral ward for the Southwark London Borough Council
- Faraday ward boundaries since 2018
- Borough: Southwark
- County: Greater London
- Population: 12,465 (2021)
- Electorate: 7,783 (2022)
- Area: 0.7734 square kilometres (0.2986 sq mi)

Current electoral ward
- Created: 1965
- Number of members: 3
- Councillors: Sam Foster; Kezia Harper; Mohamed Deen
- GSS code: E05011102 (2018–present)

Faraday is an electoral ward in the London Borough of Southwark. The ward has existed since the creation of the borough on 1 April 1965 and was first used in the 1964 elections. It returns three councillors to Southwark London Borough Council.

== Southwark council elections since 2018 ==
There was a revision of ward boundaries in Southwark in 2018.

=== 2024 by-election ===
The by-election on 4 July 2024 took place on the same day as the United Kingdom general election. It followed the resignation of Kimberly McIntosh.

2024 Faraday by-election
Party	Candidate	Votes	%	±%
Labour	Mohamed Deen	2,201		
Green	Catherine Dawkins	952		
Liberal Democrats	Dhiren Ponnambalam	315		
Conservative	Jordan Abdi	301		
Turnout				
Labour hold		Swing		

=== 2022 election ===
The election took place on 5 May 2022.

2022 Southwark London Borough Council election: Faraday
Party	Candidate	Votes	%	±%
Labour	Sam Foster	1,475	63.4	▼4.8
Labour	Kezia Harper	1,450	62.4	▼5.0
Labour	Kimberly McIntosh	1,445	62.2	▼3.4
Green	Emma He	390	16.8	▲3.6
Green	Liba Hoskin	369	15.9	▲3.9
Conservative	Novelette Ellis	250	10.8	▲2.4
Conservative	Andrew Neville	226	9.7	▲1.5
Liberal Democrats	David Noakes	216	9.3	▲0.4
Let London Live	Piers Corbyn	200	8.6	New
Liberal Democrats	Cheikh Jalloh	197	8.5	▼0.3
Liberal Democrats	Lorraine Zuleta	189	8.1	▲0.4
Conservative	Tarsilo Onuluk	174	7.5	▼0.5
Turnout		2,325	29.87	+0.16
Labour hold		Swing		
Labour hold		Swing		
Labour hold		Swing		

=== 2018 election ===
The election took place on 3 May 2018.

2018 Southwark London Borough Council election: Faraday
Party	Candidate	Votes	%	±%
Labour	Lorraine Lauder	1,747	68.2	
Labour	Paul W. Fleming	1,726	67.4	
Labour	Jack Buck	1,679	65.6	
Green	Liam Hennessy	338	13.2	
Green	Liba Hoskin	308	12.0	
Green	Ignas Galvelis	291	11.4	
Liberal Democrats	Tim Colbourne	228	8.9	
Liberal Democrats	Chris Hudson	226	8.8	
Conservative	Novelette Ellis	214	8.4	
Conservative	Loana Morrison	209	8.2	
Conservative	David Furze	204	8.0	
Liberal Democrats	Lauren Pemberton-Nelson	198	7.7	
Majority				
Turnout		2,560	29.71	
Labour win (new boundaries)				
Labour win (new boundaries)				
Labour win (new boundaries)				

== 2002–2018 Southwark council elections ==
Faraday ward boundaries from 2002 to 2018

There was a revision of ward boundaries in Southwark in 2002.

== 1978–2002 Southwark council elections ==
There was a revision of ward boundaries in Southwark in 1978.

== 1968–1978 Southwark council elections ==
There was a revision of ward boundaries in Southwark in 1968.

== 1964–1968 Southwark council elections ==
=== 1964 election ===
The election took place on 7 May 1964.
