= Newington (ward) =

Electoral ward in the London borough of Southwark

- Electoral ward for the Southwark London Borough Council
- Newington ward boundaries since 2018
- Borough: Southwark
- County: Greater London
- Population: 13,443 (2021)
- Electorate: 10,233 (2022)
- Area: 0.7296 square kilometres (0.2817 sq mi)

Current electoral ward
- Created: 1965
- GSS code: E05011105 (2018–present)

Newington is an electoral ward in the London Borough of Southwark. The ward has existed since the creation of the borough on 1 April 1965 and was first used in the 1964 elections.

== Southwark council elections since 2018 ==
There was a revision of ward boundaries in Southwark in 2018.

=== 2023 by-election ===
The by-election was held on 29 June 2023, following the resignation of Alice Macdonald.

2023 Newington by-election
Party	Candidate	Votes	%	±%
Labour	Youcef Hassaine	1,524	57.6	−7.2
Liberal Democrats	Vikas Aggarwal	738	27.9	+14.0
Green	Ruben Buendia	237	9.0	−4.0
Conservative	Lewis Jones	149	5.6	−2.7
Majority		786	29.7	
Turnout		2,648		
Labour hold		Swing		

=== 2022 election ===
The election took place on 5 May 2022.

2022 Southwark London Borough Council election: Newington
Party	Candidate	Votes	%	±%
Labour	Alice Macdonald	2,051	63.4	+2.0
Labour	Natasha Ennin	2,011	62.1	−3.6
Labour	John Batteson	1,955	60.4	−3.6
Green	Suzy Gillett	494	15.3	+2.1
Green	Clare Wood	453	14.0	+3.1
Liberal Democrats	James Gurling	408	12.6	−1.4
Green	Lina Usma	371	11.5	+1.1
Liberal Democrats	Abdul Gbla	368	11.4	−1.5
Liberal Democrats	Joshua Sharman	350	10.8	−1.7
Conservative	Charles Dempsey	311	9.6	+1.1
Conservative	Suzie Bridgen-Didier-Garnham	297	9.2	+1.3
Conservative	Erda Prenci	233	7.2	−0.3
Turnout		3,236	31.62	+0.03
Labour hold		Swing		
Labour hold		Swing		
Labour hold		Swing		

=== 2018 election ===
The election took place on 3 May 2018.

2018 Southwark London Borough Council election: Newington (3)
Party	Candidate	Votes	%	±%
Labour	Eleanor Kerslake	2,137	65.7	
Labour	James Coldwell	2,082	64.0	
Labour	Alice MacDonald	1,997	61.4	
Liberal Democrats	James Doran	457	14.0	
Green	Kate Belcheva	429	13.2	
Liberal Democrats	Harriet Shone	420	12.9	
Liberal Democrats	Alistair Bigos	406	12.5	
Green	David Powell	354	10.9	
Green	Betiel Mehari	337	10.4	
Conservative	Sue Badman	275	8.5	
Conservative	Will Amor	257	7.9	
Conservative	Joseph Lyons	243	7.5	
Majority				
Turnout		3,254	31.59	
Labour win (new boundaries)				
Labour win (new boundaries)				
Labour win (new boundaries)				

== 2002–2018 Southwark council elections ==
Newington ward boundaries from 2002 to 2018

There was a revision of ward boundaries in Southwark in 2002.

== 1978–2002 Southwark council elections ==
There was a revision of ward boundaries in Southwark in 1978.

== 1968–1978 Southwark council elections ==
There was a revision of ward boundaries in Southwark in 1968.

== 1964–1968 Southwark council elections ==
=== 1964 election ===
The election took place on 7 May 1964.
