= Camberwell Green (ward) =

- Electoral ward for the Southwark London Borough Council
- Camberwell Green boundaries since 2018
- Borough: Southwark
- County: Greater London
- Population: 15,509 (2021)
- Electorate: 10,922 (2022)
- Major settlements: Camberwell Green
- Area: 0.9612 square kilometres (0.3711 sq mi)

Current electoral ward
- Created: 2002
- Number of members: 3
- Councillors: Dora Dixon-Fyle; Kieron Williams; Suzanne Abachor
- GSS code: E05000535 (2002–2018); E05011096 (2018–present)

Camberwell Green is an electoral ward in the London Borough of Southwark. The ward has existed since the 2002 elections. It returns three councillors to Southwark London Borough Council.

== List of councillors ==
Term	Councillor	Party
2002–present	Dora Dixon-Fyle	Labour
2002–2010	John Friary	Labour
2002–2006	Anthony Ritchie	Labour
2006–2010	Christopher Page	Labour
2010–2014	Kevin Ahern	Labour
2010–2014	Emmanuel Oyewole	Labour
2014–2022	Tom Flynn	Labour
2014–present	Kieron Williams	Labour
2022–present	Suzanne Abachor	Labour

== Southwark council elections since 2018 ==
There was a revision of ward boundaries in Southwark in 2018.

=== 2022 election ===
The election took place on 5 May 2022.

2022 Southwark London Borough Council election: Camberwell Green
Party	Candidate	Votes	%	±%
Labour	Suzanne Abachor	2,282	69.2	▲3.1
Labour	Dora Dixon-Fyle	2,281	69.1	▼1.9
Labour	Kieron Williams	2,090	63.3	▼1.6
Green	Valerie Remy	798	24.2	▲6.7
Liberal Democrats	Douglas Board	353	10.7	▲4.4
Liberal Democrats	Christopher Hudson	350	10.7	▲5.2
Conservative	David Bradbury	273	8.3	▼1.5
Conservative	Robert Hayward	254	7.7	▼1.4
Conservative	Clara Vacondio	219	6.6	▼1.5
Liberal Democrats	Jason Leech	200	6.1	▼0.8
TUSC	Thea Everett	126	3.8	New
Turnout		3,300	30.21	−0.53
Labour hold		Swing		
Labour hold		Swing		
Labour hold		Swing		

=== 2018 election ===
The election took place on 3 May 2018.

2018 Southwark London Borough Council election: Camberwell Green
Party	Candidate	Votes	%	±%
Labour Co-op	Dora Dixon-Fyle	2,234	71.0	
Labour Co-op	Tom Flynn	2,082	66.1	
Labour Co-op	Kieron Williams	2,043	64.9	
Green	Tracey Beresford	552	17.5	
Green	Alexis Fidgett	376	11.9	
Conservative	Naomi Anderson	307	9.8	
Green	Paul Ingram	301	9.6	
Conservative	Robert Hayward	286	9.1	
Conservative	Erik O'Connor	254	8.1	
Liberal Democrats	Jason Leech	218	6.9	
Liberal Democrats	Nik Nicol	197	6.3	
Liberal Democrats	Joseph Willie	172	5.5	
Majority				
Turnout		3,148	30.74	
Labour Co-op win (new boundaries)				
Labour Co-op win (new boundaries)				
Labour Co-op win (new boundaries)				

== 2002–2018 Southwark council elections ==
Camberwell Green ward boundaries from 2002 to 2018

=== 2014 election ===
The election took place on 22 May 2014.

2014 Southwark London Borough Council election: Camberwell Green
Party	Candidate	Votes	%	±%
Labour	Tom Flynn	2,141	63.5	+4.2
Labour	Dora Dixon-Fyle	2,124	63.0	+4.4
Labour	Kieron Williams	1,933	57.3	+3.6
Green	Tracey Beresford	525	15.6	+7.5
Green	David Evans	360	10.7	+3.2
Green	Rosemary Friel	354	10.5	+4.9
Conservative	Robert Hayward	277	8.2	−1.8
Conservative	Colin Hann	271	8.0	−1.3
Liberal Democrats	Penny Lee	236	7.0	−14.0
Conservative	Marjorie Thompson	225	6.7	−2.7
Liberal Democrats	Georgina Orso	140	4.2	−8.8
Liberal Democrats	Richard Malins	136	4.0	−8.6
Turnout		3,391	32.2	−21.5
Labour hold		Swing		
Labour hold		Swing		
Labour hold		Swing		

=== 2010 election ===
The election on 6 May 2010 took place on the same day as the United Kingdom general election.

2010 Southwark London Borough Council election: Camberwell Green
Party	Candidate	Votes	%	±%
Labour	Kevin Ahern	3,261	59.3	−3.8
Labour	Dora Dixon-Fyle	3,224	58.6	−5.6
Labour	Emmanuel Oyewole	2,956	53.7	−6.4
Liberal Democrats	Yvonne Bruce	1,155	21.0	+3.6
Liberal Democrats	Philipp Leeta	713	13.0	−2.4
Liberal Democrats	Zita Mohamad	695	12.6	−1.7
Conservative	Ben Spencer	549	10.0	+2.0
Conservative	Marjorie Thompson	519	9.4	+1.7
Conservative	Graham Davison	510	9.3	+1.9
Green	Dawn Henderson	448	8.1	−4.0
Green	David Evans	412	7.5	−1.6
Camberwell Party	Jordana Chapman	391	7.1	N/A
Camberwell Party	James Johnston	323	5.9	N/A
Green	Paul Ingram	306	5.6	−3.4
Camberwell Party	Thomas Leighton	273	5.0	N/A
Turnout		5,503	53.7	+21.0
Labour hold		Swing		
Labour hold		Swing		
Labour hold		Swing		

=== 2006 election ===
The election took place on 4 May 2006.

2006 Southwark London Borough Council election: Camberwell Green
Party	Candidate	Votes	%	±%
Labour	Dora Dixon-Fyle	2,018	64.2	+14.3
Labour	John Friary	1,981	63.1	+16.6
Labour	Christopher Page	1,889	60.1	+16.3
Liberal Democrats	Peta Cubberley	545	17.4	−24.5
Liberal Democrats	Paul Miles	483	15.4	−26.0
Liberal Democrats	Jon Phillips	450	14.3	−26.7
Green	Joseph Healy	380	12.1	+6.0
Green	Michael Pardoe	285	9.1	+4.7
Green	Robbie Kelly	284	9.0	+5.3
Conservative	Robert Hayward	251	8.0	+4.2
Conservative	Gerald Chan	242	7.7	+3.9
Conservative	George Smith	231	7.4	+4.7
Turnout		3,159	32.7	+3.4
Labour hold		Swing		
Labour hold		Swing		
Labour hold		Swing		

=== 2002 election ===
The election took place on 2 May 2002.

2002 Southwark London Borough Council election: Camberwell Green
Party	Candidate	Votes	%	±%
Labour	Dora Dixon-Fyle	1,276	49.9	
Labour	John Friary	1,189	46.5	
Labour	Anthony Ritchie	1,120	43.8	
Liberal Democrats	Keith Miller	1,070	41.9	
Liberal Democrats	Beatrice Adeosun	1,059	41.4	
Liberal Democrats	Poddy Clark	1,048	41.0	
Green	Claire Armitage	155	6.1	
Green	Jack Woodford	113	4.4	
Conservative	Jeremy Hart	98	3.8	
Conservative	Robert Hayward	96	3.8	
Green	Lee Veitch	94	3.7	
Conservative	Julian Popov	68	2.7	
Turnout		2,565	29.3	
Labour win (new seat)				
Labour win (new seat)				
Labour win (new seat)				
