= Village (Southwark ward) =

- Former electoral ward for the Southwark London Borough Council
- Village ward boundaries from 2002 to 2018
- Borough: Southwark
- County: Greater London
- Population: 12,402 (2011)
- Electorate: 7,409 (2014)
- Area: 2.7879 square kilometres (1.0764 sq mi)

Former electoral ward
- Created: 2002
- Abolished: 2018
- Councillors: 3
- Replaced by: Dulwich Village
- ONS code: 00BEGZ
- GSS code: E05000554

Village was an electoral ward in the London Borough of Southwark from 2002 to 2018. The ward was first used in the 2002 elections and last used at the 2014 elections. It returned councillors to Southwark London Borough Council.

== Southwark council elections ==
=== 2014 election ===
The election took place on 22 May 2014.

2014 Southwark London Borough Council election: Village
| Party | Candidate | Votes | % | ±% |
|---|---|---|---|---|
| Conservative | Michael Mitchell | 1,604 | | |
| Conservative | Jane Lyons | 1,572 | | |
| Labour | Anne Kirby | 1,454 | | |
| Conservative | David Bradbury | 1,451 | | |
| Labour | Andrew Rice | 1,441 | | |
| Labour | Simon Taylor | 1,380 | | |
| Liberal Democrats | Robin Crookshank-Hilton | 948 | | |
| Green | Adrian Halfyard | 577 | | |
| Liberal Democrats | James Gurling | 549 | | |
| Green | Edmund Caldecott | 500 | | |
| Green | David Jennings | 470 | | |
| Liberal Democrats | Harry Niazi | 405 | | |
| UKIP | Michael King | 358 | | |
| Turnout | | 4,416 | 50.6 | −19.3 |
| Conservative hold | | Swing | | |
| Conservative hold | | Swing | | |
| Labour gain from Liberal Democrats | | Swing | | |

=== 2010 election ===
The election on 6 May 2010 took place on the same day as the United Kingdom general election.

2010 Southwark London Borough Council election: Village
| Party | Candidate | Votes | % | ±% |
|---|---|---|---|---|
| Liberal Democrats | Robin Crookshank Hilton | 2,376 | | |
| Conservative | Toby Eckersley | 2,217 | | |
| Conservative | Michael Mitchell | 2,168 | | |
| Conservative | David Bradbury | 2,156 | | |
| Labour | Kate Cinamon | 1,911 | | |
| Liberal Democrats | Christian Mitchell | 1,852 | | |
| Liberal Democrats | John Hedley | 1,829 | | |
| Labour | Duncan Chapman | 1,793 | | |
| Labour | Julia Rowley | 1,638 | | |
| Green | Robert Goodman | 929 | | |
| Green | Dee Hammond | 469 | | |
| Turnout | | 6,563 | 74.2 | +23.9 |
| Liberal Democrats gain from Conservative | | Swing | | |
| Conservative hold | | Swing | | |
| Conservative hold | | Swing | | |

=== 2006 election ===
The election took place on 4 May 2006.

2006 Southwark London Borough Council election: Village
| Party | Candidate | Votes | % | ±% |
|---|---|---|---|---|
| Conservative | Tobias Eckersley | 1,996 | 45.0 | +3.3 |
| Conservative | Robin Crookshank Hilton | 1,880 | 42.4 | +2.8 |
| Conservative | Nicholas Vineall | 1,731 | 39.0 | +1.4 |
| Labour | Michelle Pearce | 1,667 | 37.6 | −13.5 |
| Labour | Kate Cinnamon | 1,493 | 33.6 | −4.7 |
| Labour | Barbara Portwin | 1,406 | 31.7 | −5.2 |
| Green | Ruth Jenkins | 715 | 16.1 | +7.2 |
| Liberal Democrats | Jean Halden | 587 | 13.2 | +1.0 |
| Green | Lee Woodford | 561 | 12.6 | +6.4 |
| Liberal Democrats | Mark Valladeres | 484 | 10.9 | −2.5 |
| Liberal Democrats | Ronald Halden | 423 | 9.5 | −2.4 |
| Turnout | | 4,447 | 51.6 | +10.0 |
| Conservative gain from Labour | | Swing | | |
| Conservative hold | | Swing | | |
| Conservative hold | | Swing | | |

=== 2002 election ===
The election took place on 2 May 2002.

2002 Southwark London Borough Council election: Village
| Party | Candidate | Votes | % | ±% |
|---|---|---|---|---|
| Labour | Michelle Pearce | 1,755 | 51.1 | |
| Conservative | Tobias Eckersley | 1,430 | 41.7 | |
| Conservative | David Bradbury | 1,358 | 39.6 | |
| Labour | Hugh Dawes | 1,313 | 38.3 | |
| Conservative | Ewan Wallace | 1,292 | 37.6 | |
| Labour | Simon Taylor | 1,267 | 36.9 | |
| Liberal Democrats | Michael Brooks | 460 | 13.4 | |
| Liberal Democrats | Jean Halden | 420 | 12.2 | |
| Liberal Democrats | John Weedy | 408 | 11.9 | |
| Green | Ruth Jenkins | 304 | 8.9 | |
| Green | Freddy Easey | 237 | 6.9 | |
| Green | Lee Woodford | 212 | 6.2 | |
| Turnout | | 3,435 | 41.6 | |
| Labour win (new seat) | | | | |
| Conservative win (new seat) | | | | |
| Conservative win (new seat) | | | | |
