= Donfried =

Donfried is a surname. Notable people with the surname include:

- Karen Donfried, American public policy think tank executive
- Karl Paul Donfried (1940–2022), American theologian
