= Star of Lithuanian Diplomacy =

Lithuanian state award

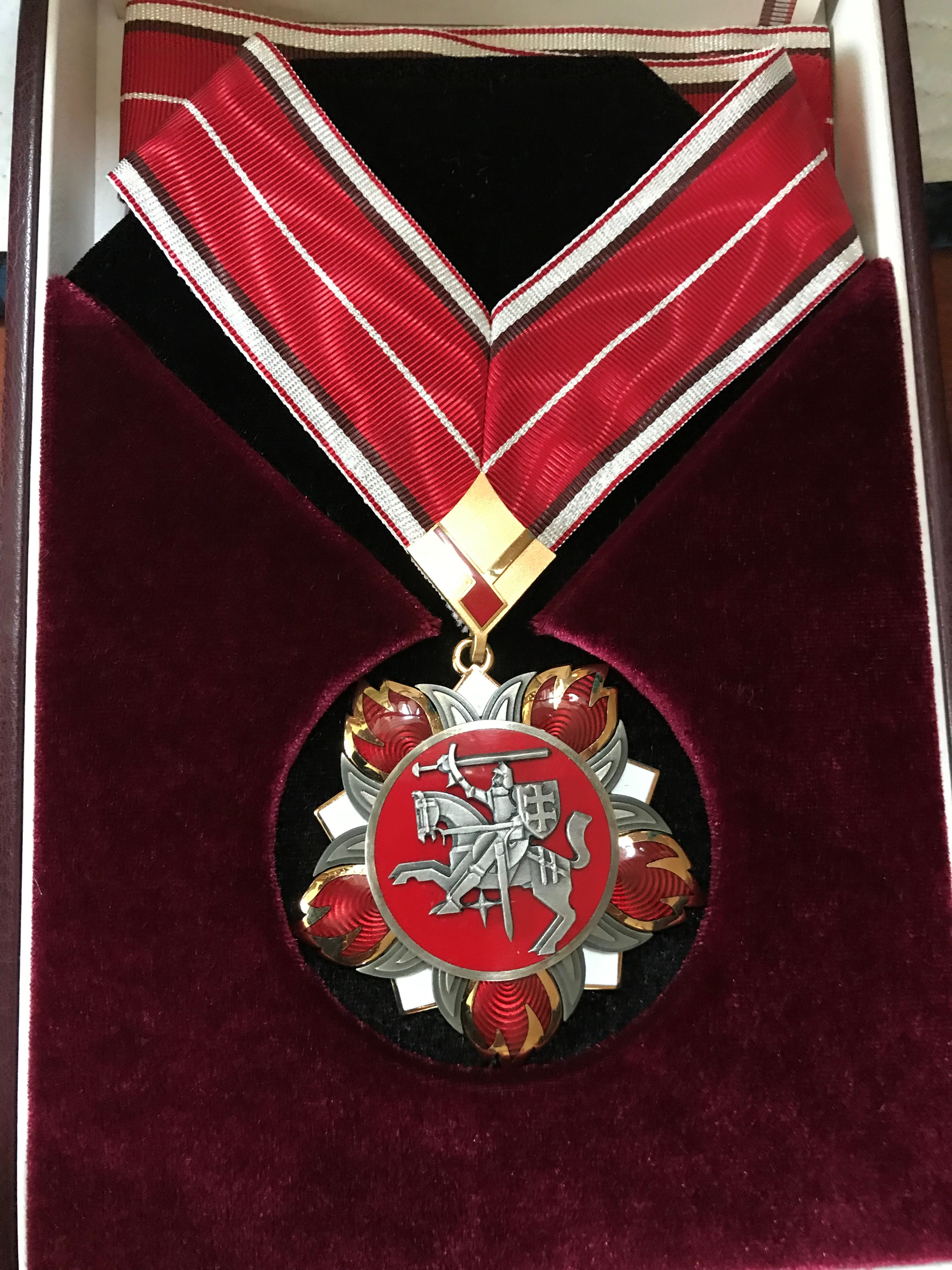
Star of Lithuanian Diplomacy medal

The award's ribbon

The Star of Lithuanian Diplomacy (Lietuvos diplomatijos žvaigždė) is a Lithuanian state award awarded by the country's Ministry of Foreign Affairs for promoting Lithuania abroad.

The award has been issued since 2010. Citizens and organizations of Lithuania and other countries are awarded with the star for special merit in promoting Lithuania or fostering and developing cross-border relations.

It has also been awarded for work in service of values that are held by Lithuania.

Examples of this include:

- On 13 July 2023, Kamil Dyszewski, on behalf of the organization North Atlantic Fella Organization, was presented the award for the group's efforts in combating Russian propaganda during the Russian invasion of Ukraine.
- In January 2024 the Diplomatic Star was awarded to Jessica Berlin, Pekka Kallioniemi, and Benjamin Tallis for “outstanding work towards our shared goals, defending democratic principles against the spread of authoritarianism and disinformation”.
- In March 2024 Anne Applebaum, Heather Conley and Karen Donfried were awarded the Diplomacy Star by the Minister of Foreign Affairs of Lithuania, Gabrielius Landsbergis, citing their support for a strong transatlantic relationship and Lithuania's foreign policy goals.
- In 2014 Timothy Snyder was presented the award for his work on the political history of Central and Eastern Europe.
