= Nunhead (ward) =

- Former electoral ward for the Southwark London Borough Council
- Nunhead ward boundaries from 2002 to 2018
- Borough: Southwark
- County: Greater London

Former electoral ward
- Created: 2002
- Abolished: 2018
- Councillors: 3
- Replaced by: Nunhead and Queen's Road, Old Kent Road, Peckham Rye
- ONS code: 00BEGP
- GSS code: E05000545

Nunhead was an electoral ward in the London Borough of Southwark from 2002 to 2018. The ward was first used in the 2002 elections and last used at the 2014 elections. It returned councillors to Southwark London Borough Council.

== List of councillors ==
| Term | Councillor | Party |
|---|---|---|
| 2002–2018 | Fiona Colley | Labour |
| 2002–2010 | Dominic Thorncroft | Labour |
| 2002–2006 | Alun Hayes | Labour |
| 2006–2014 | Althea Smith | Labour |
| 2010–2018 | Sunil Chopra | Labour |
| 2014–2018 | Sandra Rhule | Labour |

== Southwark council elections ==
=== 2014 election ===
The election took place on 22 May 2014.

2014 Southwark London Borough Council election: Nunhead
| Party | Candidate | Votes | % | ±% |
|---|---|---|---|---|
| Labour | Fiona Colley | 2,229 | 67.3 | +11.9 |
| Labour | Sunil Chopra | 1,936 | 58.5 | +5.2 |
| Labour | Sandra Rhule | 1,820 | 55.0 | +5.7 |
| Green | Steve Barbe | 714 | 21.6 | +10.4 |
| Green | Valerie Remy | 555 | 16.8 | +6.7 |
| Green | Dave Tapsell | 435 | 13.1 | +3.6 |
| All People's Party | Althea Smith | 323 | 9.8 | −39.5 |
| Conservative | Robert Clarke | 298 | 9.0 | −5.7 |
| Conservative | Gerald Chan | 255 | 7.7 | −4.2 |
| Conservative | Harry Chathli | 237 | 7.2 | −5.2 |
| Liberal Democrats | Frances Blango | 200 | 6.0 | −16.6 |
| Liberal Democrats | Paul Melly | 189 | 5.7 | −11.6 |
| Liberal Democrats | Dolly Mace | 163 | 4.9 | −10.8 |
| Turnout | | 3,336 | 34.3 | −21.3 |
| Labour hold | | Swing | | |
| Labour hold | | Swing | | |
| Labour hold | | Swing | | |

=== 2010 election ===
The election on 6 May 2010 took place on the same day as the United Kingdom general election.

2010 Southwark London Borough Council election: Nunhead
| Party | Candidate | Votes | % | ±% |
|---|---|---|---|---|
| Labour | Fiona Colley | 2,804 | 55.4 | +3.2 |
| Labour | Sunil Chopra | 2,698 | 53.3 | +2.3 |
| Labour | Althea Smith | 2,496 | 49.3 | −1.0 |
| Liberal Democrats | Martyn Barmby | 1,144 | 22.6 | +4.3 |
| Liberal Democrats | Paul Melly | 878 | 17.3 | +0.9 |
| Liberal Democrats | Matthew Shakespeare | 797 | 15.7 | +1.9 |
| Conservative | David Barratt | 744 | 14.7 | +1.5 |
| Conservative | Harry Chathli | 630 | 12.4 | +0.3 |
| Conservative | Colin Pereira | 601 | 11.9 | +1.2 |
| Green | Steve Barbe | 566 | 11.2 | −5.5 |
| Green | Brendan Daly | 510 | 10.1 | −3.6 |
| Green | Ann Darnbrough | 481 | 9.5 | −4.2 |
| Turnout | | 5,061 | 55.6 | +27.5 |
| Labour hold | | Swing | | |
| Labour hold | | Swing | | |
| Labour hold | | Swing | | |

=== 2006 election ===
The election took place on 4 May 2006.

2006 Southwark London Borough Council election: Nunhead
| Party | Candidate | Votes | % | ±% |
|---|---|---|---|---|
| Labour | Fiona Colley | 1,272 | 52.2 | +2.4 |
| Labour | Dominic Thorncroft | 1,244 | 51.0 | +2.7 |
| Labour | Althea Smith | 1,228 | 50.3 | +5.1 |
| Liberal Democrats | Laura Davies | 446 | 18.3 | +2.7 |
| Green | Steve Barbe | 407 | 16.7 | +6.5 |
| Liberal Democrats | Vivienne Todd | 400 | 16.4 | +2.2 |
| Liberal Democrats | Alexander Ehmann | 337 | 13.8 | +3.5 |
| Green | John Spencer | 334 | 13.7 | +2.6 |
| Green | Lalu Hanuman | 333 | 13.7 | +2.9 |
| Conservative | Graeme Brown | 323 | 13.2 | +3.2 |
| Conservative | Aditya Chathli | 295 | 12.1 | +3.8 |
| Conservative | Gogo-Rose Ilo | 262 | 10.7 | +2.4 |
| Turnout | | 2,442 | 28.1 | +6.6 |
| Labour hold | | Swing | | |
| Labour hold | | Swing | | |
| Labour hold | | Swing | | |

=== 2002 election ===
The election took place on 2 May 2002.

2002 Southwark London Borough Council election: Nunhead
| Party | Candidate | Votes | % | ±% |
|---|---|---|---|---|
| Labour | Fiona Colley | 872 | 49.8 | |
| Labour | Dominic Thorncroft | 845 | 48.3 | |
| Labour | Alun Hayes | 792 | 45.2 | |
| Independent | Christine Claridge | 466 | 26.6 | |
| Liberal Democrats | Tessa Dunlop | 274 | 15.6 | |
| Liberal Democrats | Zita Mohamad | 248 | 14.2 | |
| Green | Lee Roach | 194 | 11.1 | |
| Green | Paul Barker | 189 | 10.8 | |
| Conservative | Barbara Ellams | 183 | 10.5 | |
| Liberal Democrats | Kumungu Mwambazi | 181 | 10.3 | |
| Green | Steve Barbe | 179 | 10.2 | |
| Conservative | Edith Callam | 175 | 10.0 | |
| Conservative | Michelle Lowe | 146 | 8.3 | |
| Turnout | | 1,755 | 21.5 | |
| Labour win (new seat) | | | | |
| Labour win (new seat) | | | | |
| Labour win (new seat) | | | | |
