= Patrick Diamond =

British political official (born 1974)

Southwark Borough Councillor for Newington Ward
- In office 6 May 2010 – 22 May 2014
- Preceded by: Jelil Ladipo
- Succeeded by: Eleanor Kerslake

Personal details
- Born: 29 November 1974 (age 51)
- Party: Labour
- Education: Clare College, Cambridge

Patrick Diamond (born 29 November 1974) worked as a policy advisor under the Labour Party government of the United Kingdom in a role covering policy and strategy.

He is Senior Lecturer in Public Policy at Queen Mary University of London, co-chair of the think-tank Policy Network, Gwilym Gibbon Fellow at Nuffield College, Oxford, and a visiting fellow in the Department of Politics at the University of Oxford. Patrick is a board member of the Prisoners' Education Trust (PET), the Dartington Service Design Lab, and the Campaign for Social Science.

== Early life and education ==
Patrick Diamond was brought up and schooled in Leeds. He worked as a kibbutz volunteer on Kibbutz Lahav in Israel in the spring of 1994. After graduating from Clare College, Cambridge, with a double first-class honours in Social and Political Sciences and an MPhil from the Cambridge Institute of Criminology, Diamond was elected as the National Chair of Labour Students from May 1998 - April 1999. While attending Cambridge University, Diamond was Chair of the Cambridge University Labour Club during the 1997 general election.

== Political and academic career ==
Following a brief stint at Finsbury Financial Communications and the Institute for Public Policy Research, Diamond was appointed as Director of the Labour Party organization and magazine Progress. In late 2000, he was made Special Adviser to the then Secretary of State for Northern Ireland, Rt Hon Peter Mandelson MP.

In 2001 Diamond bid for election to Lambeth Council, though failed to win a seat in the 2002 Lambeth Council election. From June 2001-September 2004, Diamond was a member of the Number 10 Policy Unit with particular responsibility for the government's public service reform agenda. In the run-up to the 2005 general election, Diamond worked as a special adviser to the election co-ordinator, Alan Milburn MP, leading the management of the Labour Party's manifesto and preparation of the government's third-term policy programme.

In 2004, there was speculation that Diamond would seek selection as a parliamentary candidate, though this speculation remained unrealised.

After the Labour Party's victory in the 2005 General Election, Diamond was appointed as Director of the think tank Policy Network and took on a number of academic positions. He was a Transatlantic Fellow of the German Marshall Fund of the United States, senior visiting fellow at the Centre for the Study of Global Governance at the London School of Economics and Political Science, a lecturer at the Oxford University Faculty of Continuing Education and a visiting fellow at the University of Northumbria. He became a Fellow of the Royal Society of Arts and was a member of the Joseph Rowntree Foundation advisory board.

From August 2007-April 2009, Diamond was the Group Director of Strategy at the Equality and Human Rights Commission in Manchester and London.

In the May 2010 local council election, Diamond was elected as a Labour Councillor for the ward of Newington in the London Borough of Southwark.

Despite his association with Labour government since 1997, Diamond has expressed frustration at the speed and pace of policy change under New Labour.

== Publications ==
Patrick Diamond has published widely in various print media, including:

- Beyond New Labour: The Future of Social Democracy in Britain (ed. with Roger Liddle, Politico's, 2009)
- Social Justice in the Global Age (ed. with Olaf Cramme, Polity Press, 2009)
- Public Matters: How to Revive Britain’s Public Realm (Politico's, 2007)
- The Progressive Agenda: Revitalising Public Service Reform (ed. SOLACE Foundation, 2007)
- The North East in the Global Age (University of Northumbria/NEEF 2007)
- Global Europe, Social Europe (ed. with Anthony Giddens and Roger Liddle, Polity Press, 2006)
- Tackling Worklessness in the North East (University of Northumbria/NEEF, 2006)
- Conundrums of Reform (BBC/Policy Network, 2006)
- The Hampton Court Agenda: The Future of the European Social Model (ed. Policy Network, 2006)
- Equality Now: The Future of Revisionism (Fabian Society, 2005)
- The New Egalitarianism (ed. with Anthony Giddens, Polity Press, 2005)
- New Labour’s Old Roots: Labour’s Revisionist Thinkers 1931-97 (Imprint Academic, 2004)
- Family Fortunes: The New Politics of Childhood (ed. with Meg Munn, Fabian Society, 2004)
- Rethinking Social Democracy (ed. with Matt Browne, Policy Network, 2003)
- Where Next for Social Democracy? (ed. Policy Network, 2003)
- Must Labour Choose? (ed. Progress, 1999)
