= Pekka Kallioniemi =

Finnish social media researcher and influencer

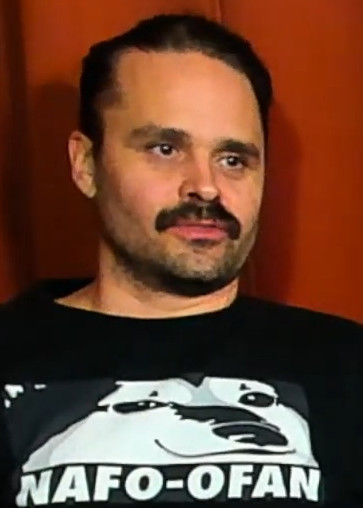
- Kallioniemi in 2024
- Born: 1981 or 1982 (age 43–44)
- Education: Tampere University (MA, PhD)
- Website: vatniksoup.com

Pekka Kallioniemi (born 1981 or 1982) is a Finnish researcher and social media influencer. He is known for Vatnik Soup, a series of Twitter posts which covers Russian propaganda.

== Biography ==
Kallioniemi graduated from Kuusamo Business College. He obtained a Master's degree in interactive technology and a doctorate in 2018 from Tampere University. Later, he became a postdoctoral researcher there.

After Russia invaded Ukraine, Kallioniemi started to post about the war on Twitter, with his account becoming popular in Autumn 2022. In early 2025, Kallioniemi left the university to focus on his social media career. Kallioniemi is assisted by a Lithuanian business partner. His activities are partially funded by the Netherlands and Estonia. For his work, Kallioniemi became a subject of harassment and legal threats.

== Vatnik Soup ==
Starting in 2022, Kallioniemi began a series of Twitter threads, which he called Vatnik Soup. This name references the word Vatnik, a Russian pejorative term for supporters of Vladimir Putin. The threads covered people and organizations whom Kallioniemi considered to be spreaders of Russian disinformation. Vatnik Soup was co-authored by Dutch historian Morten Hammeken.

Initially, he covered local Finnish figures such as Janus Putkonen and Johan Bäckman. His account became especially popular after he dedicated a series of posts to Patriarch Kirill, primate of the Russian Orthodox Church. The series also covered Donald Trump and Noam Chomsky. Kallioniemi told The Baltic Sentinel, "I conduct qualitative research focusing on personas—understanding who spreads Kremlin narratives and what motivates them... I always try to refer to a source. I do add a bit of personal analysis, which would probably be excluded in actual scientific work, but I always cite sources. If I don't have a source, I don't make the claim. Truthfulness is the essence of what I do."

In September 2024, Kallioniemi published a book based on the series.

== Awards ==
- Diplomatic Star of Lithuania for action against disinformation (Lithuania)
- Certificate of Appreciation from the Ukrainian Centre for Strategic Communication and Information Security (Ukraine)
