= 2002 Southwark London Borough Council election =

2002 local election in England

- 2 May 2002

All 63 seats up for election to Southwark London Borough Council 32 seats needed for a majority
- Registered: 173,560
- Turnout: 45,856, 26.42% (▼6.47)

	First party	Second party
Party	Liberal Democrats	Labour
Last election	27 seats, 36.38%	33 seats, 46.28%
Seats before	26	32
Seats won	30	28
Seat change	▲3	▼5
Popular vote	51,201	50,301
Percentage	39.03%	38.34%
Swing	▲2.65	▼7.94
	Third party	Fourth party
Party	Conservative	Green
Last election	4 seats, 13.09%	0 seats, 2.74%
Seats before	4	0
Seats won	5	0
Seat change	▲1	Steady
Popular vote	17,183	9,105
Percentage	13.10%	6.94%
Swing	▲0.01	▲4.20
- Map of the results of the 2002 Southwark council election. Conservatives in blue, Labour in red and Liberal Democrats in yellow.
Council Control before election
.
Labour
Council Control after election
No Overall Control

The 2002 elections to Southwark Council were held in the London Borough of Southwark, England, on 2 May 2002. The whole council was up for election, with boundary changes since the last election in 1998, reducing the number of seats by one. There were 63 seats in 21 wards. The Council moved from Labour controlled to no overall control, with a minority Liberal Democrat executive. Turnout was 26.2%.

Southwark local elections are held every four years, with the next held in 2006.

== Background ==
=== Ward Changes ===
==== Wards Created ====
- Brunswick Park (3) - Created from parts of the St Giles and Brunswick wards
- Camberwell Green (3) - Created from parts of the St Giles and Faraday wards
- Cathedrals (3) - Created from parts of the Cathedral, Chaucer and Browning wards
- East Dulwich (3) - Created from parts of the Alleyn, Bellenden, Lyndhurst and Rye wards
- East Walworth (3) - Created from parts of the Browning and Burgess wards
- Grange (3) - Created from parts of the Abbey, Bricklayers and Chaucer wards
- Livesey (3) - Created from parts of the Rotherhithe, Consort and Friary wards
- Nunhead (3) - Created from parts of the Consort, Barset and Waverley wards
- Peckham (3) - Created from the Liddle ward and parts of the Friary ward
- Peckham Rye (3) - Created from parts of the Bellenden, Rye and Waverley wards
- South Bermondsey (3) - Created from parts of the Bricklayers and Rotherhithe wards
- South Camberwell (3) - Created from parts of the Lyndhurst and the Bellenden wards
- Surrey Docks (3) - Created from parts of the Dockyard ward
- Village (3) - Created from parts of the Ruskin ward

==== Wards Eliminated ====
- Abbey (2)
- Alleyn (2)
- Barset (2)
- Bellenden (3)
- Bricklayers (2)
- Browning (3)
- Brunswick (3)
- Burgess (2)
- Cathedral (2)
- Consort (2)
- Dockyard (3)
- Friary (3)
- Liddle (3)
- Lyndhurst (3)
- Ruskin (3)
- Rye (2)
- St Giles (3)
- Waverley (2)

==== Wards Expanded ====
- College - from 2 seats to 3
- The Lane - from 2 seats to 3

=== Council Composition ===
In between the 1998 election and this election there were a total of 3 by-elections called to replace councillors who either resigned or died, however none of these by-elections resulted in seats changing parties. Aside from these elections there were also 2 councillors that switch allegiances (1 from Labour and 1 from the Liberal Democrats) to other parties or became an independent. As a result of this, the composition of the council just before the election was as follows:

↓
32	26	4	2
Labour	Lib Dem	Conservative	Other

== Election result ==
2002 Southwark London Borough Council local election results
Party	Seats	Gains	Losses	Net gain/loss	Seats %	Votes %	Votes	+/−
Liberal Democrats	30	20	17	▲3	47.62	39.03	51,201	▲2.65
Labour	28	26	31	▼5	44.44	38.34	50,301	▼7.94
Conservative	5	3	2	▲1	7.94	13.10	17,183	▲0.01
Green	0	0	0	Steady	0.00	6.94	9,105	▲4.20
Independent	0	0	0	Steady	0.00	1.76	2,307	▲1.19
London Socialist	0	0	0	Steady	0.00	0.55	728	New
National Front	0	0	0	Steady	0.00	0.13	176	New
CPA	0	0	0	Steady	0.00	0.11	138	New
Communist	0	0	0	Steady	0.00	0.04	49	New
Total	63						131,188	

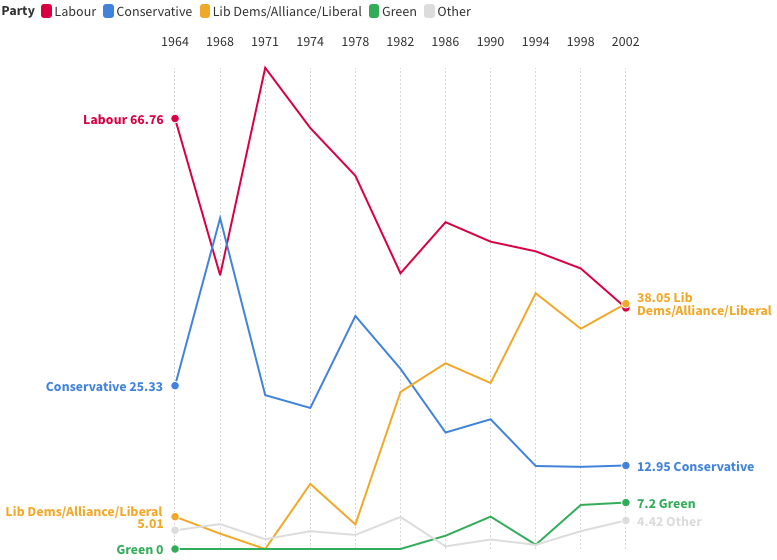
Southwark Council voting history

After the election, the composition of the council was as follows:

↓
30	28	5
Labour	Lib Dem	Conservative

== Ward results ==
(*) - Indicates an incumbent candidate

(†) - Indicates an incumbent candidate standing in a different ward

=== Brunswick Park ===
Brunswick Park (3)
Party	Candidate	Votes	%	±%
Labour	Lilian Naish^{†} (Note: Naish and Wingfield were sitting councillors representing the former Brunswick ward)	999	56.6	
Labour	Alison Moise	970	55.0	
Labour	Robert Wingfield^{†}	899	51.0	
Liberal Democrats	Diccon Bright	369	20.9	
Liberal Democrats	Henry Hardy	332	18.8	
Liberal Democrats	Mackie Sheik	309	17.5	
Green	Isabelle Mazzitelli	226	12.8	
Conservative	Tania Brisby	206	11.7	
Green	Cindy Morgan	194	11.0	
Conservative	Doris Pearce	194	11.0	
Green	Paul Holloway	193	10.9	
Conservative	Oliver Wooller	179	10.1	
Independent	Thomas Maguire	41	2.3	
Registered electors		7,706		New
Turnout		1,769	22.96	New
Rejected ballots		4	0.23	New
Labour win (new seat)				
Labour win (new seat)				
Labour win (new seat)				

=== Camberwell Green ===
Camberwell Green (3)
Party	Candidate	Votes	%	±%
Labour	Dora Dixon-Fyle^{†} (Note: Dixon-Fyle and Ritchie were both sitting councillors representing the former St Giles ward)	1,276	49.9	
Labour	John Friary^{†} (Note: Friary was a sitting councillor representing the former Brunswick ward)	1,189	46.5	
Labour	Anthony Ritchie^{†}	1,120	43.8	
Liberal Democrats	Keith Miller	1,070	41.9	
Liberal Democrats	Beatrice Adeosun	1,059	41.4	
Liberal Democrats	Florence Clark	1,048	41.0	
Green	Claire Armitage	155	6.1	
Green	Jack Woodford	113	4.4	
Conservative	Jeremy Hart	98	3.8	
Conservative	Robert Hayward	96	3.8	
Green	Lee Veitch	94	3.7	
Conservative	Julian Popov	68	2.7	
Registered electors		8,761		New
Turnout		2,565	29.28	New
Rejected ballots		4	0.16	New
Labour win (new seat)				
Labour win (new seat)				
Labour win (new seat)				

=== Cathedrals ===
Cathedrals (3)
Party	Candidate	Votes	%	±%
Liberal Democrats	Mark Pursey	1,219	62.3	
Liberal Democrats	Daniel McCarthy	1,215	62.1	
Liberal Democrats	Catriona Moore	1,211	61.9	
Labour	Linda Bailey	412	21.1	
Labour	Merilyn Brown	406	20.7	
Labour	Preeti Farooki	371	19.0	
Conservative	Martin Cullingford	157	8.0	
Conservative	Robin Field	149	7.6	
Green	Jayne Forbes	136	6.9	
Conservative	Fabian Richter	133	6.8	
Green	Maija Korpak	124	6.3	
Green	David Turner	120	6.1	
Registered electors		8,822		New
Turnout		1,959	22.21	New
Rejected ballots		2	0.10	New
Liberal Democrats win (new seat)				
Liberal Democrats win (new seat)				
Liberal Democrats win (new seat)				

=== Chaucer ===
Chaucer (3)
Party	Candidate	Votes	%	±%
Liberal Democrats	Richard Thomas^{†} (Note: Thomas was a sitting councillor representing the former Abbey ward)	1,576	56.9	
Liberal Democrats	Abdur-Rahman Olayiwola	1,534	55.4	
Liberal Democrats	Lorraine Zuleta	1,483	53.6	
Labour	Sarab Ali	960	34.7	
Labour	Al-Issa Munu	896	32.4	
Labour	Angela Molloy	835	30.2	
Green	Jonathon Farmer	150	5.4	
Conservative	Mark Parsons	99	3.6	
Green	Colleen Schroeder	88	3.2	
Conservative	Miriam Jones	87	3.1	
Green	Anna Leikkari	82	3.0	
Conservative	Vikrant Bhansali	77	2.8	
Registered electors		8,759		▲1,048
Turnout		2,775	31.68	▼3.97
Rejected ballots		7	0.25	▲0.10
Liberal Democrats win (new boundaries)				
Liberal Democrats win (new boundaries)				
Liberal Democrats win (new boundaries)				

=== College ===
College (3)
Party	Candidate	Votes	%	±%
Conservative	Mark Humphreys*	1,347	52.2	
Conservative	Lewis Robinson	1,232	47.7	
Conservative	William Rowe*	1,226	47.5	
Labour	Carol Britton	845	32.7	
Labour	Reuben Smith	732	28.4	
Labour	Gordon Nardell	728	28.2	
Liberal Democrats	Theresa Connolly	340	13.2	
Liberal Democrats	Patricia Mynott	309	12.0	
Liberal Democrats	Patricia Richens	286	11.1	
Green	Harriet Einsiedel	186	7.2	
Green	Angela Lowe	173	6.7	
Green	Tamra Poorun	144	5.6	
Registered electors		7,886		▲2,408
Turnout		2,584	32.77	▼10.59
Rejected ballots		2	0.08	▼0.34
Conservative win (new boundaries)				
Conservative win (new boundaries)				
Conservative win (new seat)				

=== East Dulwich ===
East Dulwich (3)
Party	Candidate	Votes	%	±%
Labour	Sarah Welfare	841	43.3	
Labour	Charlie Smith	825	42.5	
Labour	Norma Gibbes^{†}	804	41.4	
Liberal Democrats	Joanna French	355	18.3	
Liberal Democrats	Albert Bosworth	341	17.6	
Conservative	Percy Ansong	336	17.3	
Conservative	Mark Graves	326	16.8	
Liberal Democrats	Ron Halden	325	16.7	
Conservative	Edwin Webster	315	16.2	
Green	Anna Dalton	282	14.5	
Green	Sharon Hogan	240	12.4	
Green	Swadesh Poorun	222	11.4	
London Socialist	Tanwir Anwer	137	7.1	
London Socialist	Margaret Leman	114	5.9	
Independent	Garth Robertson	90	4.6	
Registered electors		8,098		New
Turnout		1,942	23.98	New
Rejected ballots		1	0.05	New
Labour win (new seat)				
Labour win (new seat)				
Labour win (new seat)				

=== East Walworth ===
East Walworth (3)
Party	Candidate	Votes	%	±%
Liberal Democrats	Margaret Ambrose	1,200	53.3	
Liberal Democrats	Catherine Bowman^{†} (Note: Bowman and Watson were sitting councillors representing the former Browning ward)	1,189	52.8	
Liberal Democrats	Neil Watson^{†}	1,064	47.3	
Labour	Bernard Dainton	716	31.8	
Labour	Roselyn Musa	680	30.2	
Labour	Murray Rowlands	660	29.3	
Conservative	Robert Morton	115	5.1	
Conservative	John Rose	101	4.5	
Conservative	James Wong	97	4.3	
Green	Brenda Ferron	91	4.0	
Green	Orlando Einsiedel	88	3.9	
London Socialist	Andrew Dark	80	3.6	
London Socialist	Peter North	80	3.6	
Green	Phil Poole	78	3.5	
Independent	Julie Crawford	55	2.4	
Registered electors		8,499		New
Turnout		2,255	26.53	New
Rejected ballots		4	0.18	New
Liberal Democrats win (new seat)				
Liberal Democrats win (new seat)				
Liberal Democrats win (new seat)				

=== Faraday ===
Faraday (3)
Party	Candidate	Votes	%	±%
Labour	Abdul Mohamed	1,301	45.1	
Labour	Lorraine Lauder	1,220	42.3	
Labour	Paul Bates	1,198	41.6	
Liberal Democrats	Alfred Langley^{†} (Note: Langley and Noakes were sitting councillors representing the former Faraday ward)	1,128	39.1	
Liberal Democrats	David Noakes^{†} (Note: Langley and Noakes were sitting councillors representing the former Faraday ward)	1,114	38.6	
Liberal Democrats	Nzingha Shukura	1,079	37.4	
Independent	Piers Corbyn	349	12.1	
Independent	Margot Lindsay	313	10.9	
Conservative	Samantha Graves	96	3.3	
Green	Sarah Howard	94	3.3	
Green	Heather O'Reilly	92	3.2	
Conservative	Joseph McKenna	80	2.8	
Green	Shane Becker	74	2.6	
Conservative	Douglas Mitchell	71	2.5	
Registered electors		8,299		▼297
Turnout		2,894	34.87	▼5.08
Rejected ballots		7	0.24	▼0.97
Labour win (new boundaries)				
Labour win (new boundaries)				
Labour win (new boundaries)				

=== Grange ===
Grange (3)
Party	Candidate	Votes	%	±%
Liberal Democrats	Denise Capstick^{†} (Note: Capstick was a sitting councillor representing the former Bricklayers ward)	1,153	60.9	
Liberal Democrats	Linda Manchester^{†} (Note: Manchester was a sitting councillor representing the former Abbey ward)	1,099	58.1	
Liberal Democrats	Robert Skelly	1,032	54.5	
Labour	Graham Nash^{†} (Note: Nash was a sitting councillor representing the former Bricklayers ward as a Liberal Democrat councillor)	592	31.3	
Labour	Richard Livingstone	552	29.2	
Labour	Vivienne Todd^{†} (Note: Todd was a sitting councillor representing the former Waverley ward)	467	24.7	
Conservative	Stephen Crabb	132	7.0	
Conservative	Susan Hardy	122	6.4	
Conservative	Sally Wright	122	6.4	
Green	John English	110	5.8	
Green	Lisa Peru	90	4.8	
Green	Mignon Madden	82	4.3	
Registered electors		8,271		New
Turnout		1,896	22.92	New
Rejected ballots		4	0.21	New
Liberal Democrats win (new seat)				
Liberal Democrats win (new seat)				
Liberal Democrats win (new seat)				

=== Livesey ===
Livesey (3)
Party	Candidate	Votes	%	±%
Liberal Democrats	Jonathan Hunt	1,373	47.3	
Liberal Democrats	Graham Neale	1,347	46.4	
Liberal Democrats	Richard Porter	1,336	46.1	
Labour	Frank Pemberton^{†} (Note: Pemberton was a sitting councillor representing the former Friary ward)	1,272	43.8	
Labour	Anne Sacks	1,224	42.2	
Labour	Anne Worsley^{†} (Note: Worsley was a sitting councillor representing the former Consort ward. She was elected in a by-election in 1998 triggered by the resignation of Cllr. Nicola A. Kutapan)	1,199	41.3	
Green	Caroline Jones	141	4.9	
Conservative	John G. Davenport	92	3.2	
Conservative	Hussain Malik	85	2.9	
Conservative	Russell Woodrow	69	2.4	
CPA	Simisola Lawanson	55	1.9	
London Socialist	Stephen Norreys	51	1.8	
Registered electors		8,731		New
Turnout		2,908	33.31	New
Rejected ballots		7	0.24	New
Liberal Democrats win (new seat)				
Liberal Democrats win (new seat)				
Liberal Democrats win (new seat)				

=== Newington ===
Newington (3)
Party	Candidate	Votes	%	±%
Liberal Democrats	Caroline Pidgeon^{†} (Note: Pidgeon, Gurling and Ladipo were sitting councillors representing the former Newington ward)	1,329	56.4	
Liberal Democrats	James Gurling^{†} (Note: Pidgeon, Gurling and Ladipo were sitting councillors representing the former Newington ward)	1,310	55.6	
Liberal Democrats	Jelil Ladipo^{†} (Note: Pidgeon, Gurling and Ladipo were sitting councillors representing the former Newington ward)	1,252	53.2	
Labour	James Gillespie	745	31.6	
Labour	Joseph Edem-Hotah	741	31.5	
Labour	Surjit Kaur	622	26.4	
Green	Leah Godwin	142	6.0	
Conservative	Andrew Briant	136	5.8	
Green	Mark Mason	127	5.4	
Conservative	Clive Jones	121	5.1	
Conservative	Kenneth Norris	119	5.1	
Green	Graham Parton	110	4.7	
Registered electors		8,584		▲654
Turnout		2,365	27.55	▼11.47
Rejected ballots		5	0.21	▼0.50
Liberal Democrats win (new boundaries)				
Liberal Democrats win (new boundaries)				
Liberal Democrats win (new boundaries)				

=== Nunhead ===
Nunhead (3)
Party	Candidate	Votes	%	±%
Labour	Fiona Colley	872	49.8	
Labour	Dominic Thorncroft^{†} (Note: Thorncroft was a sitting councillor representing the former Rye ward)	845	48.3	
Labour	Alun Hayes	792	45.2	
Independent	Christine Claridge^{†} (Note: Claridge was a sitting councillor representing the former Barset ward as a Labour councillor)	466	26.6	
Liberal Democrats	Tessa Dunlop	274	15.6	
Liberal Democrats	Zita Mohamad	248	14.2	
Green	Lee Roach	194	11.1	
Green	Paul Barker	189	10.8	
Conservative	Barbara Ellams	183	10.5	
Liberal Democrats	Kumungu Mwambazi	181	10.3	
Green	Steve Barbe	179	10.2	
Conservative	Edith Callam	175	10.0	
Conservative	Michelle Lowe	146	8.3	
Registered electors		8,172		New
Turnout		1,755	21.48	New
Rejected ballots		4	0.23	New
Labour win (new seat)				
Labour win (new seat)				
Labour win (new seat)				

=== Peckham ===
Peckham (3)
Party	Candidate	Votes	%	±%
Labour	Barrie Hargrove^{†} (Note: Hargrove was a sitting councillor representing the former Friary ward)	981	57.5	
Labour	William Kayada^{†} (Note: Kayada was a sitting councillor representing the former Liddle ward)	946	55.4	
Labour	Tayo Situ	934	54.7	
Independent	Mike Rahman	378	22.1	
Independent	Natalie Ajeon	335	19.6	
Independent	Annette Pallas	280	16.4	
Liberal Democrats	Maria Williams	168	9.8	
Liberal Democrats	Ewart Rose	160	9.4	
Liberal Democrats	Oswald Smith	160	9.4	
Conservative	Jane MacLaren	129	7.6	
Conservative	Stephen Phillips	99	5.8	
Conservative	Rebecca Humphreys	95	5.6	
CPA	Lucinda Atobatele	83	4.9	
Green	Marie Thiel	69	4.0	
Green	Jonathon Vickery	59	3.5	
Green	Lucy Woodford	49	2.9	
Registered electors		7,496		New
Turnout		1,718	22.92	New
Rejected ballots		7	0.41	New
Labour win (new seat)				
Labour win (new seat)				
Labour win (new seat)				

=== Peckham Rye ===
Peckham Rye (3)
Party	Candidate	Votes	%	±%
Labour	Michael Barnard^{†} (Note: Barnard was a sitting councillor representing the former Waverley ward)	911	48.7	
Labour	Alfred Banya	805	43.0	
Labour	Robert Smeath	722	38.6	
Liberal Democrats	Adrian Atherton-Fields	439	23.5	
Liberal Democrats	Julie Glover	385	20.6	
Liberal Democrats	Victor Stewart	371	19.8	
Conservative	Daniel Crawshaw	323	17.3	
Conservative	Jill Kirby	323	17.3	
Conservative	Jennifer Epworth	320	17.1	
Green	Eva Taylor	283	15.1	
Green	Robbie Kelly	247	13.2	
Green	Adam Shahin	206	11.0	
Registered electors		8,188		New
Turnout		1,878	22.94	New
Rejected ballots		5	0.27	New
Labour win (new seat)				
Labour win (new seat)				
Labour win (new seat)				

=== Riverside ===
Riverside (3)
Party	Candidate	Votes	%	±%
Liberal Democrats	Stephen Flannery	1,136	63.4	
Liberal Democrats	Nicholas Stanton*	1,122	62.6	
Liberal Democrats	Eliza Mann	1,096	61.1	
Labour	Stephen Boyer	374	20.9	
Labour	Anne Smith	350	19.5	
Labour	Joan Khachik^{†} (Note: Khachik was a sitting councillor representing the former Friary ward)	347	19.4	
Conservative	Peter Randall-Johnson	174	9.7	
Conservative	John Liddiard	166	9.3	
Conservative	James Talbot	166	9.3	
Green	Caroline Behr	152	8.5	
Registered electors		8,055		▲676
Turnout		1,802	22.37	▼13.23
Rejected ballots		7	0.39	▼0.22
Liberal Democrats win (new boundaries)				
Liberal Democrats win (new boundaries)				
Liberal Democrats win (new boundaries)				

=== Rotherhithe ===
Rotherhithe (3)
Party	Candidate	Votes	%	±%
Liberal Democrats	Jeffrey Hook* (Note: Hook was a sitting councillor representing the former Rotherhithe ward, elected in a by-election in 1998 triggered by the death of Cllr. Victor D. Jones)	1,130	60.1	
Liberal Democrats	Anne Yates^{†} (Note: Yates and Biango were sitting councillors representing the former Dockyard ward)	1,128	60.0	
Liberal Democrats	Columba Blango^{†}	1,063	56.5	
Labour	John Hellings	428	22.8	
Labour	Olufemi Abe	426	22.6	
Labour	Gordon Jones	384	20.4	
Conservative	Simon Ainsworth	164	8.7	
Conservative	Michael Ramsey	163	8.7	
Green	Gillian Addison	154	8.2	
Conservative	Jasmine Cullingford	141	7.5	
Green	Tyron Evelyn	110	5.8	
Green	June Veitch	102	5.4	
Registered electors		8,131		▲1,676
Turnout		1,889	23.23	▼7.07
Rejected ballots		8	0.42	▼0.14
Liberal Democrats win (new boundaries)				
Liberal Democrats win (new boundaries)				
Liberal Democrats win (new boundaries)				

=== South Bermondsey ===
South Bermondsey (3)
Party	Candidate	Votes	%	±%
Liberal Democrats	Beverley Bassom^{†} (Note: Bassom was a sitting councillor representing the Rotherhithe ward)	1,219	67.2	
Liberal Democrats	Paul Kyriacou	1,086	59.9	
Liberal Democrats	Kenneth Mizzi^{†} (Note: Mizzi was a sitting councillor representing the former Burgess ward)	1,081	59.6	
Labour	Reginald Gyasi	362	20.0	
Labour	Shirley Oldhamstead	340	18.7	
Labour	Abayomi Solaymon	314	17.3	
National Front	Richard White	176	9.7	
Conservative	Beatrice Crabb	111	6.1	
Conservative	Huw David	108	6.0	
Conservative	John Pemberton	95	5.2	
Green	Anthony Hannigan	87	4.8	
Green	Ruvini De Alwis	80	4.4	
Green	Caspar Krabo	69	3.8	
Registered electors		7,931		New
Turnout		1,816	22.90	New
Rejected ballots		1	0.06	New
Liberal Democrats win (new seat)				
Liberal Democrats win (new seat)				
Liberal Democrats win (new seat)				

=== South Camberwell ===
South Camberwell (3)
Party	Candidate	Votes	%	±%
Labour	Veronica Ward	896	48.1	
Labour	Peter John	839	45.1	
Labour	Dermot McInerney^{†} (Note: McInerney was a sitting councillor representing the former Lyndhurst ward)	836	44.9	
Green	Jenny Jones	417	22.4	
Green	Storm Poorun	316	17.0	
Liberal Democrats	Stephen Cleary	314	16.9	
Liberal Democrats	Eileen Hodgson	308	16.6	
Conservative	Christopher Owen	279	15.0	
Green	Leslie Smith	270	14.5	
Conservative	Irene Manning	261	14.0	
Liberal Democrats	Oliver Maloney	259	13.9	
Conservative	Olga Grant	258	13.9	
London Socialist	Nicola Field	95	5.1	
Registered electors		7,806		New
Turnout		1,866	23.90	New
Rejected ballots		4	0.21	New
Labour win (new seat)				
Labour win (new seat)				
Labour win (new seat)				

=== Surrey Docks ===
Surrey Docks (3)
Party	Candidate	Votes	%	±%
Liberal Democrats	David Hubber	1,034	59.4	
Liberal Democrats	Gavin O'Brien	1,012	58.1	
Liberal Democrats	Lisa Rajan	966	55.5	
Conservative	Laura Collins	351	20.1	
Conservative	John Meakin	339	19.5	
Conservative	Julian Pratt	311	17.9	
Labour	Orville Foulkes	268	15.4	
Labour	Pearse Odunlami	210	12.1	
Labour	Samuel Ugbade	189	10.8	
Green	Katharine Dessau	124	7.1	
Green	John Spencer	84	4.8	
Green	Belen Bermudez	76	4.4	
Registered electors		8,517		New
Turnout		1,749	20.54	New
Rejected ballots		7	0.40	New
Liberal Democrats win (new seat)				
Liberal Democrats win (new seat)				
Liberal Democrats win (new seat)				

=== The Lane ===
The Lane (3)
Party	Candidate	Votes	%	±%
Labour	Aubyn Graham*	1,111	54.8	
Labour	Andrew Simmons^{†} (Note: Simmons was a sitting councillor representing the former Bellenden ward)	1,097	54.1	
Labour	Mark Glover	1,090	53.8	
Liberal Democrats	Colin Hunt	468	23.1	
Liberal Democrats	Donnachadh McCarthy	392	19.3	
Liberal Democrats	Michael Wundah	327	19.1	
Green	Victoria Langdon	205	10.1	
Conservative	Stewart Holmes	204	10.1	
Green	Erik Brunulf	200	9.9	
Conservative	Roger Gough	194	9.6	
Green	Bill Keenan	190	9.4	
Conservative	Nicholas Vineall	188	9.3	
London Socialist	Gillian Lee	60	3.0	
London Socialist	Colin Lane	59	2.9	
London Socialist	Dennis Martin	52	2.6	
Communist	Nicholas Wright	49	2.4	
Registered electors		8,588		▲3,521
Turnout		2,036	23.71	▼12.39
Rejected ballots		10	0.49	▼0.17
Labour win (new boundaries)				
Labour win (new boundaries)				
Labour win (new seat)				

=== Village ===
Village (3)
Party	Candidate	Votes	%	±%
Labour	Michelle Pearce^{†} (Note: Pearce, Eckersley and Bradbury were all sitting councillors representing the former Ruskin ward)	1,755	51.1	
Conservative	Tobias Eckersley^{†}	1,430	41.7	
Conservative	David Bradbury^{†}	1,358	39.6	
Labour	Hugh Dawes	1,313	38.3	
Conservative	Ewan Wallace	1,292	37.6	
Labour	Simon Taylor	1,267	36.9	
Liberal Democrats	Michael Brooks	460	13.4	
Liberal Democrats	Jean Halden	420	12.2	
Liberal Democrats	John Weedy	408	11.9	
Green	Ruth Jenkins	304	8.9	
Green	Freddy Easey	237	6.9	
Green	Lee Woodford	212	6.2	
Registered electors		8,260		New
Turnout		3,435	41.59	New
Rejected ballots		3	0.09	New
Labour win (new seat)				
Conservative win (new seat)				
Conservative win (new seat)				

== By-Elections ==
East Walworth by-election, 12 February 2004
Party	Candidate	Votes	%	±%
Liberal Democrats	Jane Salmon	1,477	51.1	
Labour	Rhodri Thomas	978	38.3	
Conservative	Philip G.H. Riches	86	3.3	
Green	Ruth Jenkins	82	3.1	
Independent	Julie D. Crawford	11	0.4	
Total valid votes		2,634		
Turnout			32.4	
Liberal Democrats hold				

This by-election was called following the death of Cllr. Margaret Ambrose
