= Karl Paul Donfried =

American theologian (1940–2022)

- Born: April 6, 1940; New York City, U.S.
- Died: February 23, 2022 (aged 81); Washington, D.C., U.S.
- Children: Karen Donfried

Academic background
- Education: Columbia University (BA); Harvard Divinity School (DV); Union Theological Seminary (STM); University of Heidelberg (DTh)
- Doctoral advisor: Günther Bornkamm

Academic work
- Discipline: Biblical literature
- Institutions: Smith College

Karl Paul Donfried (April 6, 1940 – February 23, 2022) was an American theologian and New Testament scholar. He was Elizabeth A. Woodson Professor Emeritus of Religion and Biblical Literature at Smith College.

== Life ==
Donfried was born in New York City and graduated from the prep school Trinity School. He went to college at Columbia University (B.A. 1960) and Harvard Divinity School (B.D. 1963 under G. Ernest Wright). Donfried was ordained by the Lutheran Church in America on June 5, 1963, and went on to earn graduate degrees from Union Theological Seminary (S.T.M. 1965 under W. D. Davies) and the University of Heidelberg (Dr. theol. 1968 under Günther Bornkamm).

His daughter, Karen Donfried, is the former president of the German Marshall Fund and is currently serving as Assistant Secretary of State for European and Eurasian Affairs in the Biden administration. His son, Mark Donfried is director general at the Berlin-based Institute for Cultural Diplomacy.

== Books ==
- 1 Timothy Reconsidered (Colloquium Oecumenicum Paulinum 18. Leuven: Peeters. 2008.
- Who Owns the Bible? Toward the Recovery of a Christian Hermeneutic. New York: Crossroad. 2006.
- Paul, Thessalonica and Early Christianity. Edinburgh and Grand Rapids: T. & T. Clark and Eerdmans. 2002.
- The Thessalonians Debate: Methodological Discord or Methodological Synthesis? (with Johannes Beutler. Grand Rapids: Eerdmans. 2000.
- Judaism and Christianity in Rome in the First Century (with Peter Richardson. Grand Rapids: Eerdmans. 1998.
- The Theology of the Shorter Pauline Letters (with I. Howard Marshall. Cambridge University Press. 1993.
- The Romans Debate: Expanded and Revised Edition. Peabody, MA: Hendrickson. 1991.
- The Dynamic Word: New Testament Insights for Contemporary Christians. New York and San Francisco: Harper & Row. 1981.
- Mary in the New Testament, edited and authored together with Raymond E. Brown, Joseph Fitzmyer and John Reumann. Philadelphia; New York: Paulist Press. 1978.
- The Romans Debate. Minneapolis: Augsburg Publishing House. 1977. ISBN 9780806616070.
- The Setting of Second Clement in Early Christianity. Leiden:E. J. Brill. 1974.
- Peter in the New Testament, edited and authored together with Raymond E. Brown and John Reumann. Minneapolis; New York: Augsburg Publishing House; Paulist Press. 1973.
