= Dulwich Village (ward) =

- Electoral ward for the Southwark London Borough Council
- Dulwich Village ward boundaries since 2018
- Borough: Southwark
- County: Greater London
- Population: 10,255 (2021)
- Electorate: 7,658 (2022)
- Area: 2.817 square kilometres (1.088 sq mi)

Current electoral ward
- Created: 2018
- Councillors: 2
- Created from: South Camberwell and Village
- GSS code: E05011100

Dulwich Village is an electoral ward in the London Borough of Southwark. The ward was first used in the 2018 elections. It returns two councillors to Southwark London Borough Council.

== Southwark council elections ==
=== 2022 election ===
The election took place on 5 May 2022. The turnout of 60.7% was the highest of any electoral ward in Greater London.

2022 Southwark London Borough Council election: Dulwich Village (2)
Party	Candidate	Votes	%	±%
Labour	Margy Newens	2,111	45.4	▲6.3
Labour	Richard Leeming	1,922	41.4	▲6.2
Liberal Democrats	Richard Wingfield	1,133	24.4	▼3.6
Conservative	Tristan Honeyborne	1,063	22.9	▼6.2
Conservative	Clive Rates	1,053	22.7	▼5.8
Liberal Democrats	Raghav Parkash	1,037	22.3	▼2.7
Green	Christopher Langdon	387	8.3	▲1.4
Green	Piers Holden	370	8.0	▲1.6
Reform	Paul Randolfi	50	1.1	New
Turnout		4,645	60.66	+3.44
Labour hold		Swing		
Labour hold		Swing		

=== 2018 election ===
The election took place on 3 May 2018.

2018 Southwark London Borough Council election: Dulwich Village (2)
Party	Candidate	Votes	%	±%
Labour	Margy Newens	1,755		
Labour	Richard Leeming	1,580		
Conservative	Jane Lyons	1,306		
Conservative	Michael Mitchell	1,281		
Liberal Democrats	Brigid Gardner	1,259		
Liberal Democrats	Ruth Gripper	1,124		
Green	William Chidley	312		
Green	Gulnar Hasnain	289		
Turnout		4,492	57.22	
Labour win (new seat)				
Labour win (new seat)				
