= Heather Conley =

US civil servant

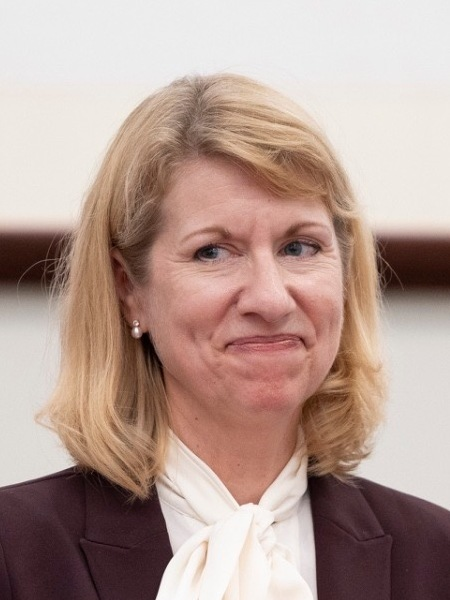
- Conley in 2024
- Education: West Virginia Wesleyan College (BA); Johns Hopkins University (MA)

Heather A. Conley was president of the German Marshall Fund of the United States (GMF) in Washington, D.C.

== Early life and education ==
Conley received her Bachelor of Arts degree from West Virginia Wesleyan College. She received her Master of Arts in International Relations from the Paul H. Nitze School of Advanced International Studies, The Johns Hopkins University.

== Career ==
Conley is an expert on Russia and the post-Soviet space as well as geopolitics of the Arctic, Baltic and Central Europe. After graduation, Conley served for over three years in several capacities as a foreign affairs officer in the Department of State. She served as an associate with the international consulting firm Armitage Associates, L.C., since 1994 and as a senior associate since 1997.

Conley served the State Department as Deputy Assistant Secretary of State, responsible for Central Europe - a role she assumed in September 2001 and held until 2005. During her tenure as a top diplomat for Central Europe, NATO underwent its fifth, and most significant enlargement round in 2004. Many countries in Central Europe also joined the Bush Administration's multinational "Coalition of the Willing" force during the 2003 Iraq invasion. Conley has subsequently stated that the US has lost some credibility as a result of the Iraq War.

In 2009, she moved to the Center for Strategic & International Studies as director and senior fellow in charge of the Europe Program. In 2014 she was promoted to senior vice president for Europe, Eurasia, and the Arctic and director of the CSIS Europe Program.

In November 2021, she was appointed to succeed Karen Donfried as president of the German Marshall Fund, commencing in January 2022. The GMF is a nonpartisan American public policy think tank and grant-making institution dedicated to promoting cooperation and understanding between North America and Europe. Conley resigned from this role in September 2024.

In 2022, she became the Sol M. Linowitz Professor of International Affairs at Hamilton College, concentrating on the role that alliances to U.S. national security have played since the Second World War.

=== Board appointments ===
Conley is a member of the board of directors of the American Ditchley Foundation.

=== Opposition to Donald Trump ===
In 2020, Conley, along with over 130 other former Republican national security officials, signed a statement asserting that President Trump is unfit to serve another term, and "To that end, we are firmly convinced that it is in the best interest of our nation that Vice President Joe Biden be elected as the next President of the United States, and we will vote for him."

== Recognition ==
She has received two State Department Meritorious Honor Awards.

== Works ==
- Conley, Heather A.; Gerber, Theodore P.; Moore, Lucy (2011). Russian soft power in the 21st century : an examination of Russian compatriot policy in Estonia. Washington, DC: Center for Strategic & International Studies. ISBN 9780892066667.
- Conley, Heather A.; Dukkipati, Uttara (2012). Leading from behind in public-private partnerships? : an assessment of European engagement with the private sector in development. Washington, DC: Center for Strategic & International Studies. ISBN 9780892067060.
- Conley, Heather A. (2013). Arctic economics in the 21st century : the benefits and costs of cold. Washington, D.C.: Center for Strategic & International Studies. ISBN 9781442224872.
- Conley, Heather A. (2013). The new foreign policy frontier : U.S. interests and actors in the Arctic. Washington, DC: Center for Strategic and International Studies. ISBN 9781442224612.
- Conley, Heather A.; Rohloff, Caroline (2015). The new ice curtain : Russia's strategic reach to the Arctic (eBook ed.). Washington, DC: Center for Strategic & International Studies. ISBN 9781442258839.
- Conley, Heather A.; Mina, James; Stefanov, Ruslan; Vladimirov, Martin (2016). The Kremlin Playbook: understanding Russian influence in Central and Eastern Europe. Lanham: CSIS/Rowman & Littlefield. ISBN 978-1-4422-7958-2.
- Hicks, Kathleen H.; Conley, Heather A.; O'Grady, John A. (2016). Evaluating future U.S. Army force posture in Europe : Phase I report. Washington, DC: Center for Strategic & International Studies. ISBN 9781442259249.
- Conley, Heather A.; Mina, James; Nguyen, Phuong (2016). A rebalanced transatlantic policy toward the Asia-Pacific region. Lanham, MD: Rowman & Littlefield. ISBN 9781442259478.
- Conley, Heather A.; Hemmings, Alan D.; Offerdal, Kristine; Oral, Nilufer (2016). Conley, Heather A. (ed.). History lessons for the Arctic : what international maritime disputes tell us about a new ocean. Washington, DC: Center for Strategic & International Studies. ISBN 9781442279827.
- Conley, Heather A.; Melino, Matthew; Østhagen, Andreas (2017). Maritime Futures : the Arctic and the Bering Strait Region. Blue Ridge Summit: Center for Strategic & International Studies. ISBN 9781442280335.
- Conley, Heather A.; Rathke, Jeffrey; Melino, Matthew (February 2018). Enhanced deterrence in the North : a 21st century European engagement strategy (eBook ed.). Washington, DC: Center for Strategic & International Studies. ISBN 9781442280502.
- Alterman, Jon B.; Conley, Heather A.; Malka, Haim; Ruy, Donatienne (2018). Restoring the Eastern Mediterranean as a U.S. strategic anchor. Washington, DC: Center for Strategic & International Studies. ISBN 9781442280731.
- Conley, Heather A.; Ruy, Donatienne (2018). Crossing Borders : How the Migration Crisis Transformed Europe's External Policy. Washington, DC: Center for Strategic and International Studies; Lanham. ISBN 9781442280823.
- Conley, Heather A.; Ruy, Donatienne (2018). Crossing Borders : How the Migration Crisis Transformed Europe's External Policy (eBook ed.). Washington, DC: Center for Strategic & International Studies. ISBN 9781442280830.
- Conley, Heather A. (2019). The Kremlin playbook 2 : the enablers (eBook ed.). Washington, DC: Center for Strategic & International Studies. ISBN 9781442281127.
- Conley, Heather A.; Melino, Matthew (2020). America's Arctic moment : great power competition in the Arctic to 2050. Washington, DC: Center for Strategic & International Studies. ISBN 9781538140130.
