= 2006 Southwark London Borough Council election =

2006 Southwark Council election
- 4 May 2006

All council seats
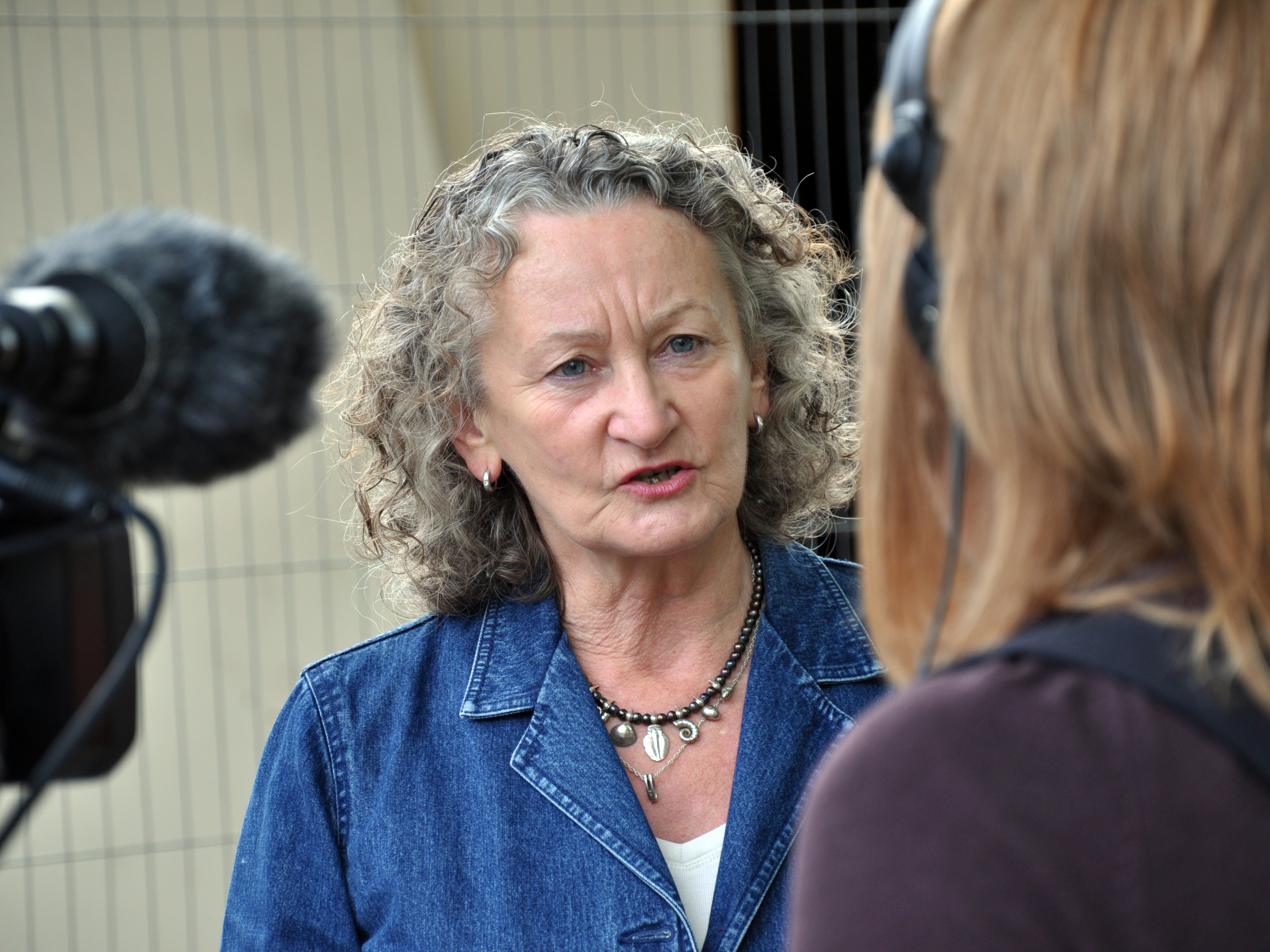
	First party	Second party	Third party
Leader	Peter John	Nick Stanton	Lewis Robinson
Party	Labour	Liberal Democrats	Conservative
Leader since	2004	2000
Leader's seat	South Camberwell	Riverside	College
Last election	28 seats, %	30 seats, %	5 seats, %
Seats won	28	28	6
Seat change	Steady	▼2	▲1
Popular vote	24,136	20,333	9,760
Percentage	38.45%	32.39%	15.55%
Swing	▲1.07	▼5.66	▲2.6
	Fourth party
Leader	Jenny Jones
Party	Green
Leader since	May 2006
Leader's seat	South Camberwell
Last election	0 seat, %
Seats won	1
Seat change	▲1
Popular vote	6,259
Percentage	9.97
Swing	▲2.77
- Map of the results of the 2006 Southwark council election. Conservatives in blue, Greens in green, Labour in red and Liberal Democrats in yellow.
Leader of Largest Party before election
Nick Stanton
Liberal Democrats
Subsequent Leader of Largest Party
Nick Stanton
Liberal Democrats

Elections to Southwark Council were held on 4 May 2006. The whole council was up for election for the first time since the 2002 election.

Southwark local elections are held every four years, with the next due in 2010. The council remained in no overall control.

== Election result ==

Southwark local election result 2006
Party	Seats	Gains	Losses	Net gain/loss	Seats %	Votes %	Votes	+/−
Labour	28	5	5	Steady	44.4	38.45	24,136	▲1.07
Liberal Democrats	28	3	5	▼2	44.4	32.39	20,333	▼5.66
Conservative	6	1	0	▲1	9.5	15.55	9,760	▲2.6
Green	1	1	0	▲1	1.6	9.97	6,259	▲2.77
Independent	0	0	0	Steady	0.0	2.37	1,488	▼0.36
Respect	0	0	0	Steady	0.0	0.57	359	New
Socialist	0	0	0	Steady	0.0	0.37	231	▼0.51
CPA	0	0	0	Steady	0.0	0.33	210	▲0.02

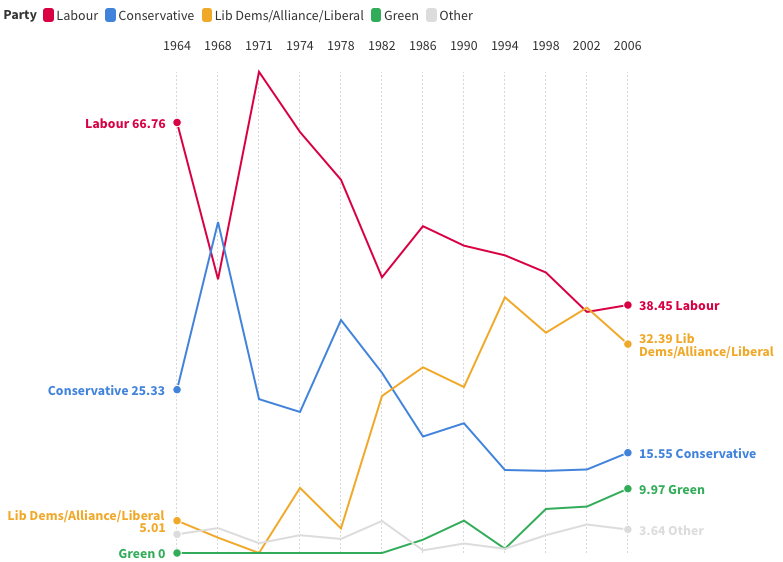
Southwark Council voting history

== Ward results ==
* - Existing Councillor seeking re-election.

=== Brunswick Park ===
Brunswick Park
Party	Candidate	Votes	%	±%
Labour	Ian Wingfield*	1,701	48.6	−2.4
Labour	Alison McGovern	1,644	47.0	−9.6
Labour	Sandra Rhule	1,591	45.5	−9.5
Liberal Democrats	Poddy Clark	1,304	37.3	+16.4
Liberal Democrats	Gemma O'Keeffe	1,257	35.9	+17.1
Liberal Democrats	Anood Al-Samerai	1,169	33.4	+15.9
Green	Adrienne Grimsditch	344	9.8	−3.0
Green	Joao Carvalho	289	8.3	−2.7
Green	Ben Jenkins	276	7.9	−3.0
Conservative	Tania Brisby	224	6.4	−5.3
Conservative	Julian Popov	190	5.4	−5.6
Conservative	Andrew Mitchell	188	5.4	−4.7
Turnout		3,508	41.0	+18.0
Labour hold		Swing		
Labour hold		Swing		
Labour hold		Swing		

=== Camberwell Green ===
Camberwell Green
Party	Candidate	Votes	%	±%
Labour	Dora Dixon-Fyle*	2,018	64.2	+14.3
Labour	John Friary*	1,981	63.1	+16.6
Labour	Christopher Page	1,889	60.1	+16.3
Liberal Democrats	Peta Cubberley	545	17.4	−24.5
Liberal Democrats	Paul Miles	483	15.4	−26.0
Liberal Democrats	Jon Phillips	450	14.3	−26.7
Green	Joseph Healy	380	12.1	+6.0
Green	Michael Pardoe	285	9.1	+4.7
Green	Robbie Kelly	284	9.0	+5.3
Conservative	Robert Hayward	251	8.0	+4.2
Conservative	Gerald Chan	242	7.7	+3.9
Conservative	George Smith	231	7.4	+4.7
Turnout		3,159	32.7	+3.4
Labour hold		Swing		
Labour hold		Swing		
Labour hold		Swing		

=== Cathedrals ===
Cathedrals
Party	Candidate	Votes	%	±%
Liberal Democrats	Adele Morris	1,359	49.0	−13.3
Liberal Democrats	Daniel McCarthy*	1,332	48.1	−14.0
Liberal Democrats	David Noakes	1,193	43.0	−18.9
Labour	Anne Worsley	555	20.0	−1.1
Labour	King Abbas Mensah	551	19.9	−0.8
Labour	Tania Boler	545	19.7	+0.7
Green	Michael Osborne	370	13.3	+7.0
Conservative	Jonathan Newton	367	13.2	+5.2
Conservative	Daniel Cohen	366	13.2	+5.6
Green	Jayne Forbes	338	12.2	+5.3
Conservative	Fabian Richter	328	11.8	+5.0
Green	Neil Walsh	320	11.5	+5.4
Socialist	Lois Austin	231	8.3	N/A
Turnout		2,787	27.8	+5.6
Liberal Democrats hold		Swing		
Liberal Democrats hold		Swing		
Liberal Democrats hold		Swing		

=== Chaucer ===
Chaucer
Party	Candidate	Votes	%	±%
Liberal Democrats	Timothy McNally	1,225	41.6	−15.3
Liberal Democrats	Lorraine Zuleta*	1,030	35.0	−18.6
Liberal Democrats	Mackie Sheik	1,013	34.4	−21.0
Labour	Musadiq Dawudu	1,005	34.1	−0.6
Labour	Stephen Lancashire	999	33.9	+1.5
Labour	Claire Walker	925	31.4	+1.2
Green	Amanda Penfold	429	14.6	+9.2
Conservative	Lee Banner	351	11.9	+8.3
Green	Kimberley Ferron	308	10.5	+7.3
Independent	Abdur-Rahman Olayiwola	289	9.8	−45.6
Conservative	Andrew Young	288	9.8	+6.7
Conservative	Vikrant Bhansali	269	9.1	+6.3
Green	Richard Scrase	231	7.8	+4.8
Turnout		2,958	28.9	−2.8
Liberal Democrats hold		Swing		
Liberal Democrats hold		Swing		
Liberal Democrats hold		Swing		

=== College ===
College
Party	Candidate	Votes	%	±%
Conservative	Mark Humphreys*	1,728	54.0	+1.8
Conservative	Michelle Holford	1,566	49.0	+1.5
Conservative	Lewis Robinson*	1,530	47.8	+0.1
Labour	Carol Britton	973	30.4	−2.3
Labour	Andrew Simmons**	880	27.5	−0.9
Labour	Simon Taylor	818	25.6	−2.6
Liberal Democrats	Alison Farrow	641	20.0	+6.8
Liberal Democrats	Patricia Mynott	543	17.0	+4.8
Liberal Democrats	Guy Sisson	454	14.2	+3.1
Turnout		3,221	39.1	+6.3
Conservative hold		Swing		
Conservative hold		Swing		
Conservative hold		Swing		

Andrew Simmons was a sitting councillor for The Lane ward

=== East Dulwich ===
East Dulwich
Party	Candidate	Votes	%	±%
Liberal Democrats	Richard Thomas	2,036	48.6	+30.3
Liberal Democrats	Jonathan Mitchell	1,998	47.7	+30.1
Liberal Democrats	James Barber	1,969	47.0	+30.3
Labour	Helen Morrissey	1,364	32.6	−10.7
Labour	Leslie Alden	1,336	31.9	−9.5
Labour	Charlie Smith*	1,327	31.7	−10.8
Independent	Ashwinkumar Tanna	635	15.2	N/A
Conservative	Jessica Mary	446	10.7	−6.6
Conservative	Stephen Smith	399	9.5	−7.3
Conservative	Lindsay Chathli	387	9.2	−7.0
Turnout		4,213	48.5	+24.5
Liberal Democrats gain from Labour		Swing		
Liberal Democrats gain from Labour		Swing		
Liberal Democrats gain from Labour		Swing		

=== East Walworth ===
East Walworth
Party	Candidate	Votes	%	±%
Labour	Kirsty McNeill	1,488	47.1	+15.3
Liberal Democrats	Nicola Salmon*	1,452	46.0	−7.3
Labour	Martin Seaton	1,432	45.3	+15.1
Liberal Democrats	Catherine Bowman*	1,410	44.6	−8.2
Labour	Rhodri Thomas	1,403	44.4	+15.1
Liberal Democrats	Neil Watson*	1,296	41.0	−6.3
Conservative	Michael Champion	305	9.7	+4.6
Conservative	David Hewson	261	8.3	+3.8
Conservative	Robert Hone	236	7.5	+3.2
Independent	Lucy Carrington	208	6.6	N/A
Turnout		3,198	35.4	+8.9
Labour gain from Liberal Democrats		Swing		
Liberal Democrats hold		Swing		
Labour gain from Liberal Democrats		Swing		

=== Faraday ===
Faraday
Party	Candidate	Votes	%	±%
Labour	Paul Bates*	1,809	54.8	+13.2
Labour	Lorraine Lauder*	1,728	52.3	+10.0
Labour	Abdul Mohamed*	1,641	49.7	+4.6
Liberal Democrats	Maria Linforth-Hall	870	26.3	−12.8
Liberal Democrats	David Gustave	870	26.3	−12.3
Liberal Democrats	Andrew Mayer	839	25.4	−12.0
Respect	Margot Lindsay	359	10.9	+−0
Independent	Josefina Esteve	219	6.6	N/A
Conservative	Noel Cosgrave	210	6.4	+3.1
Independent	Lionel Wright	207	6.3	N/A
Conservative	Rebecca Humphreys	176	5.3	+2.8
Conservative	Joseph McKenna	168	5.1	+2.3
Green	Peter Donnell	149	4.5	+1.2
Green	Ryszarda Burmicz	145	4.4	+1.2
Green	James Kirkpatrick	134	4.1	+1.5
Turnout		3,318	37.6	+2.7
Labour hold		Swing		
Labour hold		Swing		
Labour hold		Swing		

=== Grange ===
Grange
Party	Candidate	Votes	%	±%
Liberal Democrats	Denise Capstick*	1,332	54.4	−6.5
Liberal Democrats	Linda Manchester*	1,309	53.5	−4.6
Liberal Democrats	Robert Skelly*	1,180	48.2	−6.3
Labour	Amos Adeyemi-Adejinmi	706	28.8	−2.5
Labour	George Bevis	608	24.8	−4.4
Labour	Rosemary Whitlock	602	24.6	−0.1
Conservative	Adam Cakebread	392	16.0	+9.0
Conservative	Martin Smith	361	14.7	+8.3
Conservative	Jude Darfoor	328	13.4	+7.0
Turnout		2,462	26.6	+3.7
Liberal Democrats hold		Swing		
Liberal Democrats hold		Swing		
Liberal Democrats hold		Swing		

=== Livesey ===
Livesey
Party	Candidate	Votes	%	±%
Labour	Mary Foulkes	1,831	49.5	+5.7
Labour	Richard Livingstone	1,797	48.6	+6.4
Labour	Andrew Pakes	1,698	45.9	+4.6
Liberal Democrats	Raouf Ben Salem	1,513	40.9	−6.4
Liberal Democrats	Alex Berhanu	1,338	36.2	−9.9
Liberal Democrats	Graham Neale*	1,321	35.7	−10.7
Green	Kevin Gillespie	201	5.4	+0.5
Green	Tamra Poorun	171	4.6	N/A
Conservative	Derek Fordham	161	4.4	+1.2
Green	Tomas Wilcox	160	4.3	N/A
Conservative	Margaret Fordham	155	4.2	+1.3
Conservative	Edward Robinson	147	4.0	+1.6
CPA	Oladele Ogunnaike	84	2.3	+0.4
Turnout		3,714	39.1	+5.8
Labour gain from Liberal Democrats		Swing		
Labour gain from Liberal Democrats		Swing		
Labour gain from Liberal Democrats		Swing		

=== Newington ===
Newington
Party	Candidate	Votes	%	±%
Liberal Democrats	James Gurling*	1,471	52.4	−3.2
Liberal Democrats	Caroline Pidgeon*	1,453	51.8	−4.6
Liberal Democrats	Jelil Ladipo*	1,429	50.9	−2.3
Labour	Denise Rose	945	33.7	+2.1
Labour	Sebastian Dance	897	32.0	+0.5
Labour	Michelle Stanistreet	766	27.3	+0.9
Conservative	James Legge	320	11.4	+5.6
Conservative	David Loader	308	11.0	+5.9
Conservative	Alan Williams	261	9.3	+4.2
Turnout		2,843	31.2	+3.6
Liberal Democrats hold		Swing		
Liberal Democrats hold		Swing		
Liberal Democrats hold		Swing		

=== Nunhead ===
Nunhead
Party	Candidate	Votes	%	±%
Labour	Fiona Colley*	1,272	52.2	+2.4
Labour	Dominic Thorncroft*	1,244	51.0	+2.7
Labour	Althea Smith	1,228	50.3	+5.1
Liberal Democrats	Laura Davies	446	18.3	+2.7
Green	Steve Barbe	407	16.7	+6.5
Liberal Democrats	Vivienne Todd	400	16.4	+2.2
Liberal Democrats	Alexander Ehmann	337	13.8	+3.5
Green	John Spencer	334	13.7	+2.6
Green	Lalu Hanuman	333	13.7	+2.9
Conservative	Graeme Brown	323	13.2	+3.2
Conservative	Aditya Chathli	295	12.1	+3.8
Conservative	Gogo-Rose Ilo	262	10.7	+2.4
Turnout		2,442	28.1	+6.6
Labour hold		Swing		
Labour hold		Swing		
Labour hold		Swing		

=== Peckham ===
Peckham
Party	Candidate	Votes	%	±%
Labour	Barrie Hargrove*	1,703	59.0	+1.5
Labour	Tayo Situ*	1,665	57.7	+3.0
Labour	Olajumoke Oyewunmi	1,652	57.2	+1.8
Liberal Democrats	Rachel ben Salem	374	13.0	+3.2
Liberal Democrats	Julie Glover	279	9.7	+0.3
Liberal Democrats	Patricia MacNaughton	267	9.2	−0.2
Green	Sharon Hogan	249	8.6	+4.6
Green	Lucy Woodford	231	8.0	+4.5
Green	Gwendolyn Einsiedel	210	7.3	+4.4
Conservative	Jane MacLaren	191	6.6	−1.0
Conservative	Stephen Phillips	191	6.6	+0.8
Conservative	Martina Ward	186	6.4	+0.8
CPA	Oluremi Awoshile	150	5.2	+0.3
CPA	Simisola Lawanson	102	3.5	N/A
Turnout		2,900	30.6	+7.7
Labour hold		Swing		
Labour hold		Swing		
Labour hold		Swing		

=== Peckham Rye ===
Peckham Rye
Party	Candidate	Votes	%	±%
Labour	Aubyn Graham**	1,442	42.9	−5.8
Labour	Evrim Laws	1,345	40.0	−3.0
Labour	Robert Smeath*	1,256	37.3	−1.3
Liberal Democrats	Annie Bingham	1,206	35.9	+12.4
Liberal Democrats	Teresa Connolly	1,082	32.2	+11.6
Liberal Democrats	Neil Parker	1,045	31.1	+11.3
Green	Charlie Sekers	739	22.0	+6.9
Conservative	Rebecca Foreman	448	13.3	−4.0
Conservative	Irene Manning	426	12.7	−4.6
Conservative	Oliver Wooller	403	12.0	−5.1
Turnout		3,375	37.3	+14.4
Labour hold		Swing		
Labour hold		Swing		
Labour hold		Swing		

Aubyn Graham was a sitting councillor for The Lane ward

=== Riverside ===
Riverside
Party	Candidate	Votes	%	±%
Liberal Democrats	Nicholas Stanton*	1,080	45.3	−16.7
Liberal Democrats	Eliza Mann*	1,027	43.0	−18.1
Liberal Democrats	Paul Baichoo	988	41.4	−22.0
Labour	Cormac Hollingsworth	652	27.3	+6.4
Labour	Amadu Kabia	540	22.6	+3.1
Labour	Fatmata Koroma	533	22.3	+2.9
Conservative	Hugo De Burgh	488	20.5	+10.8
Conservative	Percy Gray	480	20.1	+10.8
Conservative	Fernando Graca	437	18.3	+9.0
Green	Dan Bates	399	16.7	+8.2
Turnout		2,401	26.9	+4.5
Liberal Democrats hold		Swing		
Liberal Democrats hold		Swing		
Liberal Democrats hold		Swing		

=== Rotherhithe ===
Rotherhithe
Party	Candidate	Votes	%	±%
Liberal Democrats	Anne Yates*	1,134	48.0	−12.0
Liberal Democrats	Jeffrey Hook*	1,102	46.7	−13.4
Liberal Democrats	Columba Blango*	1,036	43.9	−12.6
Labour	Edward Colley	601	25.5	+2.7
Labour	Victoria Fewkes	596	25.2	+2.6
Labour	Frank Pemberton	514	21.8	+1.4
Conservative	Melissa Bean	403	17.1	+8.4
Conservative	Frances Gray	367	15.5	+7.8
Conservative	Matthew Kirk	359	15.2	+7.7
Green	Brendan Connolly	242	10.2	+2.0
Green	Ruvini De Alwis	233	9.9	+4.1
Green	Stephanie Ferron	222	9.4	+4.0
Turnout		2,394	28.2	+5.0
Liberal Democrats hold		Swing		
Liberal Democrats hold		Swing		
Liberal Democrats hold		Swing		

=== South Bermondsey ===
South Bermondsey
Party	Candidate	Votes	%	±%
Liberal Democrats	Helen Jardine-Brown	1,098	48.2	−19.0
Liberal Democrats	Paul Kyriacou*	1,045	45.9	−14.0
Liberal Democrats	Adedokun Lasaki	1,013	44.4	−15.2
Labour	Joseph Fortune	608	26.7	+6.7
Labour	Kate Samuels	586	25.7	+7.0
Labour	Preeti Farooki	577	25.3	+8.0
Conservative	Laura Collins	295	12.9	+6.8
Green	Lorraine Ferron	256	11.2	+6.4
Conservative	David Pilkington	254	11.1	+5.1
Conservative	James Fulton	240	10.5	+5.3
Green	Caspar Krabo	227	10.0	+6.2
Turnout		2,296	27.2	+4.3
Liberal Democrats hold		Swing		
Liberal Democrats hold		Swing		
Liberal Democrats hold		Swing		

=== South Camberwell ===
South Camberwell
Party	Candidate	Votes	%	±%
Labour	Veronica Ward*	1,148	39.8	−8.3
Labour	Peter John*	1,090	37.8	−7.3
Green	Jenny Jones	1,014	35.1	+12.7
Labour	Anad Shukla	967	33.5	−11.4
Green	Liz Wright	914	31.7	+17.2
Green	Storm Poorun	832	28.8	+11.8
Conservative	Christopher Owen	448	15.5	+0.5
Conservative	Helen Owen	425	14.7	+0.7
Conservative	William Rowe**	372	12.9	−1.0
Liberal Democrats	Matthew Shakespeare	339	11.7	−5.2
Liberal Democrats	Hussain Malik	315	10.9	−5.7
Liberal Democrats	Alache Ode	247	8.6	−5.3
Independent	Earnest Diji	143	5.0	N/A
Turnout		2,900	33.8	+9.9
Labour hold		Swing		
Labour hold		Swing		
Green gain from Labour		Swing		

William Rowe was a sitting councillor for College ward

=== Surrey Docks ===
Surrey Docks
Party	Candidate	Votes	%	±%
Liberal Democrats	David Hubber*	1,100	44.5	−14.9
Liberal Democrats	Paul Noblet	1,037	41.9	−16.2
Liberal Democrats	Lisa Rajan*	1,009	40.8	−14.7
Conservative	David Frampton	735	29.7	+9.6
Conservative	Martin Cakebread	702	28.4	+8.9
Conservative	Simon Kingston	665	26.9	+9.0
Labour	Kathleen Whittam	441	17.8	+2.4
Labour	John Hellings	384	15.5	+3.4
Labour	Kamal Prashar	340	13.7	+2.9
Green	Rachelle Ferron	334	13.5	+6.4
Turnout		2,485	27.5	+7.0
Liberal Democrats hold		Swing		
Liberal Democrats hold		Swing		
Liberal Democrats hold		Swing		

=== The Lane ===
The Lane
Party	Candidate	Votes	%	±%
Labour	Mark Glover*	1,466	50.4	−3.4
Labour	Susan Jones	1,343	46.2	−8.6
Labour	Gordon Nardell	1,204	41.4	−12.7
Green	Clare Cochran	679	23.4	+13.3
Green	Jonathan Gaventa	523	18.0	+8.1
Liberal Democrats	Joanna Shaw	497	17.1	−6.1
Green	Orlando Einsiedel	484	16.7	+7.3
Liberal Democrats	Eduardo Reyes	458	15.8	−3.5
Liberal Democrats	Alasdair Murray	455	15.7	−0.4
Conservative	James Fraser	393	13.5	+3.4
Conservative	Katherine Vineall	375	12.9	+3.3
Conservative	Alan Macleod	371	12.8	+3.5
Turnout		2,920	31.1	+7.4
Labour hold		Swing		
Labour hold		Swing		
Labour hold		Swing		

=== Village ===
Village
Party	Candidate	Votes	%	±%
Conservative	Tobias Eckersley*	1,996	45.0	+3.3
Conservative	Robin Crookshank Hilton	1,880	42.4	+2.8
Conservative	Nicholas Vineall	1,731	39.0	+1.4
Labour	Michelle Pearce*	1,667	37.6	−13.5
Labour	Kate Cinnamon	1,493	33.6	−4.7
Labour	Barbara Portwin	1,406	31.7	−5.2
Green	Ruth Jenkins	715	16.1	+7.2
Liberal Democrats	Jean Halden	587	13.2	+1.0
Green	Lee Woodford	561	12.6	+6.4
Liberal Democrats	Mark Valladeres	484	10.9	−2.5
Liberal Democrats	Ronald Halden	423	9.5	−2.4
Turnout		4,447	51.6	+10.0
Conservative gain from Labour		Swing		
Conservative hold		Swing		
Conservative hold		Swing		

== By-Elections 2006-10 ==
Riverside by-election, 13 December 2007
Party	Candidate	Votes	%	±%
Liberal Democrats	Anood Al-Samerai	1,114	49.8	+8.4
Labour	Cormac Hollingsworth	691	30.9	+3.6
Conservative	Rahoul Bhansali	260	11.6	−8.9
Green	Amanda Penfold	122	5.5	−11.2
UKIP	Fernando Grace	49	2.2	N/A
Majority		423	18.9	+4.8
Turnout		2,236	24.7	−2.2
Liberal Democrats hold		Swing		

The by-election was called following the resignation of Cllr. Paul D. L. Baichoo.

Rotherhithe by-election, 9 October 2008
Party	Candidate	Votes	%	±%
Liberal Democrats	Wilma Nelson	1,149	56.8	+8.8
Labour	Kath Whittam	618	30.6	+5.1
Conservative	Loanna Morrison	255	12.6	−4.5
Majority		531	26.2	+7.8
Turnout		2,022	23.8	−4.4
Liberal Democrats hold		Swing		

The by-election was called following the death of Cllr. Anne Yates.
