= David Gustave =

David Gustave, known as Dawood Gustave (February 23, 1967), is a British businessman, lawyer, former youth advocate and one-time political figure.

== Early life and education ==
Gustave is of mixed Irish and St. Lucian heritage. He was raised in Peckham, London and Bermondsey where he suffered racial abuse from neighbours and learned about violence and aggression as a survival tool,. At 16, he left school. That same year, unable to cope with his environment, he also left home.

At age 30, Gustave enrolled in an adult education course where he took ‘A’ level and undergraduate equivalency courses. Among the external readers of a research paper he wrote was an Oxford University professor who encouraged him to apply to Oxford. At age 32, Gustave enrolled as an undergraduate to study history at Wadham College.

== Career ==
After Oxford, Gustave won a number of scholarships from the Middle Temple to pursue a career at the Bar. He started working with young gang members at Kids Company as an Educational Motivator.

Gustave has been described as a ‘Social Visionary’. He was featured in Channel 4's ‘Disarming Britain’ debate alongside Dawn Butler, Dominic Grieve and Peter Hitchens and in the ‘CNN Heroes’ Series alongside Russell Symonds.

Gustave states ‘he is not content with fulfilling his own ambitions, but is determined to help others to set and reach theirs’. Gustave has been described in the media as the ‘British Obama’ Gustave is a member of the Labour Party.

Gustave founded Reluctantly Brave in 2012 to guide leaders and businesses to be successful through being their authentic selves. As CEO of Reluctantly Brave, he advises companies from start-ups to multinationals on leadership, strategy and creativity.

== Awards and honours ==
- 2018: Financial Times / EMPower Top 100 Ethnic Minority Leaders, placed 30th
- 2017: Financial Times / EMPower Top 100 Ethnic Minority Leaders, placed 62nd
- 2009: One of the 100 people who make Britain a happier place.
- 2008: Evening Standard's list of the 1000 most influential people in London
