= 2010 Southwark London Borough Council election =

2010 Southwark Council election
- 6 May 2010

All 63 seats on Southwark London Borough Council 32 seats needed for a majority
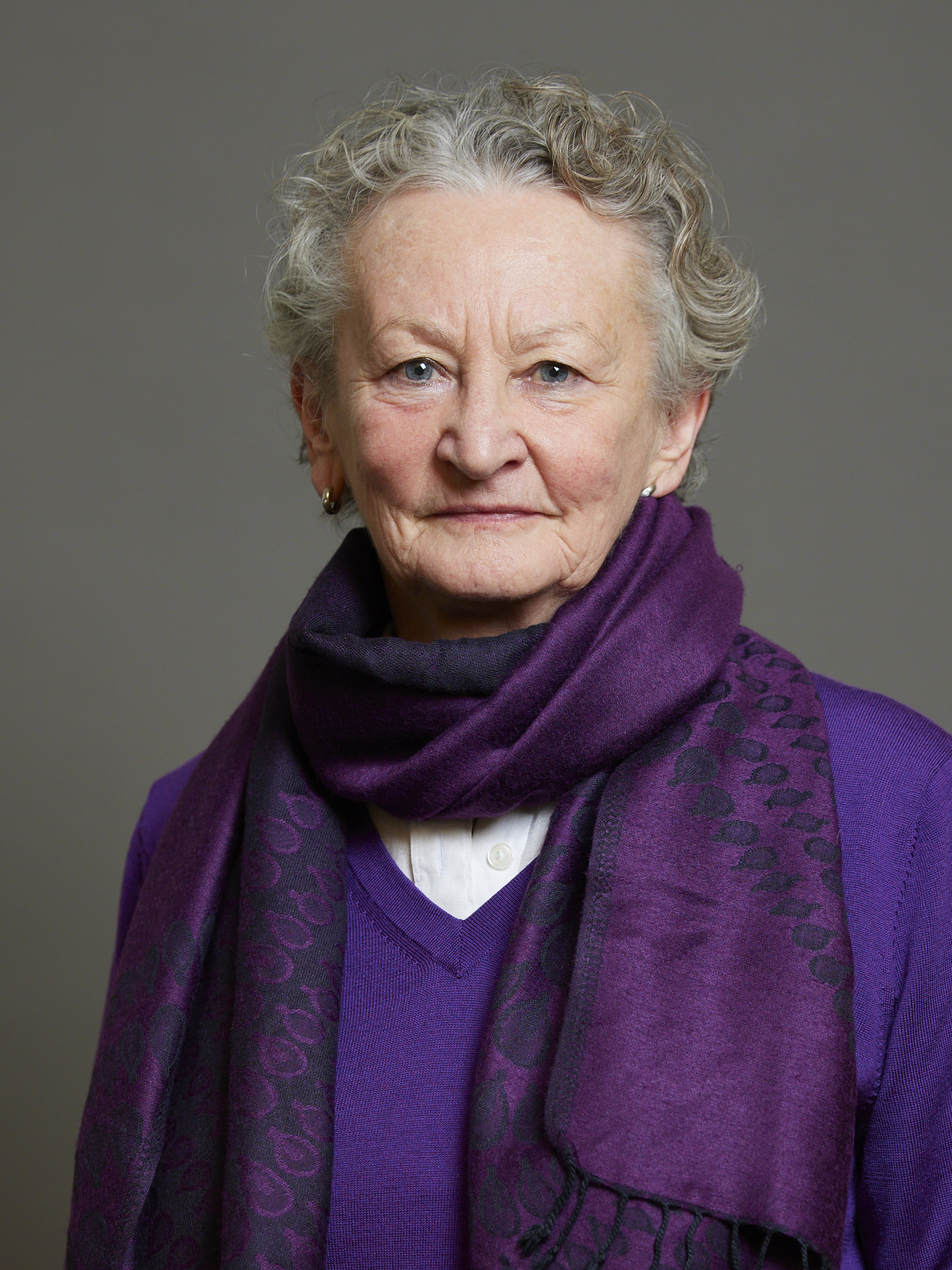
	First party	Second party	Third party
Leader	Peter John	Nick Stanton	Lewis Robinson
Party	Labour	Liberal Democrats	Conservative
Leader since	2004	2000
Leader's seat	South Camberwell	Riverside	College
Last election	28 seats, 38.45%	28 seats, 32.39%	6 seats, 15.55%
Seats won	35	25	3
Seat change	▲7	▼3	▼3
Popular vote	44,933	34,438	18,464
Percentage	40.4%	30.96%	16.6%
Swing	▲1.95%	▼1.43%	▲1.05%
	Fourth party
Leader	Jenny Jones
Party	Green
Leader since	May 2006
Leader's seat	South Camberwell (defeated)
Last election	1 seat, 9.97%
Seats won	0
Seat change	▼1
Popular vote	11,115
Percentage	9.99%
Swing	▲0.02%
Leader of Largest Party before election
Nick Stanton
Liberal Democrats
Subsequent Leader of Largest Party
Peter John
Labour

Map of the results of the 2010 Southwark council election. Conservatives in blue, Labour in red and Liberal Democrats in yellow.

Elections for Southwark Council were held on 6 May 2010. The 2010 General Election and other local elections took place on the same day.

In London council elections the entire council is elected every four years, opposed to some local elections where one councillor is elected every year for three of the four years. Southwark has 21 wards, each electing 3 councillors giving a total number of seats as 63.

The Labour Party gained overall control, which they had previously had until 2002, replacing the previous Lib Dem-Conservative coalition. The Labour Party increased their vote substantially, which it was suggested was caused by the high turnout. Turnout was approximately double that of the 2006 elections, due to the general election being held on the same day.

Green London Assembly member Jenny Jones lost her seat.

== Results ==

Southwark Council election result 2010
Party	Seats	Gains	Losses	Net gain/loss	Seats %	Votes %	Votes	+/−
Labour	35	7	0	▲7	55.6	40.4	44,933	▲1.95
Liberal Democrats	25	1	4	▼3	39.7	30.96	34,438	▼1.43
Conservative	3	0	3	▼3	4.8	16.6	18,464	▲1.05
Green	0	0	1	▼1	0.0	9.99	11,115	▲0.02
Independent	0	0	0	Steady	0.0	1.21	1,342	▼1.16
BNP	0	0	0	Steady	0.0	0.4	442	New
Camberwell Party	0	0	0	Steady	0.0	0.3	329	New
English Democrat	0	0	0	Steady	0.0	0.14	157	New

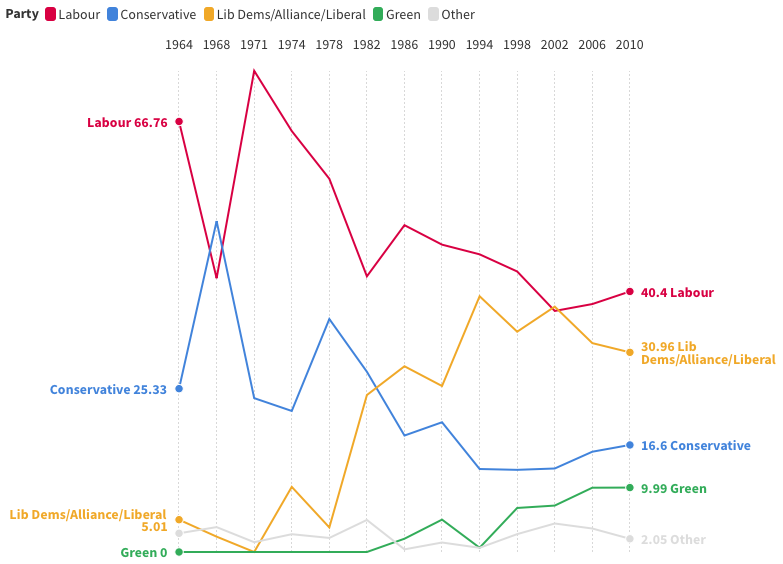
Southwark Council voting history

== Ward results ==
* - Existing Councillor seeking re-election.

=== Brunswick Park ===
Brunswick Park
Party	Candidate	Votes	%	±%
Labour	John Friary**	2,812	54.5	+7.5
Labour	Norma Gibbs	2,572	49.8	+4.3
Labour	Ian Wingfield*	2,444	47.4	−1.2
Liberal Democrats	David Long	1,233	23.9	−13.4
Liberal Democrats	Paul Miles	1,061	20.6	−15.3
Liberal Democrats	Bayonle Olabiyi	872	16.9	−16.5
Green	Susan Giles	787	15.3	+5.5
Green	Jenny Williams	740	14.3	+6.0
Conservative	Tania Brisby	592	11.5	+5.1
Green	Andrew Spring	554	10.7	+2.8
Conservative	Robert Hayward	530	10.3	+4.9
Conservative	Julian Popov	496	9.6	+4.2
Turnout		5,161	58.3	+17.3
Labour hold		Swing		
Labour hold		Swing		
Labour hold		Swing		

John Friary was a sitting councillor for Camberwell Green ward

=== Camberwell Green ===
Camberwell Green
Party	Candidate	Votes	%	±%
Labour	Kevin Ahern	3,261	59.3	−3.8
Labour	Dora Dixon-Fyle*	3,224	58.6	−5.6
Labour	Emmanuel Oyewole	2,956	53.7	−6.4
Liberal Democrats	Yvonne Bruce	1,155	21.0	+3.6
Liberal Democrats	Philipp Leeta	713	13.0	−2.4
Liberal Democrats	Zita Mohamad	695	12.6	−1.7
Conservative	Ben Spencer	549	10.0	+2.0
Conservative	Marjorie Thompson	519	9.4	+1.7
Conservative	Graham Davison	510	9.3	+1.9
Green	Dawn Henderson	448	8.1	−4.0
Green	David Evans	412	7.5	−1.6
Camberwell Party	Jordana Chapman	391	7.1	N/A
Camberwell Party	James Johnston	323	5.9	N/A
Green	Paul Ingram	306	5.6	−3.4
Camberwell Party	Thomas Leighton	273	5.0	N/A
Turnout		5,503	53.7	+21.0
Labour hold		Swing		
Labour hold		Swing		
Labour hold		Swing		

=== Cathedrals ===
Cathedrals
Party	Candidate	Votes	%	±%
Liberal Democrats	Adele Morris*	2,959	50.1	+1.1
Liberal Democrats	David Noakes*	2,574	43.6	+0.6
Liberal Democrats	Geoffrey Thornton	2,136	36.2	−11.9
Labour	Rowenna Davis	1,641	31.2	+11.2
Labour	Charlie Smith	1,529	25.9	+6.0
Labour	Mark Williams	1,335	22.6	+2.9
Conservative	Michael Davenport	992	16.8	+3.6
Conservative	Julie Shankly	931	15.8	+2.6
Conservative	Zac Phillips	864	14.6	+2.8
Green	Timothy Martin	740	12.5	−0.8
Green	Ian Pocock	683	11.6	−0.6
Independent	Ken Hayes	268	4.5	N/A
Turnout		5,903	52.3	+24.5
Liberal Democrats hold		Swing		
Liberal Democrats hold		Swing		
Liberal Democrats hold		Swing		

=== Chaucer ===
Chaucer
Party	Candidate	Votes	%	±%
Liberal Democrats	Poddy Clark	2,509	41.9	+6.9
Liberal Democrats	Tim McNally*	2,455	41.0	−0.6
Labour	Clare Hickson	2,101	35.1	+3.7
Liberal Democrats	Mackie Sheik *	2,095	35.0	+0.6
Labour	Musadiq Dawudu	2,037	34.0	−0.1
Labour	Steve Lancashire	2,020	33.8	−0.1
Conservative	Simon Kingston	926	15.5	+3.6
Conservative	Suzie Didier-Garnham	911	15.2	+5.4
Conservative	Matthew Salt	841	14.1	+5.0
Green	Marieluise Horne	512	8.6	−6.0
Green	Max Hogg	399	6.7	−3.8
Green	Catherine Miller	377	6.2	−1.6
Turnout		5,985	54.7	+25.8
Liberal Democrats hold		Swing		
Liberal Democrats hold		Swing		
Labour gain from Liberal Democrats		Swing		

=== College ===
College
Party	Candidate	Votes	%	±%
Labour	Helen Hayes	2,181	37.1	+6.7
Labour	Andy Simmons	1,992	33.9	+6.4
Conservative	Lewis Robinson*	1,903	32.4	−15.4
Labour	Gordon Nardell**	1,871	31.8	+6.2
Conservative	Lindsay Chathli	1,834	31.2	−22.8
Conservative	Stephen Smith	1,789	30.4	−18.6
Liberal Democrats	Theresa Connolly	1,486	25.3	+5.3
Liberal Democrats	John Haythornthwaite	1,111	18.9	+1.9
Liberal Democrats	Lorraine Zuleta**	1,060	18.0	+3.8
Green	Isobel Bennett	588	10.0	N/A
Green	Chris Bell	463	7.9	N/A
Green	Gavin Nicolson	338	5.8	N/A
Turnout		5,880	67.8	+28.7
Labour gain from Conservative		Swing		
Labour gain from Conservative		Swing		
Conservative hold		Swing		

Gordon Nardell was a sitting councillor for The Lane ward

Lorraine Zuleta was a sitting councillor for Chaucer ward

=== East Dulwich ===
East Dulwich
Party	Candidate	Votes	%	±%
Liberal Democrats	James Barber*	2,854	45.0	−2.0
Liberal Democrats	Jonathan Mitchell*	2,720	42.9	−4.8
Liberal Democrats	Rosie Shimell	2,435	38.4	−10.2
Labour	Leslie Alden	2,061	32.5	+0.6
Labour	Joani Reid	1,952	30.8	−1.8
Labour	Oliver Kempton	1,907	30.1	−1.6
Conservative	Christopher Fish	920	14.5	+3.8
Conservative	Louise Dalton	871	13.7	+4.2
Conservative	Janet Sam-King	779	12.3	+3.1
Green	Anna Goodman	718	11.3	N/A
Green	Lucy Trinder	572	9.0	N/A
Green	Derek Kinrade	436	6.9	N/A
Turnout		6,343	70.9	+22.4
Liberal Democrats hold		Swing		
Liberal Democrats hold		Swing		
Liberal Democrats hold		Swing		

=== East Walworth ===
East Walworth
Party	Candidate	Votes	%	±%
Labour	Martin Seaton*	1,931	43.9	−1.4
Labour	Helen Morrissey	1,892	43.0	−4.1
Labour	Darren Merrill	1,870	42.5	−1.9
Liberal Democrats	Ben Francis	1,767	40.1	−4.5
Liberal Democrats	Nicola Salmon*	1,740	39.5	−6.5
Liberal Democrats	Peter Wright	1,441	32.7	−8.3
Conservative	Victoria Kent	530	12.0	+2.3
Conservative	Richard Treffler	466	10.6	+2.3
Conservative	Nikesh Pandit	458	10.4	+2.9
Green	Nick Young	373	8.4	N/A
Turnout		4,402	56.5	+21.1
Labour hold		Swing		
Labour gain from Liberal Democrats		Swing		
Labour hold		Swing		

=== Faraday ===
Faraday
Party	Candidate	Votes	%	±%
Labour	Lorraine Lauder*	2,696	61.0	+8.7
Labour	Dan Garfield	2,682	60.7	+5.9
Labour	Abdul Mohamed*	2,450	55.4	+5.7
Liberal Democrats	Patricia MacNaughton	869	19.7	−6.6
Liberal Democrats	Sarah Mustoe	704	15.9	−11.7
Liberal Democrats	Mohamed Sillah	654	14.8	−10.6
Conservative	Noel Cosgrave	547	12.4	+6.0
Conservative	Susanna Clark	542	12.3	+7.0
Conservative	Ian Whitehouse	444	10.0	+4.9
Green	Jo Wright	293	6.6	+2.1
English Democrat	Yohara Robby	157	3.6	N/A
Turnout		4,421	51.7	+14.1
Labour hold		Swing		
Labour hold		Swing		
Labour hold		Swing		

=== Grange ===
Grange
Party	Candidate	Votes	%	±%
Liberal Democrats	Denise Capstick*	2,513	45.6	−8.8
Liberal Democrats	Mark Gettleson	2,328	42.3	−5.9
Liberal Democrats	Linda Manchester*	2,154	39.1	−14.4
Labour	Ron Harley	1,605	29.1	+0.3
Labour	Andrew Hewitt	1,522	27.6	+2.8
Labour	Hannah Jameson	1,495	27.1	+2.5
Conservative	Liam Gregory	1,110	20.2	+4.2
Conservative	Pauline Boyle	1,081	19.6	+4.9
Conservative	Samuel Coates	986	17.9	+4.5
Green	Jonathan Tanner	760	13.8	N/A
Turnout		5,507	52.7	+26.1
Liberal Democrats hold		Swing		
Liberal Democrats hold		Swing		
Liberal Democrats hold		Swing		

=== Livesey ===
Livesey
Party	Candidate	Votes	%	±%
Labour	Richard Livingstone*	3,062	59.5	+10.9
Labour	Catherine McDonald	2,864	55.6	+6.1
Labour	Michael Situ	2,786	54.1	+8.2
Liberal Democrats	Alex Berhanu	1,351	26.2	−10.0
Liberal Democrats	Roger Lynch	1,262	24.5	−16.4
Liberal Democrats	Louise Townsend	1,166	22.6	−13.1
Conservative	Matthew Carey	519	10.1	+6.1
Conservative	Derek Fordham	479	9.3	+4.9
Conservative	Margaret Fordham	462	9.0	+4.8
Green	Sandra Lane	285	5.5	+0.1
Green	Robin Powell	216	4.2	−0.4
Green	Marco Soares	214	4.2	−0.1
Turnout		5,150	55.1	+16.0
Labour hold		Swing		
Labour hold		Swing		
Labour hold		Swing		

=== Newington ===
Newington
Party	Candidate	Votes	%	±%
Labour	Neil Coyle	2,174	40.0	+6.3
Liberal Democrats	Catherine Bowman	2,134	39.1	−13.3
Labour	Patrick Diamond	2,095	38.4	+6.4
Liberal Democrats	Jelil Ladipo*	2,068	37.9	−13.0
Labour	Claudia Reid	2,037	37.3	+10.0
Liberal Democrats	Jeremy Leach	1,985	36.4	−15.4
Conservative	Margaret Collins	639	11.7	+0.3
Conservative	Paul Coffin	546	10.0	−1.0
Conservative	Frances Gray	501	9.2	−0.1
Green	Martin Payne	479	8.8	N/A
Green	Danny Bates	403	7.4	N/A
Green	Neil Walsh	359	6.6	N/A
Independent	Richard Rees	211	3.9	N/A
Turnout		5,454	57.0	+15.8
Labour gain from Liberal Democrats		Swing		
Liberal Democrats hold		Swing		
Labour gain from Liberal Democrats		Swing		

=== Nunhead ===
Nunhead
Party	Candidate	Votes	%	±%
Labour	Fiona Colley*	2,804	55.4	+3.2
Labour	Sunil Chopra	2,698	53.3	+2.3
Labour	Althea Smith*	2,496	49.3	−1.0
Liberal Democrats	Martyn Barmby	1,144	22.6	+4.3
Liberal Democrats	Paul Melly	878	17.3	+0.9
Liberal Democrats	Matthew Shakespeare	797	15.7	+1.9
Conservative	David Barratt	744	14.7	+1.5
Conservative	Harry Chathli	630	12.4	+0.3
Conservative	Colin Pereira	601	11.9	+1.2
Green	Steve Barbe	566	11.2	−5.5
Green	Brendan Daly	510	10.1	−3.6
Green	Ann Darnbrough	481	9.5	−4.2
Turnout		5,061	55.6	+27.5
Labour hold		Swing		
Labour hold		Swing		
Labour hold		Swing		

=== Peckham ===
Peckham
Party	Candidate	Votes	%	±%
Labour	Barrie Hargrove*	3,435	66.5	+7.5
Labour	Tayo Situ*	3,242	62.7	+5.0
Labour	Cleo Soanes	3,069	59.4	−2.2
Liberal Democrats	Ola Oyewunmi*	979	18.9	−38.3
Liberal Democrats	Joanne Whittington	727	14.1	+4.4
Liberal Democrats	Abdul Quddus	595	11.5	+2.3
Conservative	Martina Ward	470	9.1	+2.7
Conservative	Jane MacLaren	436	8.4	+1.8
Conservative	Joanna Sheilds	385	7.4	+0.8
Green	Esther Bunting	338	6.5	−2.1
Independent	Phil Bale	285	5.5	N/A
Green	Eugene Dugan-Brause	264	5.1	−2.9
Green	Louise Jefferies	218	4.2	−3.1
Turnout		5,169	53.3	+22.7
Labour hold		Swing		
Labour hold		Swing		
Labour hold		Swing		

Ola Oyewunmi was elected for Labour in 2006. The change in his vote is relative to his performance then as a Labour candidate, rather than the top Liberal Democrat candidate.

=== Peckham Rye ===
Peckham Rye
Party	Candidate	Votes	%	±%
Labour	Gavin Edwards	2,772	43.7	+0.8
Labour	Victoria Mills	2,559	40.4	+0.4
Labour	Renata Hamvas	2,422	38.2	+0.9
Liberal Democrats	Jennifer Blake	2,223	35.1	−0.8
Liberal Democrats	Alastair Bowman	2,067	32.6	+0.4
Liberal Democrats	Laurie Eggleston	1,878	29.6	−1.5
Conservative	Diana Atuona	933	14.7	+1.4
Conservative	Simon Kitchen	828	13.1	+0.4
Conservative	Andy Tuck	798	12.6	+0.6
Green	Rachel Fleming	667	10.5	−11.5
Green	Gerald Bennett	655	10.3	N/A
Green	Jason Evers	526	8.3	N/A
Turnout		6,336	67.1	+29.8
Labour hold		Swing		
Labour hold		Swing		
Labour hold		Swing		

=== Riverside ===
Riverside
Party	Candidate	Votes	%	±%
Liberal Democrats	Eliza Mann*	2,069	40.0	−3.0
Liberal Democrats	Nick Stanton*	2,013	38.5	−6.8
Liberal Democrats	Anood Al-Samerai*	1,927	36.9	−4.5
Conservative	Jonathan Fieldsend	1,431	27.4	+6.9
Conservative	Philip Walters	1,389	26.6	+6.5
Conservative	Oliver Ward	1,338	25.6	+7.3
Labour	Elizabeth Colebourne	1,282	24.5	−2.8
Labour	Aubyn Graham**	1,109	21.2	−1.4
Labour	Christopher Page**	1,095	20.1	−2.2
Green	Kate Smith	570	10.9	−5.8
Green	Neil Best	518	9.9	N/A
Turnout		5,226	54.2	+27.3
Liberal Democrats hold		Swing		
Liberal Democrats hold		Swing		
Liberal Democrats hold		Swing		

Aubyn Graham was a sitting councillor for Peckham Rye ward

Christopher Page was a sitting councillor for Camberwell Green ward

=== Rotherhithe ===
Rotherhithe
Party	Candidate	Votes	%	±%
Liberal Democrats	Jeffrey Hook*	1,719	36.6	−10.1
Liberal Democrats	Wilma Nelson*	1,695	36.1	−11.9
Liberal Democrats	Columba Blango*	1,590	33.9	−10.0
Labour	Christopher Brown	1,389	29.6	+4.1
Labour	Kath Whittam	1,343	28.6	+3.4
Labour	Anthony Squires	1,180	25.1	+3.3
Conservative	Simon Hodge	861	18.3	+1.2
Conservative	Percy Gray	825	17.6	+2.1
Conservative	Matt Hinxman	815	17.4	+2.2
Green	Zoe Young	504	10.1	−0.1
Independent	Kathy Hennessy	467	9.9	N/A
Independent	Jerry Hewitt	414	8.8	N/A
Independent	Patrick Horan	299	6.4	N/A
Turnout		4,695	53.4	+25.2
Liberal Democrats hold		Swing		
Liberal Democrats hold		Swing		
Liberal Democrats hold		Swing		

=== South Bermondsey ===
South Bermondsey
Party	Candidate	Votes	%	±%
Liberal Democrats	Michael Bukola	1,615	37.1	−11.1
Liberal Democrats	Paul Kyriacou*	1,614	37.0	−8.9
Liberal Democrats	Graham Neale	1,604	36.8	−7.6
Labour	Pat Alden	1,474	33.8	+7.1
Labour	Ade Lasaki*	1,416	32.5	−11.9
Labour	Cormac Hollingsworth	1,400	32.1	+6.8
Conservative	Gary Bland	722	16.6	+3.7
Conservative	David Pilkington	586	13.4	+2.3
Conservative	Bill Rees	568	13.0	+2.5
BNP	Nigel Seary	442	10.1	N/A
Green	Emma Bushell	422	9.7	−1.5
Green	Jayne Forbes	230	5.3	−4.7
Turnout		4,358	50.8	+23.6
Liberal Democrats hold		Swing		
Liberal Democrats hold		Swing		
Liberal Democrats hold		Swing		

Ade Lasaki was elected as a Liberal Democrat in 2006. The change in his vote is relative to his performance then as a Liberal Democrat, rather than the second-placed Labour candidate.

=== South Camberwell ===
South Camberwell
Party	Candidate	Votes	%	±%
Labour	Veronica Ward*	2,688	49.7	+9.9
Labour	Stephen Govier	2,541	47.0	+13.5
Labour	Peter John*	2,502	46.2	+8.4
Liberal Democrats	Christian Blango	1,509	27.9	+16.2
Green	Jenny Jones*	1,282	23.7	−11.4
Liberal Democrats	Colin Hunte	943	17.4	+6.5
Liberal Democrats	Mariam Sannoh	872	16.1	+7.5
Conservative	Simon Fox	835	15.4	−0.1
Green	Eleanor Margolies	822	15.2	−16.5
Conservative	Oliver Wooller	712	13.2	−1.5
Green	Thomas Tibbits	683	12.6	−16.2
Conservative	Alice Ukoko	628	11.6	−1.3
Turnout		5,440	63.5	+29.7
Labour hold		Swing		
Labour gain from Green		Swing		
Labour hold		Swing		

=== Surrey Docks ===
Surrey Docks
Party	Candidate	Votes	%	±%
Liberal Democrats	David Hubber*	2,385	48.0	+3.5
Liberal Democrats	Paul Noblet*	2,310	46.5	+4.6
Liberal Democrats	Lisa Rajan*	1,986	40.0	−0.8
Conservative	Laura Collins	1,463	29.4	−0.3
Conservative	Catherine Crook	1,331	26.8	−1.6
Conservative	Dominic Roberts	1,259	25.3	−1.6
Labour	John Percival	942	18.9	+1.1
Labour	Fran Rawcliffe	902	18.1	+2.6
Labour	Robert Smeath**	788	15.9	+2.2
Green	George Raszka	445	9.0	−4.5
Independent	John Hellings	185	3.7	−11.8
Turnout		4,971	55.4	+27.9
Liberal Democrats hold		Swing		
Liberal Democrats hold		Swing		
Liberal Democrats hold		Swing		

Robert Smeath was a sitting councillor for Peckham Rye ward

=== The Lane ===
The Lane
Party	Candidate	Votes	%	±%
Labour	Mark Glover*	3,163	50.9	+0.5
Labour	Nick Dolezal	3,120	50.2	+4.0
Labour	Keadean Rhoden	2,567	41.3	−0.1
Liberal Democrats	Lorna Freeman	1,622	26.1	+9.0
Green	Tom Chance	1,265	20.4	−3.0
Liberal Democrats	Julie Glover	1,240	20.0	+4.2
Liberal Democrats	Jon Phillips	998	16.1	+0.4
Green	Anna Plodowski	908	14.6	−3.4
Conservative	Rebecca Foreman	761	12.3	−1.2
Conservative	Alan MacLeod	731	11.8	−1.1
Conservative	Gerald Chan	705	11.3	−1.5
Green	Remco Van Der Stoep	586	9.4	−7.3
Turnout		6,212	59.0	+27.9
Labour hold		Swing		
Labour hold		Swing		
Labour hold		Swing		

=== Village ===
Village
Party	Candidate	Votes	%	±%
Liberal Democrats	Robin Hilton*	2,376	36.2	+6.2
Conservative	Toby Eckersley*	2,217	33.8	−11.2
Conservative	Andrew Mitchell	2,168	33.0	−9.4
Conservative	David Bradbury	2,156	32.9	−6.1
Labour	Kate Cinamon	1,911	29.1	−4.5
Liberal Democrats	Christian Mitchell	1,852	28.2	+17.3
Liberal Democrats	John Hedley	1,829	27.9	+18.4
Labour	Duncan Chapman	1,793	27.3	−10.3
Labour	Julia Rowley	1,638	25.0	−6.7
Green	Robert Goodman	929	14.2	−1.9
Green	Dee Hammond	469	7.1	−5.5
Turnout		6,563	74.2	+22.6
Liberal Democrats gain from Conservative		Swing		
Conservative hold		Swing		
Conservative hold		Swing		

Robin Hilton was elected as a Conservative in 2006. The change in her vote is relative to her performance then as a Conservative, rather than the top Liberal Democrat candidate.

== By-Elections 2010–2014 ==
Brunswick Park by-election, 10 March 2011
Party	Candidate	Votes	%	±%
Labour	Mark Williams	1,981	65.1	+10.6
Liberal Democrats	Kate Heywood	630	20.7	−3.2
Green	Jenny Bentall	231	7.6	−6.7
Conservative	Simon Kitchen	129	4.2	−7.3
TUSC	Brian Kelly	70	2.3	N/A
Turnout		3,041	34.2	−24.1
Labour hold		Swing		

The by-election was called following the resignation of Cllr Friary.

The Lane by-election, 5 May 2011
Party	Candidate	Votes	%	±%
Labour	Rowenna Davis	2,670	64.4	+23.1
Green	Anna Plodowski	472	11.4	−3.2
Liberal Democrats	Alex Berhanu	471	11.4	−14.7
Conservative	Simon Fox	423	10.2	−2.1
TUSC	Brian Kelly	107	2.6	N/A
Turnout		4,143	39.6	−17.3
Labour hold		Swing		

The by-election was called following the resignation of Cllr Rhoden.

Peckham by-election, 7 July 2011
Party	Candidate	Votes	%	±%
Labour	Chris Brown	1,754	70.1	+7.4
Liberal Democrats	Jennifer Blake	554	22.1	+3.2
Conservative	Diana Atuona	86	3.4	−5.7
TUSC	Brian Kelly	63	2.5	N/A
Green	Jason Harvey-Evers	46	1.8	−4.7
Turnout		2,503	25.5	−27.8
Labour hold		Swing		

The by-election was called following the death of Cllr Situ.

East Walworth by-election, 29 November 2012
Party	Candidate	Votes	%	±%
Labour	Rebecca Lury	1,259	53.4	+10.4
Liberal Democrats	Ben Johnson	1,003	42.6	+2.5
Conservative	Stuart Millson	94	4.0	−8.0
Turnout		2,357	25.4	−31.1
Labour hold		Swing		

The by-election was called following the death of Cllr Morrissey.
