= German Marshall Fund =

American think tank

The German Marshall Fund of the United States

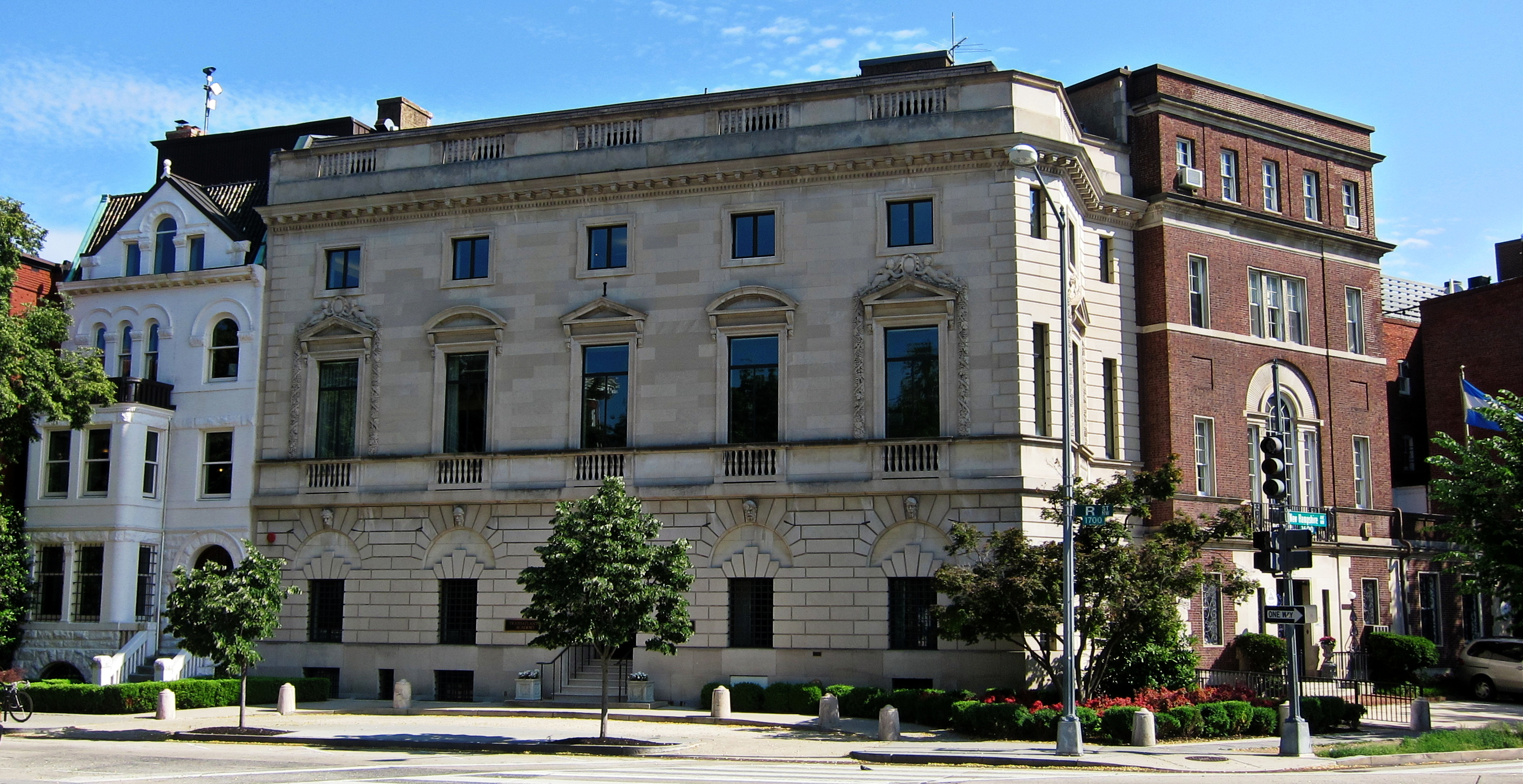
- GMF headquarters in Washington, D.C.
- Abbreviation: GMF
- Formation: June 5, 1972; 54 years ago
- Type: 501(c)(3) organization
- Tax ID no.: 52-0954751
- Headquarters: 1744 R Street NW
- Location: Washington, D.C.
- President: Alexandra de Hoop Scheffer
- Website: www.gmfus.org

The German Marshall Fund of the United States (GMF) is a non-partisan American public policy think tank that seeks to promote cooperation and understanding between North America and the European Union.

Founded in 1972, through a gift from the West German government on the 25th anniversary of the Marshall Plan, GMF contributes research and analysis on transatlantic and global issues; convenes policy and business leaders at international conferences; provides exchange opportunities for emerging American and European leaders; and supports initiatives that can strengthen democracies. GMF focuses on policy, leadership, and civil society.

GMF is headquartered in Washington, D.C., and has offices in Berlin, Brussels, Ankara, Belgrade, Bucharest, Paris, and Warsaw.

== History ==
=== Foundation ===
GMF was founded as a permanent memorial to Marshall Plan assistance through a grant from the West German government. It was founded by Guido Goldman, who was the director of Harvard's West European Studies program in the early 1970s. Goldman, an American whose family had fled Germany in 1940, lobbied the West German government, particularly Finance Minister Alex Möller for an endowment to promote European and U.S. relations on the 25th anniversary of Marshall Plan aid. Working with a planning group that was to constitute the fund's initial board of trustees – including physicist Harvey Brooks, diplomat Robert Ellsworth, journalist Max Franke, economist Richard N. Cooper, and educator Howard Swearer – Goldman eventually received an agreement to support an independent institution in 1971.

German Chancellor Willy Brandt, announced the creation of GMF in a speech on June 5, 1972, at Harvard, saying that it would help increase U.S.–European cooperation and mutual understanding. Brandt wrote four years later:

My government wanted to mark the 25th anniversary of the launching of the Marshall Plan with something more than just a friendly word of remembrance ... I myself announced that the federal government had, with parliamentary approval, resolved to make resources available for a Marshall Memorial Fund. The sum was to provide backing for American-European studies and research projects.

Other charter members of the board of trustees included economist Carl Kaysen, judge Arlin Adams, and businessman Donald M. Kendall. The first president, selected in 1973, was Benjamin H. Read, who was later to become U.S. Under Secretary of State for Management.

=== Early development ===
In the 1970s and 1980s, GMF disbursed grants in accordance with its mission, including to academic researchers and to the Public Broadcasting Service and National Public Radio. It also provided the initial funding for the Institute for International Economics, now the Peterson Institute for International Economics. By 1977, the organization had spent more than $7 million on nearly 100 projects involving the United States, West Germany, France, Britain, Italy, Sweden, Belgium, Denmark, the Netherlands, Norway, Switzerland, Japan and Canada. Academic Michael Naumann has said that GMF was one of the first think tanks to focus on the importance of soft power at a time when most academic focus was on military issues.

In 1980, GMF opened its first European office in Bonn. In 1985, the West German government renewed its grant to GMF. In 1987, George Kennan gave the keynote address at a conference organized in West Berlin by GMF to commemorate the 40th anniversary of the Marshall Plan. Also in the 1980s, GMF supported programs such as a National Governors Association initiative to tackle acid rain, and began to work actively with the democracy movements of Central and Eastern Europe through the funding of small grants.

=== Post-1989 expansion ===
In 2002, GMF conducted its first survey, along with the Chicago Council on Global Affairs. The next year, it was renamed Transatlantic Trends, and became an annual indicator of public opinion on both sides of the Atlantic. GMF established its Transatlantic Fellows program to enable permanent resident expertise on global public policy issues. It also founded the Transatlantic Academy for visiting scholars, and initiated the Transatlantic Take commentary series. GMF's exchange programs also expanded with the addition of American Marshall Memorial Fellows, the initiation of the Manfred Worner Seminar for defense specialists, and the establishment of the Congress-Bundestag Forum.

In March 2018, the foundation was declared an "undesirable organization" in Russia.

== Current programs ==
GMF programs include the Alliance for Securing Democracy, the Brussels Forum, Atlantic Dialogues, Transatlantic Academy, and the Transatlantic Trends Survey.

=== Brussels Forum ===
Brussels Forum is an annual meeting of influential U.S., European, and global political, corporate, and intellectual leaders in Brussels. Participants include heads of state and government, senior officials from the European Union institutions and the member states, U.S. cabinet officials, congressional representatives, parliamentarians, academics, and media.

=== Atlantic Dialogues ===
The Atlantic Dialogues is an annual event in Morocco involving around 300 high-level public- and private-sector leaders from around the Atlantic Basin, including Africa and Latin America. Topics of discussion include cross-regional issues ranging from security to economics, migration to energy.

== Leadership ==
- Benjamin H. Read, President 1973–1977
- Robert Gerald Livingston, President 1977–1981
- Frank E. Loy, President 1981–1995
- Craig Kennedy, President 1996–2014
- Karen Donfried, President 2014-2021
- Heather Conley, President 2021-2024
- Alexandra de Hoop Scheffer, President since April 2025

== See also ==
- Atlantic Council
- Atlantik-Brücke
