= Karen Donfried =

American diplomat

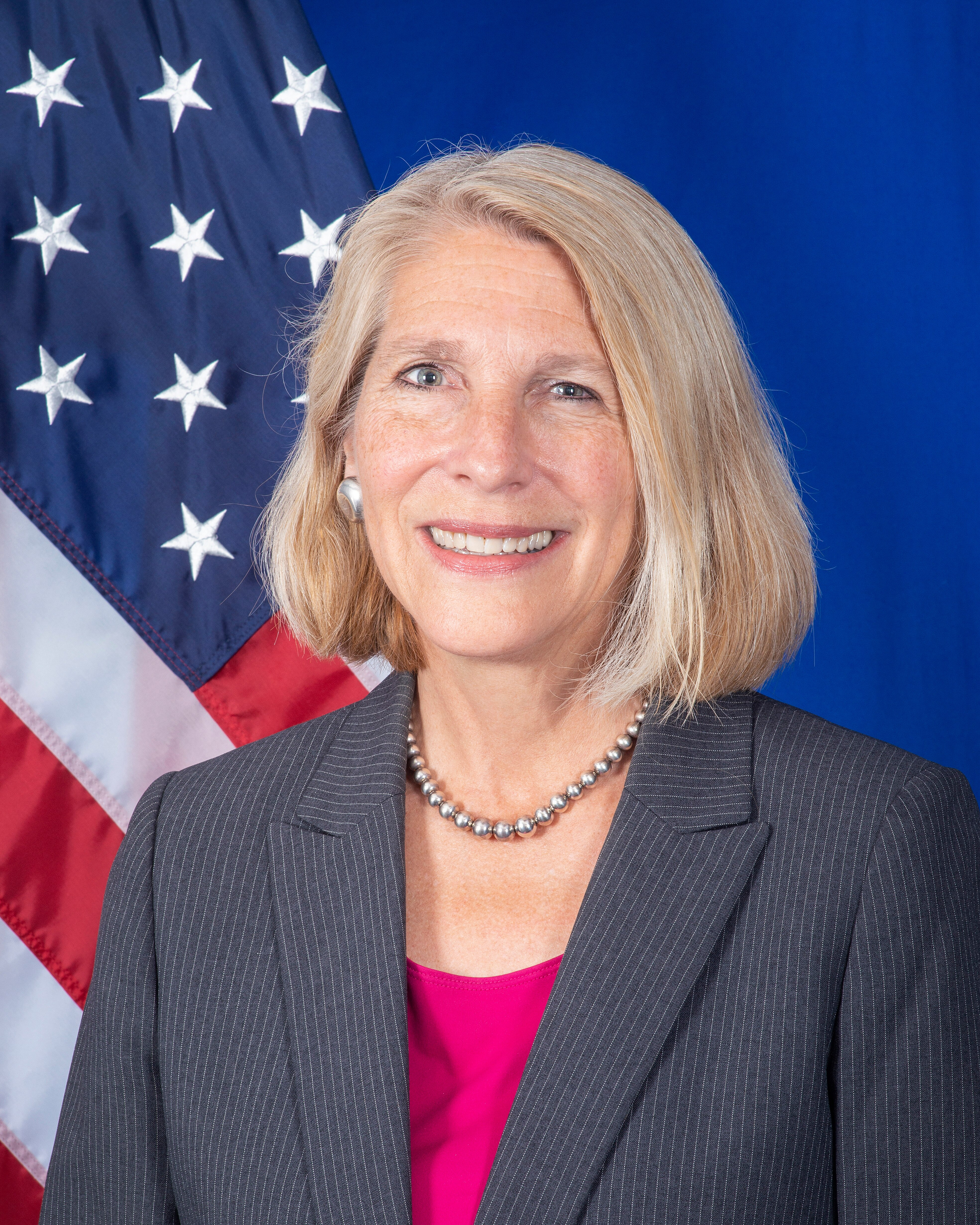
- Official portrait, 2021

8th Director of the Congressional Research Service
- Incumbent
- Assumed office September 23, 2024
- Preceded by: Robert Newlen

27th Assistant Secretary of State for European and Eurasian Affairs
- In office September 30, 2021 – March 31, 2023
- President: Joe Biden
- Preceded by: A. Wess Mitchell
- Succeeded by: James C. O'Brien

President of the German Marshall Fund
- In office April 2014 – September 2021
- Preceded by: Craig Kennedy
- Succeeded by: Heather Conley

Personal details
- Spouse: Alan Untereiner (m. 1988)
- Relations: Karl Paul Donfried (father)
- Education: Wesleyan University (BA); Tufts University (MA, PhD); LMU Munich (Mgr)
- Awards: Italian Order of Merit; German Order of Merit; Belgian Order of the Crown; Superior Honor Award

Karen Erika Donfried is an American foreign policy expert who previously served as the Assistant Secretary of State for European and Eurasian Affairs. The State Department announced in March 2023 that Donfried would be stepping down from her post at the end of the month. She also served as president of the German Marshall Fund from April 2014 to September 2021.

== Early life and education ==
Donfried was born as daughter to Karl P. Donfried and Katherine E. Donfried at Amherst, Massachusetts and spent her early childhood in Heidelberg, Germany. Her father was a professor of religion at Smith College, and her mother was the owner of an automobile parts company.

Donfried obtained her bachelor's degree in government from Wesleyan University. At Wesleyan, she was elected to Phi Beta Kappa. She later obtained her master's degree and PhD from the Fletcher School of Law and Diplomacy at Tufts University, and as well as a magister from LMU Munich. Donfried is fluent in German.

== Career ==
Donfried served for ten years as a European specialist at the Congressional Research Service. She joined the German Marshall Fund in 2001. From 2003 to 2005, Donfried worked on the U.S. State Department's Policy Planning Staff. In 2005, she returned to the German Marshall Fund to serve as senior director of policy programs and later as executive vice president until 2010. Afterwards, Donfried worked as the national intelligence officer for Europe on the National Intelligence Council. At NIO, she directed and drafted strategic analysis for senior policymakers.

After NIO, Donfried worked at the National Security Council as a special assistant to the president and senior director for European affairs. In April 2014, Donfried became the first female president of the German Marshall Fund. Since 2019, Donfried has been co-chairing on the Transatlantic Task Force of the German Marshall Fund and the Bundeskanzler-Helmut-Schmidt-Stiftung (BKHS), alongside Wolfgang Ischinger.

On March 26, 2021, President Joe Biden nominated Donfried as Assistant Secretary of State for European and Eurasian Affairs. The Senate Foreign Relations Committee held hearings on her nomination on July 20, 2021. The committee favorably reported her nomination on August 4, 2021. Donfried was confirmed by the entire Senate on September 28, 2021, by a vote of 73–26.

On September 10, 2024, the Library of Congress announced Donfried's appointment as director of the Congressional Research Service, effective September 23, 2024.

== Other activities ==
- Council on Foreign Relations, Member
- American Council on Germany (ACG), Member
- Foreign Affairs Policy Board, Member
- Paris School of International Affairs (PSIA), Member of the Strategic Committee
- World Economic Forum (WEF), Member of the Europe Policy Group (since 2017)
- World Economic Forum (WEF), Member of the Global Future Council on the Future of Regional Governance

== Awards ==
Donfried became an officer of the Order of Merit of the Italian Republic in 2018, received the Cross of the Order of Merit from the German government in 2011, became an officer of the Order of the Crown of Belgium in 2010, and received a Superior Honor Award from the U.S. Department of State in 2005 for her contribution to revitalizing the transatlantic partnership.

== Personal life ==
Donfried married Alan Untereiner, a graduate of Harvard College and Yale Law School, in June 1988. Donfried speaks German.
