= Julian Popov =

- Юлиан Попов
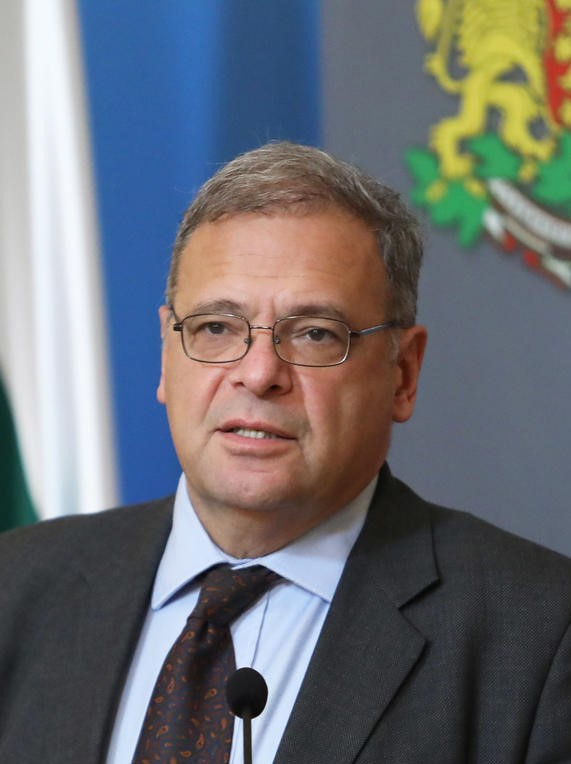
- Popov in 2023

Minister of Environment and Waters
- In office 6 June 2023 – 9 April 2024
- Prime Minister: Nikolai Denkov
- Preceded by: Rositsa Blagova
- Succeeded by: Petar Dimitrov
- In office 13 March 2013 – 29 May 2013
- Prime Minister: Marin Raykov
- Preceded by: Nona Karadzhova
- Succeeded by: Iskra Mihaylova

Personal details
- Born: Julian Georgiev Popov; 21 September 1959 (age 67) Sofia, PR Bulgaria
- Education: Sofia University
- Occupation: Journalist; author; politician

Julian Georgiev Popov (Bulgarian: Юлиан Георгиев Попов; born 21 September 1959) is a Bulgarian-British, politician, public figure and writer.

Popov is the author of the book English Bulgaria or Switzerland in the Balkans (2004), the novel Island of Mists (2006), co-author of the books "The European Supergrid" and "Energy and Climate Diplomacy" and of many comment and opinion articles on energy policies, European integration, low-carbon economy and international relations for the Bulgarian, British (BBC Three, The Independent, Financial Times, Huffington Post, The Scotsman), Polish and other European media, as well as for Al Jazeera. He has also been an advocate for minority groups in Bulgaria, starting a campaign to remove a racist anti-Roma group from Facebook and writing articles (for instance for Al Jazeera) on the maltreatment of Roma minority in Bulgaria and across Europe.

He is fellow of the European Climate Foundation, chairman of the Board of Directors of the Buildings Performance Institute Europe, chairman of the Board of the "Elizabeth Kostova Foundation" for creative writing, and until becoming Cabinet Minister in 2013 served as chairman of the Board of the Bulgarian School of Politics and as a member of the board of the American University in Bulgaria. He is a member of the Board of Trustees of the New Bulgarian University and Director and Treasurer of the British charity Friends of Bulgaria. He was also the founding CEO of the New Bulgarian University where he introduced distance education to Bulgaria. In 2006 he created the first political blog in the Bulgarian language.

Popov was appointed the Minister of Environment and Water in the caretaker Raykov Government on 13 March 2013. He left office on 29 May of that year.

In 2016 he was recognised as one of the 40 most influential voices in European energy policy under N24 by the Brussels media service EurActiv.

In 2023 he was nominated as potential Deputy Prime Minister and Minister of Environment by the PP-DB coalition (who had obtained second place in the general elections). He was appointed as Minister of Environment and Water of Bulgaria
