= Bermondsey and Old Southwark =

UK Parliament constituency (since 2010)

Coordinates: 51.49°N 0.07°W

- Borough constituency for the House of Commons
- Interactive map of boundaries from 2024
- Location within Greater London
- County: Greater London
- Population: 109,200 (2022)
- Electorate: 70,602 (March 2020)

Current constituency
- Created: 2010
- Member of Parliament: Neil Coyle (Labour)
- Seats: One
- Created from: North Southwark and Bermondsey

Bermondsey and Old Southwark is a constituency (Note: A borough constituency (for the purposes of election expenses and type of returning officer).) in the House of Commons of the UK Parliament. (Note: As with all constituencies, the constituency elects one Member of Parliament (MP) by the first past the post system of election at least every five years.) Since 2015, it has been represented by Neil Coyle of the Labour Party. He was suspended from the party in February 2022 following an accusation of racism, but reinstated in May 2023.

== Constituency profile ==
Comprising the northern part of the London Borough of Southwark, the constituency lies immediately to the south of the City of London. It includes the areas of Bermondsey, Southwark, Rotherhithe and parts of Elephant and Castle.

The constituency contains a number of London landmarks including the southern ends of London Bridge and Tower Bridge, Borough Market, Shakespeare's Globe and The Shard, the tallest building in the country. The area was historically associated with manufacturing and trade, but has now been redeveloped with commercial properties and contemporary housing.

Residents of the constituency are generally young, unmarried and have high levels of education and professional employment compared to London averages. They have low levels of car and home ownership. The constituency is ethnically diverse; 34% are White British, 19% identify as Other White, 18% are Black and 13% are Asian. At 9.4% of the population, Bermondsey and Old Southwark has the fourth-highest proportion of LGB+ people in the country.

At the most recent borough council election in 2022, Southwark and Rotherhithe elected Liberal Democrat councillors, whilst the area between them, including Bermondsey, elected primarily Labour Party councillors. At the 2016 referendum on European Union membership, voters in the constituency overwhelmingly voted to remain in the EU. It is estimated that 73% opposed Brexit, making the constituency one of the top 25 most remain-supporting constituencies out of 650 nationwide.

== History and boundaries ==
=== 2010–2024 ===
Map of boundaries 2010-2024

The seat was created for the 2010 general election, based on the 1997–2010 North Southwark and Bermondsey constituency previously held by Simon Hughes from the 1997 general election, on a review of parliamentary representation in London by the Boundary Commission for England facing very minor boundary changes. Following the 2002 redrawing of ward boundaries, parts of Faraday and Livesey wards that were part of North Southwark and Bermondsey transferred to Camberwell and Peckham.

The new seat was created from the following electoral wards within the London Borough of Southwark: Cathedrals, Chaucer, East Walworth, Grange, Newington, Riverside, Rotherhithe, South Bermondsey, Surrey Docks.

The constituency lies within the London Borough of Southwark. Prior to the 2023 boundary changes, it contained the Old Southwark area of the former Metropolitan Borough of Southwark and the neighbourhoods of Borough, London Bridge and Bankside. Within the constituency are Elephant and Castle, Walworth and Newington which were part of the old Metropolitan Borough. The eastern half of the seat includes Bermondsey and Rotherhithe which were part of the former Metropolitan Borough of Bermondsey, and which had been a separate constituency also.

=== Current ===
Following the 2023 review of Westminster constituencies, which came into effect for the 2024 general election, the constituency is composed of the following wards of the London Borough of Southwark (as they existed on 1 December 2020):

- Borough & Bankside; Chaucer; London Bridge & West Bermondsey; North Bermondsey; Rotherhithe; St. George's; South Bermondsey; Surrey Docks.

The contents reflect the new ward structure which became effective in May 2018. To bring the electorate within the permitted range, Newington was transferred to Vauxhall and Camberwell Green, and North Walworth was transferred to Peckham.

== Members of Parliament ==
Note: the first MP was elected for predecessor Bermondsey seats continuously from a by-election in 1983 until the seat was created in 2010: see the former constituency of North Southwark and Bermondsey.

Election	Member	Party
2010	Sir Simon Hughes	Liberal Democrat
2015	Neil Coyle	Labour
February 2022	Neil Coyle	Independent
May 2023	Neil Coyle	Labour

== Elections ==
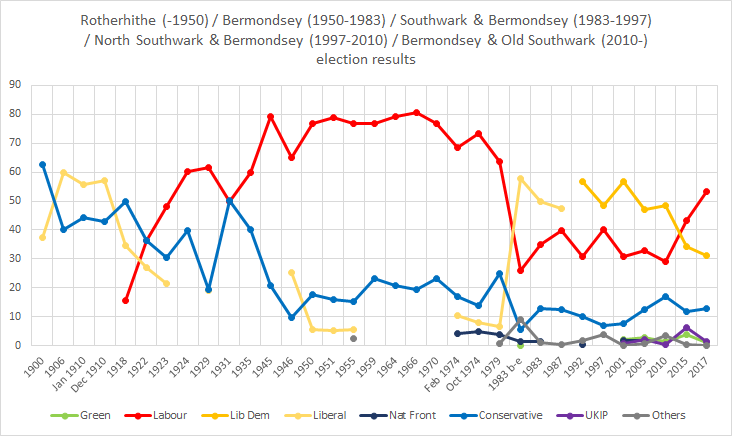
Bermondsey historical election results

=== Elections in the 2020s ===
General election 2024: Bermondsey and Old Southwark
Party	Candidate	Votes	%	±%
Labour	Neil Coyle	16,857	44.8	▼4.8
Liberal Democrats	Rachel Bentley	9,070	24.1	▼7.0
Green	Susan Hunter	4,477	11.9	▲11.8
Reform	Tony Sharp	3,397	9.0	▲6.6
Conservative	Jonathan Iliff	2,879	7.7	▼9.1
Independent	Piers Corbyn	403	1.1	new
Independent	Niko Omilana	273	0.7	new
Independent	Barry Duckett	247	0.7	new
Majority		7,787	20.7	▲2.1
Turnout		37,603	54.1	▼10.9
Registered electors		69,473		
Labour hold		Swing	▲1.1	

=== Elections in the 2010s ===
2019 notional result (Note: Estimate of the 2019 general election result as if the revised boundaries recommended under the 2023 boundary review were in place)
Party	Vote	%
Labour	22,776	49.6
Liberal Democrats	14,261	31.1
Conservative	7,710	16.8
Brexit Party	1,113	2.4
Green	25	0.1
Majority	8,515	18.6
Turnout	45,885	65.0
Electorate	70,602	

General election 2019: Bermondsey and Old Southwark
Party	Candidate	Votes	%	±%
Labour	Neil Coyle	31,723	54.1	+0.9
Liberal Democrats	Humaira Ali	15,597	26.6	–4.5
Conservative	Andrew Baker	9,678	16.5	+3.6
Brexit Party	Alex Matthews	1,617	2.8	N/A
Majority		16,126	27.5	+5.3
Turnout		58,615	62.9	–4.2
Registered electors		93,248		
Labour hold		Swing	+2.7	

General election 2017: Bermondsey and Old Southwark
Party	Candidate	Votes	%	±%
Labour	Neil Coyle	31,161	53.2	+10.2
Liberal Democrats	Simon Hughes	18,189	31.1	–3.3
Conservative	Siobhan Baillie	7,581	13.0	+1.2
UKIP	Elizabeth Jones	838	1.4	–4.9
Green	John Tyson	639	1.1	–2.8
Independent	James Clarke	113	0.2	N/A
Majority		12,972	22.2	+13.4
Turnout		58,521	67.0	+5.3
Registered electors		87,282		
Labour hold		Swing	+6.7	

General election 2015: Bermondsey and Old Southwark
Party	Candidate	Votes	%	±%
Labour	Neil Coyle	22,146	43.1	+13.8
Liberal Democrats	Simon Hughes	17,657	34.3	–14.0
Conservative	Jean-Paul Floru	6,051	11.8	–5.3
UKIP	Andy Beadle	3,254	6.3	+6.0
Green	Liam Lavin	2,023	3.9	+2.3
Left Unity	Kingsley Abrams	142	0.3	N/A
Independent	Lucy Hall	72	0.1	N/A
All People's Party	Donald Cole	59	0.1	N/A
Republican Socialist Party	Steve Freeman	20	0.0	–0.2
Majority		4,489	8.7	N/A
Turnout		51,424	61.7	+4.5
Registered electors		83,298		
Labour gain from Liberal Democrats		Swing	+13.9	

General election 2010: Bermondsey and Old Southwark
Party	Candidate	Votes	%	±%
Liberal Democrats	Simon Hughes	21,590	48.4	+0.7
Labour Co-op	Val Shawcross	13,060	29.2	–2.7
Conservative	Loanna Morrison	7,638	17.1	+4.2
BNP	Stephen Tyler	1,370	3.1	N/A
Green	Tom Chance	718	1.6	–1.4
UKIP	Alan Kirkby	155	0.3	–1.7
Independent	Steve Freeman	120	0.3	N/A
Majority		8,530	19.1	+3.5
Turnout		44,651	57.5	+8.0
Registered electors		77,998		
Liberal Democrats hold		Swing	+1.7	

2005 notional result
Party	Vote	%
Liberal Democrats	17,336	47.6
Labour	11,645	32.0
Conservative	4,689	12.9
Others	2,742	7.5
Turnout	36,412	49.2
Electorate	73,944	

== See also ==
- parliamentary constituencies in London
- Southwark London Borough Council elections
