= Columba Blango =

Columba Blango may refer to:

- Columba Blango (politician) (born 1956), Sierra Leonean politician and former decathlete
- Columba Blango (Paralympian) (born 1992), British parasports runner
