= South Bermondsey =

Coordinates: 51.488135°N 0.054652°W

- Location within Greater London
- Population: 13,780 (2011 Census.Ward)
- London borough: Southwark
- Ceremonial county: Greater London
- Region: London
- Country: England
- Sovereign state: United Kingdom
- Post town: LONDON
- Postcode district: SE15, SE16
- Dialling code: 020
- Police: Metropolitan
- Fire: London
- Ambulance: London
- UK Parliament: Bermondsey and Old Southwark
- London Assembly: Lambeth and Southwark

South Bermondsey is a small district in the London Borough of Southwark in southeast London, England. The area is served by South Bermondsey railway station, with a future station at Surrey Canal Road. Nearby neighbourhoods include New Cross, Bermondsey, Deptford, Rotherhithe and Peckham. It is the current home of Millwall F.C.

== History ==
In 2024, a billion pound redevelopment of South Bermondsey was announced.

== Governance ==
South Bermondsey is part of the Bermondsey and Old Southwark constituency for elections to the House of Commons of the United Kingdom. South Bermondsey is part of the South Bermondsey ward for elections to Southwark London Borough Council.
