= Champion Hill (ward) =

Electoral ward in Greater London, England

- Electoral ward for the Southwark London Borough Council
- Champion Hill ward boundaries since 2018
- Borough: Southwark
- County: Greater London
- Population: 9,219 (2021)
- Electorate: 6,762 (2022)
- Area: 0.8841 square kilometres (0.3414 sq mi)

Current electoral ward
- Created: 2018
- Councillors: 2
- Created from: South Camberwell
- GSS code: E05011097

Champion Hill is an electoral ward in the London Borough of Southwark. The ward was first used in the 2018 elections. It returns two councillors to Southwark London Borough Council.

== Southwark council elections ==
=== 2022 election ===
The election took place on 5 May 2022. The turnout of 60.7% was the highest of any electoral ward in Greater London.

2022 Southwark London Borough Council election: Champion Hill (2)
Party	Candidate	Votes	%	±%
Labour	Sarah King	1,629	65.7	▲1.0
Labour	Esme Hicks	1,610	64.9	▲6.6
Green	Michael Millar	535	21.6	▲5.9
Liberal Democrats	Columba Blango	311	12.5	▲1.8
Liberal Democrats	Jonathan Hunt	293	11.8	▼0.3
Conservative	Graham Davison	202	8.1	▲0.3
Conservative	Francis Truss	187	7.5	▼0.3
Turnout		2,481	36.69	+3.90
Labour hold		Swing		
Labour hold		Swing		

=== 2018 election ===
The election took place on 3 May 2018.

2018 Southwark London Borough Council election: Champion Hill (2)
Party	Candidate	Votes	%	±%
Labour	Sarah King	1,519	64.7	
Labour	Peter John	1,368	58.3	
Green	Michael Millar	368	15.7	
Green	Alexander Howard	329	14.0	
Liberal Democrats	Jonathan Hunt	283	12.1	
Liberal Democrats	Columba Blango	251	10.7	
Conservative	Fraser Schurer-Lewis	184	7.8	
Conservative	Francis Truss	184	7.8	
CPA	Ray Towey	71	3.0	
Turnout		2,348	32.79	
Labour win (new seat)				
Labour win (new seat)				
