= London Bridge and West Bermondsey =

- Electoral ward for the Southwark London Borough Council
- London Bridge and West Bermondsey ward boundaries since 2018
- Borough: Southwark
- County: Greater London
- Population: 15,097 (2021) (Note: 2021 Census data reported for 2022 ward boundaries)
- Electorate: 10,595 (2022)
- Area: 1.173 square kilometres (0.453 sq mi)

Current electoral ward
- Created: 2018
- Councillors: 3
- Created from: Chaucer, Grange, Riverside
- GSS code: E05011104

London Bridge and West Bermondsey is an electoral ward in the London Borough of Southwark. The ward was first used in the 2018 elections. It returns three councillors to Southwark London Borough Council.

== List of councillors ==
Term	Councillor	Party
2018–2022	Humaira Ali	Liberal Democrats
2018–2022	William Houngbo	Liberal Democrats
2018–2022	Damian Shaun O’Brien	Liberal Democrats
2022–present	Emily Hickson	Labour
2022–present	Sunil Chopra	Labour
2022–present	Sam Dalton	Labour

== Southwark council elections ==
=== 2022 election ===
The election took place on 5 May 2022.

2022 Southwark London Borough Council election: London Bridge and West Bermondsey
Party	Candidate	Votes	%	±%
Labour	Emily Hickson	1,716	48.3	▲6.1
Labour	Sunil Chopra	1,586	44.7	▲3.4
Labour	Sam Dalton	1,562	44.0	▲4.2
Liberal Democrats	William Houngbo	1,205	33.9	▼9.7
Liberal Democrats	Martina Moh	1,193	33.6	▼12.0
Liberal Democrats	Damian O'Brien	1,119	31.5	▼11.7
Green	Susan Hunter	495	13.9	▲6.6
Green	Dauphine Hymans	343	9.7	▲3.2
Green	Christopher Terrill	280	7.9	New
Conservative	Ralph Tiffin	262	7.4	▼2.5
Conservative	Oliver Ward	261	7.3	▼0.2
Conservative	Mohammed Okrekson	237	6.7	▼0.3
Turnout		3,552	33.53	+4.96
Labour gain from Liberal Democrats		Swing		
Labour gain from Liberal Democrats		Swing		
Labour gain from Liberal Democrats		Swing		

=== 2018 election ===
The election took place on 14 June 2018. It was originally scheduled for 3 May 2018 but was rescheduled due to the death of a candidate.

2018 Southwark London Borough Council election: London Bridge and West Bermondsey
Party	Candidate	Votes	%	±%
Liberal Democrats	Humaira Ali	1,340	45.6	
Liberal Democrats	William Houngbo	1,281	43.6	
Liberal Democrats	Damian O’Brien	1,270	43.2	
Labour	Julie Eyles	1,239	42.2	
Labour	John Batteson	1,215	41.3	
Labour	Joseph McDonagh	1,171	39.8	
Conservative	Richard Packer	291	9.9	
Conservative	Hannah Ginnett	221	7.5	
Green	Rubio Werner	215	7.3	
Conservative	Nathan Gay	205	7.0	
Green	John Creely	191	6.5	
Majority				
Turnout		2,939	28.57	
Liberal Democrats win (new seat)				
Liberal Democrats win (new seat)				
Liberal Democrats win (new seat)				
