= Nunhead =

Suburb of London Borough of Southwark, London

Coordinates: 51°27′44″N 0°03′03″W

- Suburb
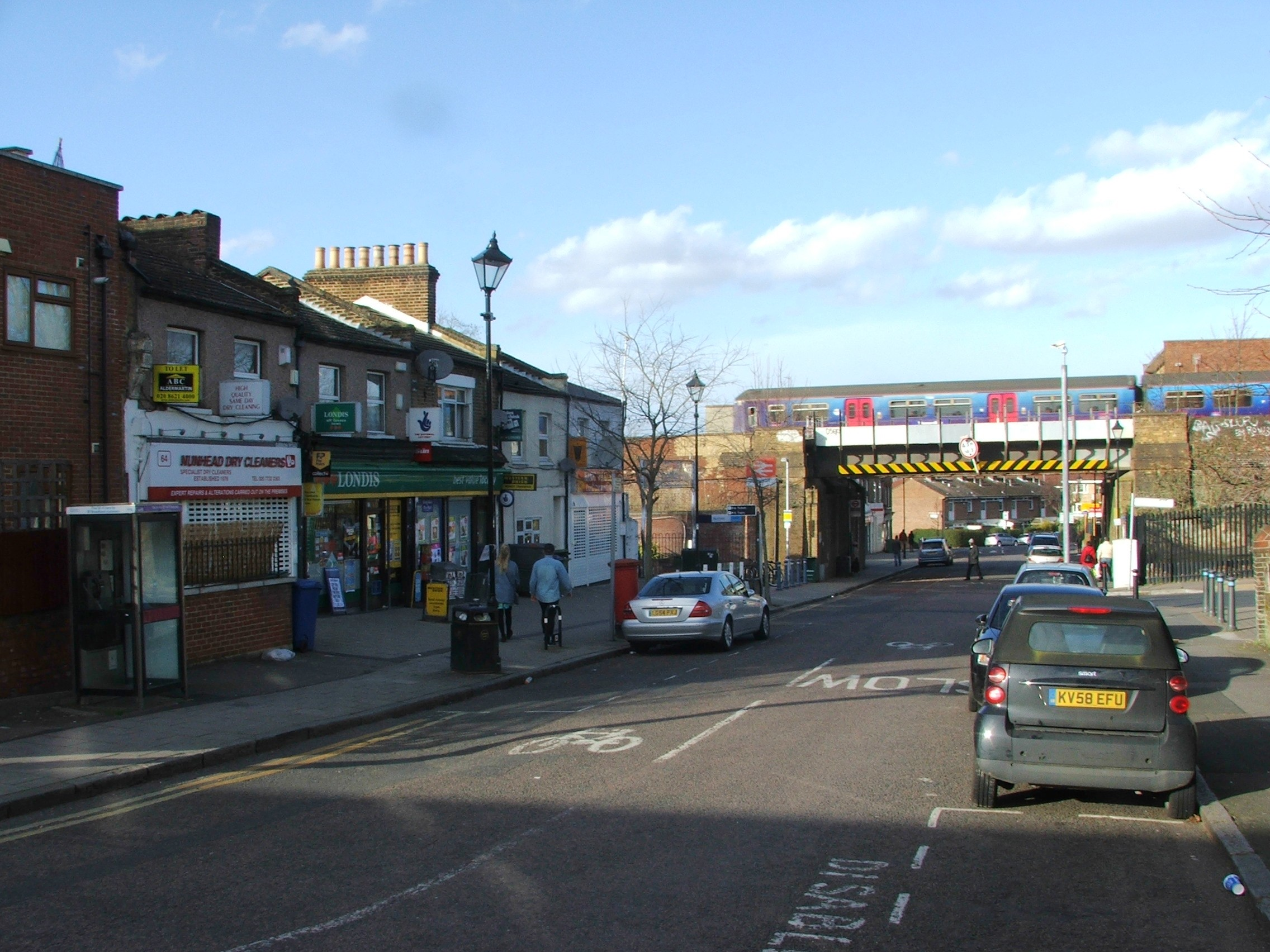
- Gibbon Road and Nunhead station

- Location within Greater London
- Population: 13,620 (2011 Census. Ward)
- OS grid reference: TQ355755
  - Charing Cross: 4 mi (6.4 km) NW
- London borough: Southwark
- Ceremonial county: Greater London
- Region: London
- Country: England
- Sovereign state: United Kingdom
- Post town: LONDON
- Postcode district: SE15, SE4
- Dialling code: 020
- Police: Metropolitan
- Fire: London
- Ambulance: London
- UK Parliament: Peckham
- London Assembly: Lambeth and Southwark

Nunhead (/ˈnʌnhɛd/) is an inner-city suburb in the London Borough of Southwark, England, 4 miles (6.4 km) southeast of Charing Cross. It is the location of the 52-acre (0.21 km^{2}) Nunhead Cemetery. Nunhead has traditionally been a working-class area, but is undergoing gentrification. It is the location of several underground reservoirs, built by the Southwark and Vauxhall Waterworks Company.

== Etymology ==
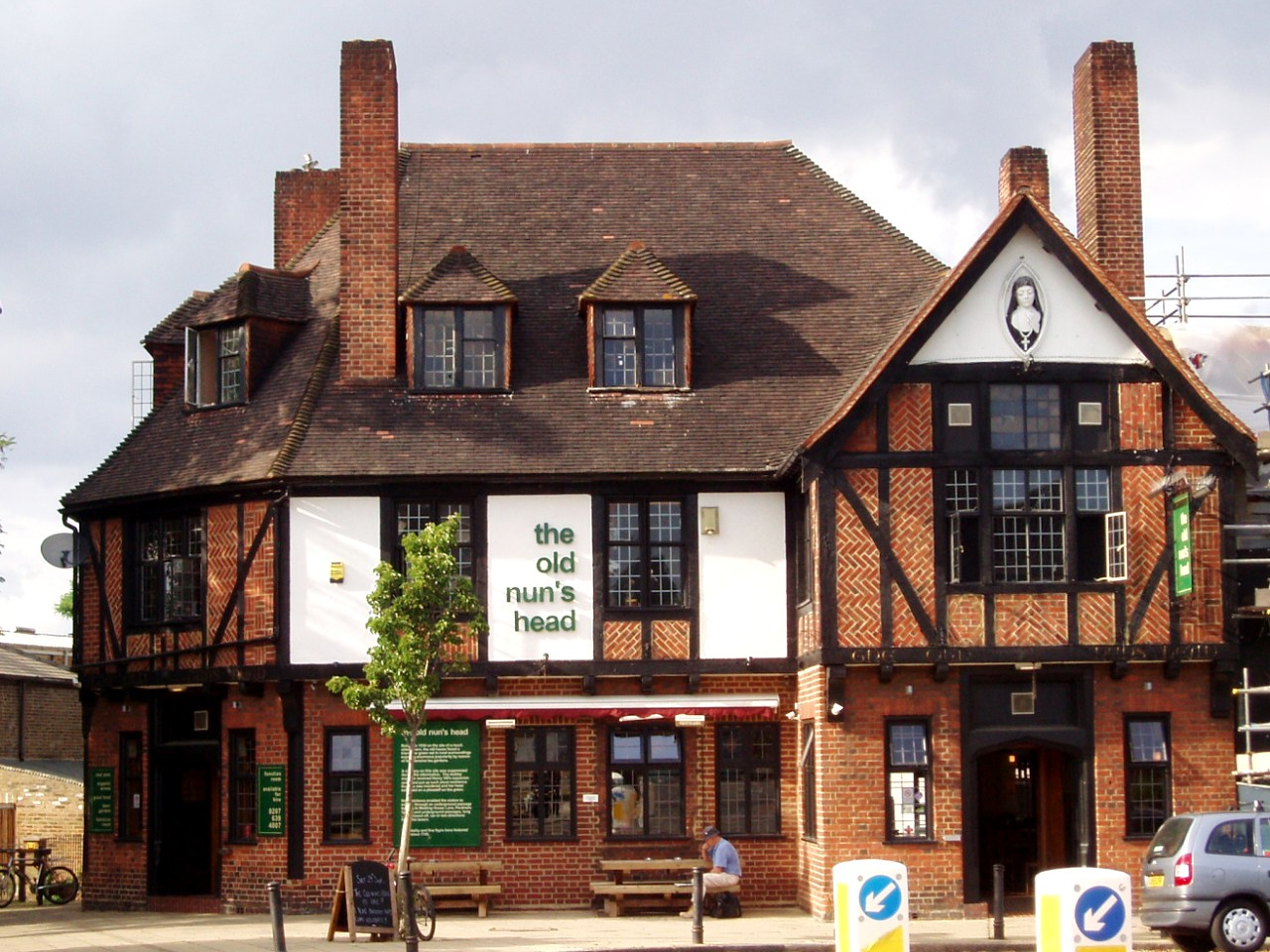
The Old Nuns Head, Public House

The name is first recorded in a deed of 1583 relating to a land sale including estates "lying at Nunn-head." The origin of the name Nunhead is not certain but is believed to be derived from a local inn named variously The Nun's Head or The Nunhead Tavern. Local historians and local legend maintain that this name refers to the beheading of a nun during the Dissolution of the Monasteries.

The legend claims that the head of the Mother Superior of a nunnery, which stood where the current public house The Old Nun's Head now stands, was placed on a spike on the green following her death. There is no evidence to support this claim. However, a nunnery in the area may have been connected with the nunnery of The Augustinian Priory of St. John the Baptist, Holywell (now Shoreditch) which acquired lands in Camberwell and Peckham in the 12th century.

== History ==
A map showing the Nunhead ward of Camberwell Metropolitan Borough as it appeared in 1916.

A rural settlement of approximately ten buildings named "NoneHead" is clearly visible in the 1762 map titled A topographical map of the county of Surrey by John Roque. The settlement occupies the land which is now Nunhead Green and Nunhead High Street. At the time it was separated from the nearby settlement of Peckham Rye by fields and the now covered River Peck.

In 1834 the Girdlers Company built the Beeston's Gift Almshouses, a terrace of seven Tudor-style cottages which still stand in front of a garden with railings on Consort road. Further almshouses were built in 1853 by the Asylum of the Metropolitan Beer and Wine Trade Association on the edge of Nunhead Green to provide housing for aged members of the trade. In 1868, Brocks Fireworks, a manufacturer of fireworks, built a firework 'manufactory' close to where the pub, The Pyrotechnists Arms, still stands. The pub is so-named because of its original proximity to the firework factory.

Until 1878, Nunhead formed part of the large ancient parish of Camberwell in the Brixton hundred of Surrey. The area's population growth led to a separate ecclesiastical parish of St Antholin, Nunhead, being formed in 1878, with the church built in 1877. The area then came within the area of responsibility of the Metropolitan Board of Works in 1855 and was transferred to the County of London in 1889. In 1887 Nunhead is recorded as having a population of 10,727. Having formed part of the Camberwell parish, it became part of the Metropolitan Borough of Camberwell in 1900.

There was a Nunhead Football Club from 1888 to 1949. Nunhead has some fine examples of late Victorian/early Edwardian properties; these can be seen on both Carden Road and Tresco Road. It is even reputed, in Claire Tomalin's biography of Charles Dickens' mistress Nelly Ternan, that Charles Dickens was taken on his death bed from the house he rented for Ternan, at Windsor Lodge in Linden Grove to Gad's Hill to die. The house no longer stands, but was at 31 Linden Grove. Old maps show that the church was next door to where the dental surgery now stands at 42 Linden Grove, so Windsor Lodge was presumably more or less opposite that.

== St Antholin's, Nunhead ==
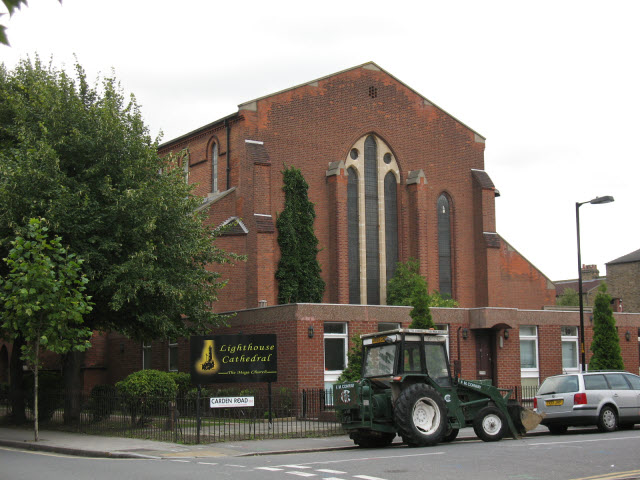
The Lighthouse Cathedral, the former Anglican St Antholin's

St Antholin church was built in 1877. Built in red brick it is large and rectangular and was built in the style of the first part of the 13th century. The church was built with funds from the sale of the site of St. Antholin's, Budge Row, which was demolished in 1875. The oak reredos designed by Sir Christopher Wren and a bell were brought from the original church. The church was damaged by bombing in 1940 and later restored by Lawrence King. The church was reconsecrated in 1957 and officially renamed St Antony's Church in 1958.

St Antony's was Listed Grade II in 1972 but became surplus to requirements of the Anglican Church and was declared redundant in 2001 and sold to its present owners, a Pentecostal congregation. It then became the Lighthouse Cathedral. The bell from the original St Antholin's now hangs in St Silas, Nunhead.

== Regeneration ==
Nunhead forms part of Southwark London Borough Council's Peckham Programme regeneration scheme. As part of this plan, the area forms part of the East Peckham and Nunhead renewal area. A component was the proposal that the Cross River Tram could serve the area. However, in November 2008, Mayor of London Boris Johnson announced that due to funding constraints this project would be cancelled.

== Nearest places ==
- East Dulwich
- Brockley
- Peckham
- New Cross Gate
- Telegraph Hill

== Transport ==
Nunhead railway station is located on Gibbon Road. It is on the line from Blackfriars to Sevenoaks and Victoria to Dartford. Services are provided by Southeastern and Thameslink. The area is also served by a variety of London Buses services. Bus route 78 starts in Nunhead and terminates in Shoreditch running via the commercial area surrounding Liverpool Street as well as going over famous Tower Bridge and bypassing the historical Tower of London. The P12, which begins its journey in Honor Oak Park, goes through Nunhead, terminating at Surrey Quays shopping centre. As part of the urban sprawl of London, Nunhead is contiguous with the neighbourhoods of Brockley to the east, Honor Oak to the south, East Dulwich to the south west, Peckham to the north west and New Cross to the north east.

== Politics ==
Most of Nunhead falls within the Peckham Westminster constituency. The current MP is Miatta Fahnbulleh of the Labour Co-op party.

The constituency forms part of the Lambeth and Southwark London Assembly constituency represented by Marina Ahmad of Labour.

Residents elect three councillors to Southwark Council every four years for the Nunhead and Queen's Road ward.

Nunhead
Party	Candidate	Votes	%	±%
Labour	Fiona Colley*	2,229		
Labour	Sunil Chopra*	1,936		
Labour	Sandra Rhule	1,820		
Green	Steve Barbe	714		
Green	Valerie Remy	555		
Green	Dave Tapsell	435		
All People's Party	Althea Smith*	323		
Conservative	Robert Clarke	298		
Conservative	Gerald Chan	255		
Conservative	Harry Chathli	237		
Liberal Democrats	Frances Blango	200		
Liberal Democrats	Paul Melly	189		
Liberal Democrats	Dolly Mace	163		
Turnout		3,336	34.3	
Labour hold		Swing		
Labour hold		Swing		
Labour hold		Swing		

Althea Smith was elected in 2010 for the Labour Party, but defected to the All People's Party.

== Culture ==
Nunhead Cemetery Open Day occurs every May and is organised by Friends of Nunhead Cemetery.

Nunhead Beats the Bounds is an annual event where Nunhead residents march around the perimeter of Nunhead - from Queens Road to Camberwell New Cemetery - to build community spirit. It is generally held the first Saturday afternoon in July.

Nunhead American Radio with Lewis Schaffer on Resonance 104.4FM is a radio programme for and about the residents of Nunhead, with special focus on the immigrant American community.

The Nunhead Art Trail is an art and craft showcase organised by volunteers. Nunhead artists and craftspeople exhibit their work in their flats, houses and gardens allowing the public to view and buy the work.

== Notable people ==
- Harold Bride - (born Nunhead, 1890) - Seaman
- Ademola Lookman - Footballer - Attended St Thomas the Apostle School
