= Nunhead and Queen's Road =

Electoral ward in London, England

- Electoral ward for the Southwark London Borough Council
- Borough: London Borough of Southwark
- County: Greater London
- Population: 15,860 (2021)
- Major settlements: Nunhead
- Area: 1.185 km²

Current electoral ward
- Created: 2018
- Number of members: 3
- Councillors: Catherine Dawkins; Claire Sheppard; Richard Taylor

Nunhead and Queen's Road is an electoral ward in the London Borough of Southwark. The ward was first used in the 2018 elections and elects three councillors to Southwark London Borough Council.

== History ==
In January 2026, Reginald Popoola defected to the Green Party of England and Wales.

== Geography ==
The ward is named after the areas of Nunhead and Queens Road.

== Councillors ==
Election	Councillors		
2022	Gavin Edwards (Labour Party)	Reginald Popoola (Labour Party)	Sandra Rhule (Labour Party)
2026	Catherine Dawkins (Green Party)	Claire Sheppard (Green Party)	Richard Taylor (Green Party)

== Elections ==
=== 2022 ===
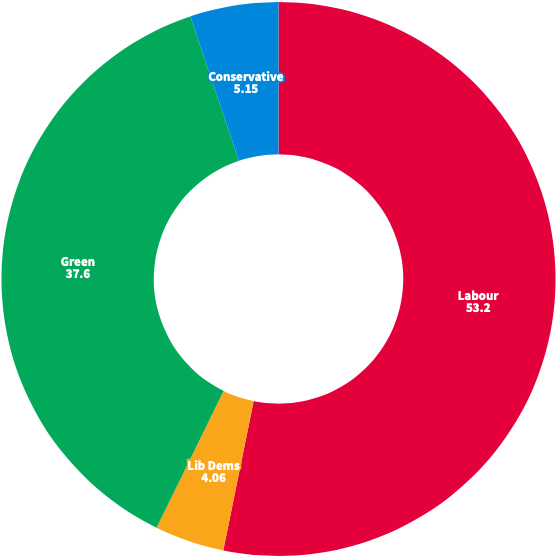

Nunhead & Queen's Road (3)
Party	Candidate	Votes	%	±%
Labour	Gavin Edwards*	2,072	52.5	−15.9
Labour	Reginald Popoola	2,040	51.7	−17.6
Labour	Sandra Rhule*	2,025	51.3	−15.4
Green	Claire Sheppard	1,551	39.3	+23.4
Green	Catherine Dawkins	1,516	38.3	+23.9
Green	Richard Taylor	1,270	32.2	+18.8
Conservative	Harry Chathli	216	5.5	−2.0
Liberal Democrats	Fergus Anderson	193	4.9	−1.6
Conservative	Domonic Garriques	191	4.8	−2.7
Conservative	Ian Twinn	188	4.7	−2.8
Liberal Democrats	Claire Mayne-Constantinou	142	3.6	−2.3
Liberal Democrats	Christopher Taras	134	3.4	−2.5
Turnout		3,949	34.10	+4.65
Labour hold		Swing		
Labour hold		Swing		
Labour hold		Swing		

=== 2018 ===
Nunhead & Queen's Road 2018 (3)
Party	Candidate	Votes	%	±%
Labour	Sunil Chopra*	2,305		
Labour	Gavin Edwards*	2,276		
Labour	Sandra Rhule*	2,221		
Green	Rosalie Schweiker	528		
Green	Steve Barbe	479		
Green	Bartley Shaw	445		
Conservative	Domonic Garriques	254		
Conservative	Andrew Smith	251		
Conservative	Harry Chathli	249		
Liberal Democrats	Sarah Mustoe	216		
Liberal Democrats	Rupert Morris	198		
Liberal Democrats	Gillian Shields	196		
Majority				
Turnout		3,328	29.5	
Labour win (new seat)				
Labour win (new seat)				
Labour win (new seat)				

== See also ==
- List of electoral wards in Greater London
