= Andy Love =

British Labour Co-op politician

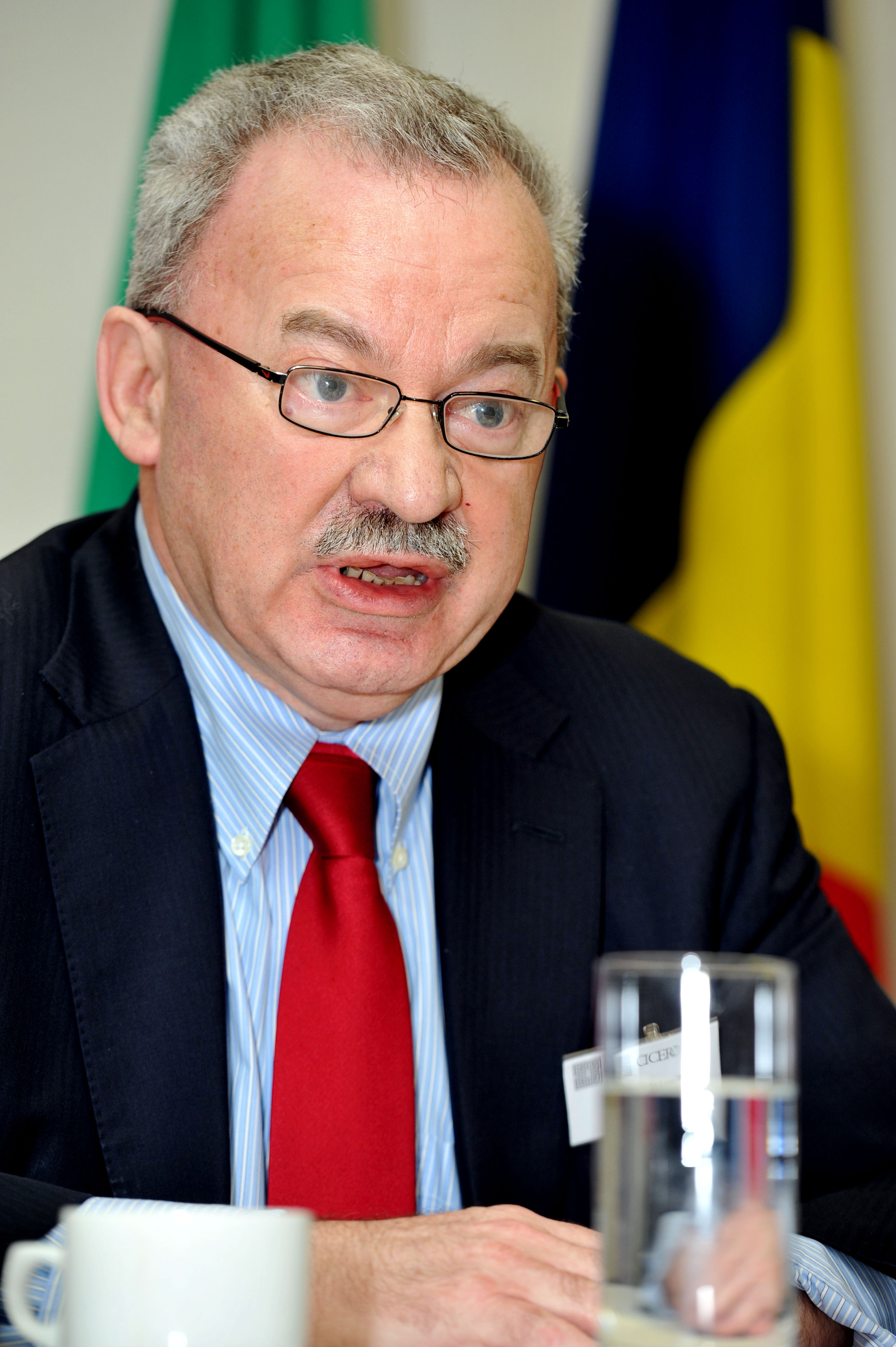

Member of Parliament for Edmonton
- In office 1 May 1997 – 30 March 2015
- Preceded by: Ian Twinn
- Succeeded by: Kate Osamor
- Majority: 9,613 (23.8%)

Personal details
- Born: 21 March 1949 (age 77)
- Party: Labour Co-operative
- Spouse: Ruth Rosenthal (m. 1983-present)
- Education: Strathclyde University
- Profession: Politician

Andy Love (born 21 March 1949) is a British Labour Co-operative politician who was Member of Parliament (MP) for Edmonton from 1997 to 2015.

== Early life ==
Andy Love was educated at Greenock High School on Inverkip Road before attending the University of Strathclyde in Glasgow, where he was awarded a BSc degree. He moved to London in 1974 and joined the Labour Party the following year. He studied for the Institute of Chartered Secretaries and Administrators qualification.

He was elected to the London Borough of Haringey Council in 1980 for two terms and chaired both the council's finance and housing committees. He also served as a member of the North East Thames Regional Health Authority. In 1985 he became the political secretary for Co-operative Retail Services (now part of The Co-operative Group), and in 1993 he became the parliamentary officer of the Cooperative Party.

== Parliamentary career ==
Love contested the Edmonton seat at the 1992 general election, losing by 593 votes to the incumbent Conservative MP Ian Twinn. In the Labour landslide at the 1997 general election, he unseated Twinn, with a majority of 13,472 votes, and Labour has retained the seat ever since.

In the House of Commons, he was involved in many backbench groups and campaigns; he served as the Parliamentary Private Secretary to Jacqui Smith when she was the minister at the Department of Health and Department of Trade and Industry between 2001 and 2005. He was a member of the Public Accounts Committee, and the Treasury Select Committee from 2005 until he left Parliament ten years later.

Love supported Peter Hain in the 2007 deputy leadership election. Since 1999, he has been a vice-patron of the Helen Rollason Cancer Appeal.

Love stood down at the 2015 general election, and was succeeded as MP for Edmonton by Kate Osamor of the Labour Party.

=== Voting record ===
How Andrew Love voted on key issues since 2000:

- Has never voted on a transparent Parliament.
- Voted for introducing a smoking ban.
- Voted for introducing ID cards.
- Voted for introducing foundation hospitals.
- Voted for introducing student top-up fees.
- Voted for Labour's anti-terrorism laws.
- Voted for the Iraq War.
- Voted against investigating the Iraq war.
- Voted for replacing Trident.
- Voted for the hunting ban.
- Voted for equal gay rights.

== Notes ==
Parliament of the United Kingdom
Preceded by Ian Twinn	Member of Parliament for Edmonton; 1997–2015	Succeeded by Kate Osamor
