= St George's (Southwark ward) =

Electoral ward in London, England

- Electoral ward for the Southwark London Borough Council
- Borough: London Borough of Southwark
- County: Greater London
- Population: 8,866 (2021)
- Area: 0.5775 km²

Current electoral ward
- Created: 2018
- Seats: 2

St George's is an electoral ward in the London Borough of Southwark. The ward was first used in the 2018 elections and elects two councillors to Southwark London Borough Council.

== Geography ==
The ward is named after the St George's area.

== Councillors ==
Election	Councillors	
2018	Maria Linforth-Hall (Liberal Democrats)	Graham Neale (Liberal Democrats)
2022	Maria Linforth-Hall (Liberal Democrats)	Graham Neale (Liberal Democrats)

== Elections ==
=== 2022 ===
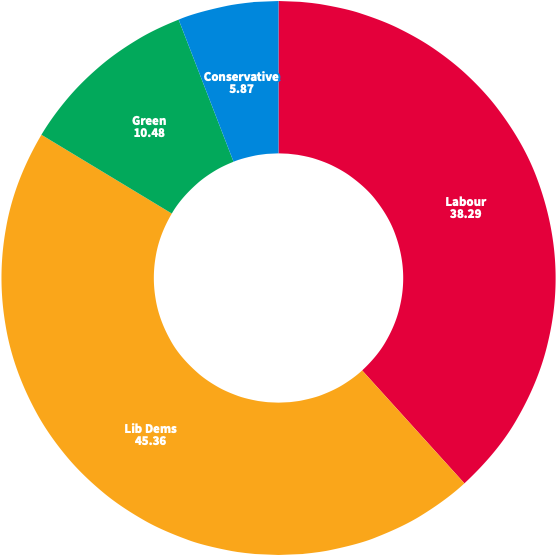

St George's (2)
Party	Candidate	Votes	%	±%
Liberal Democrats	Maria Linforth-Hall *	1,034	48.8	+2.9
Liberal Democrats	Graham Neale *	929	43.8	+0.2
Labour	Alex Marullo	836	39.4	−0.8
Labour	Samantha Vacciana	821	38.7	−1.2
Green	Mary Clegg	227	10.7	+1.9
Conservative	Alex Deane	140	6.6	−1.0
Conservative	Sasha Zaroubin	114	5.4	−1.7
Turnout		2,121	38.07	+0.29
Liberal Democrats hold		Swing		
Liberal Democrats hold		Swing		

=== 2018 ===
Following ward boundary changes, this ward was made up from the southern third of the former Cathedrals ward.

St George's (2)
Party	Candidate	Votes	%	±%
Liberal Democrats	Maria Linforth-Hall*	884	45.9	
Liberal Democrats	Graham Neale	839	43.6	
Labour	Ellie Cumbo	773	40.2	
Labour	Mark Griffiths	768	39.9	
Green	Ian Pocock	170	8.8	
Conservative	Siobhan Aarons	146	7.6	
Conservative	Kishan Chandarana	137	7.1	
Majority				
Turnout		1,925	37.78	
Liberal Democrats win (new seat)				
Liberal Democrats win (new seat)				

== See also ==
- List of electoral wards in Greater London
