= Ian Twinn =

British politician

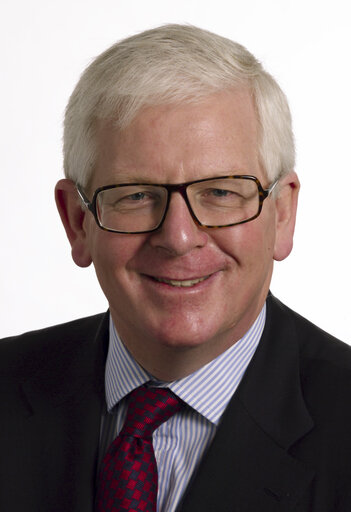
Twinn in 1999

Ian David Twinn CBE (born 26 April 1950) is a British Conservative politician. He was educated at Cambridge Grammar School for Boys (now Netherhall School), the University of Wales and Reading University; he then worked as a lecturer. Twinn was elected as MP for Edmonton, becoming the seat's first Conservative MP in 48 years, and serving from 1983 until he lost his seat to Labour's Andy Love in 1997. Twinn was also Deputy Chairman of the Conservative Party from 1986 to 1988. He also became the first Conservative in Edmonton to be re-elected for a second term (in 1987) and a third (in 1992). He was appointed a CBE in 2018 for political and voluntary service.

In 1999, he was placed fifth on the Conservative Party list for London in the European Parliament elections. The Conservatives secured only four seats, but Twinn served briefly as an MEP from 21 October 2003 until the 2004 elections, following the resignation of Lord Bethell due to ill health. Twinn was sixth on the Conservative list at the subsequent EU election, and lost his seat as the Conservatives won only three. He was listed eighth in 2009, and again was unsuccessful in being elected. He was a candidate for the Nunhead and Queen's Road ward in the 2022 Southwark London Borough Council election.

Parliament of the United Kingdom
Preceded by Ted Graham	Member of Parliament for Edmonton; 1983–1997	Succeeded by Andy Love
