= Neil Coyle =

British Labour politician

Neil Coyle MP
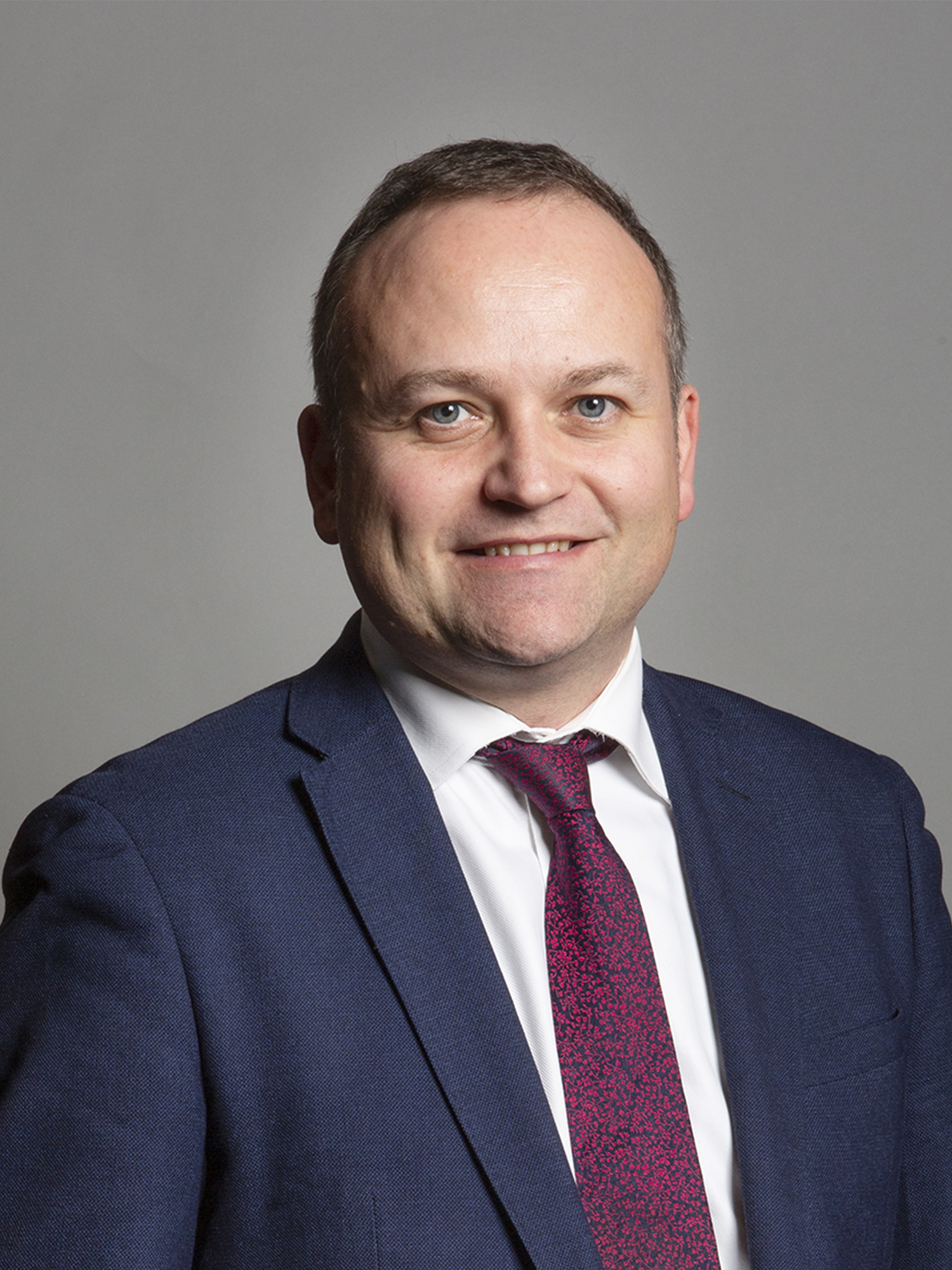
- Official portrait, 2019

Member of Parliament for Bermondsey and Old Southwark
- Incumbent
- Assumed office 7 May 2015
- Preceded by: Simon Hughes
- Majority: 7,787 (20.7%)

Member of Southwark London Borough Council for Newington
- In office 6 May 2010 – 22 March 2016
- Preceded by: James Gurling
- Succeeded by: James Coldwell

Personal details
- Born: Neil Alan John Coyle; 30 December 1978 (age 47) Luton, Bedfordshire, England
- Party: Labour
- Education: Bedford School; University of Hull (BA)
- Website: neilcoyle.laboursites.org

Neil Alan John Coyle (born 30 December 1978) is a British Labour politician who has served as the Member of Parliament (MP) for Bermondsey and Old Southwark since 2015.

Coyle has been the subject of a number of controversies including abusive social media posts, as well as complaints upheld by the Parliamentary Commissioner for Standards for "abusive language with a racial overtone" towards a journalist and abuse of a parliamentary assistant working for another Labour MP. He has spoken about his battle with alcoholism. In February 2022, Coyle was suspended by Labour and banned from Parliament's bars for six months. He had the whip reinstated in May 2023.

== Early life and career ==
Neil Coyle was born on 30 December 1978 in Luton. He grew up in Luton and is one of six children. He went to Wenlock and Ashcroft schools before receiving a full scholarship to Bedford School, an independent school for boys founded in 1552. He received a BA in British Politics and Legislative Studies from the University of Hull. From 2001 to 2003, he lived in China.

Coyle was elected as a councillor for Newington ward in the 2010 Southwark London Borough Council election. As a councillor, he supported the unsuccessful Garden Bridge project, on which his wife worked as a landscape architect, something about which he was open. He was deputy mayor of Southwark from 2014 to 2015. He stood down as a councillor in 2016.

== Parliamentary career ==
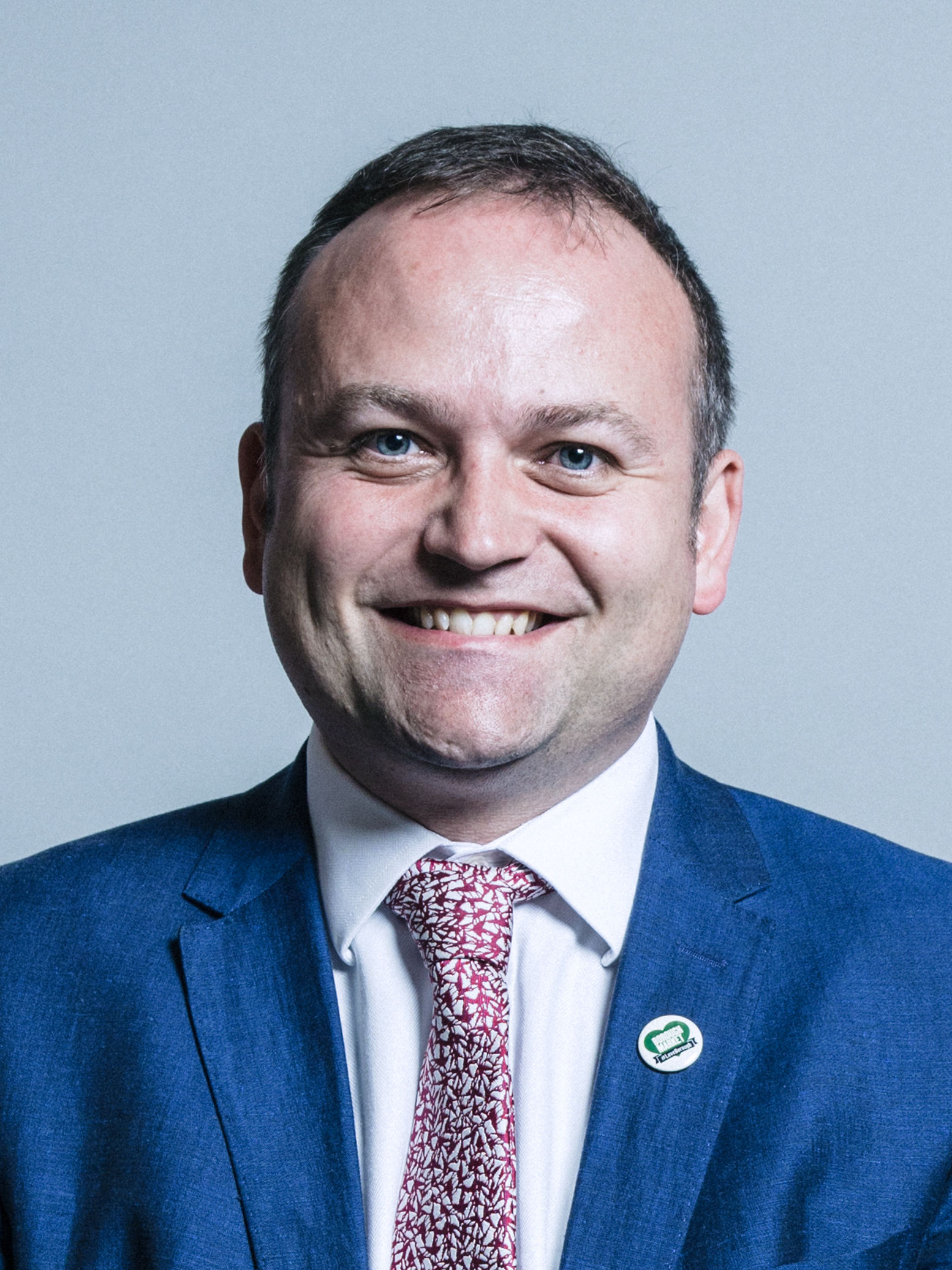
Official portrait, 2017

At the 2015 general election, Coyle was elected to Parliament as MP for Bermondsey and Old Southwark with 43.1% of the vote and a majority of 4,489. He was one of 36 Labour MPs to nominate Jeremy Corbyn as a candidate in the Labour leadership election of 2015. Following his election, he was appointed Parliamentary Private Secretary to the Shadow Leader of the House of Commons.

Following the May 2016 elections, he co-wrote an article with Jo Cox which said that they had "come to regret" the decision of voting to make Jeremy Corbyn leader of the opposition. After the article was published, Coyle resigned as a Parliamentary Private Secretary. He then supported Owen Smith in his unsuccessful attempt to replace Jeremy Corbyn in the 2016 leadership election. Coyle was highly critical of Corbyn and wrote a series of articles arguing against his position on several key issues, such as terrorism and Brexit.

In the 2016 referendum on the UK leaving the European Union (EU), Coyle campaigned to remain.

In February 2017, Coyle was one of 47 Labour MPs who defied the party's three-line whip to vote against triggering Article 50 for the UK to leave the EU and has called for it to be revoked. Coyle sits on the Work and Pensions Select Committee.

At the snap 2017 general election, Coyle was re-elected as MP for Bermondsey and Old Southwark with an increased vote share of 53.2% and an increased majority of 12,972.

He chairs the All-party parliamentary group (APPG) for Wines and Spirits, the secretariat for which is provided by the Wine and Spirit Trade Association, which is based in Coyle's constituency. He also chairs the APPG for Foodbanks, which he established in 2017, as well as those for Ending Homelessness and Counter Extremism.

In February 2019, Coyle said that he had declined an invitation to join The Independent Group, later Change UK, a splinter group of centrist Labour and Conservative MPs that formed that month.

Coyle was again re-elected at the 2019 general election with an increased vote share of 54.1% and an increased majority of 16,126.

In May 2021, Coyle reported Corbyn to the Parliamentary Commissioner for Standards, claiming that Corbyn had failed to declare full legal funding. The Commissioner did not uphold the complaint, noting there was no requirement to register legal support from a membership organisation.

On 11 February 2022, as a result of controversial statements by Coyle, the Labour whip was suspended from him and he was barred from all bars on the Westminster estate. Coyle also had his Labour Party membership administratively suspended, pending an investigation. In May 2023, he was readmitted to the Labour Party.

At the 2024 general election, Coyle was again re-elected, with a decreased vote share of 44.8% and a decreased majority of 7,787.

According to information obtained by Politico, new concerns regarding his behaviour toward staff emerged in 2024. Elected to a seat on the Work and Pensions Committee in October 2024 he departed a few weeks later. Coyle has rejected any suggestion that his departure from the committee is connected to the reported incident.

At the 2026 Labour Party leadership election, Coyle was the sole MP to nominate Catherine West. Andy Burnham, who had received the nomination of 369 out of 403 Labour members of parliament, including West, was ultimately elected unopposed as Labour leader.

== Controversial statements ==
=== Boris Johnson ===
Coyle has been criticised for his use of language in public on a number of occasions. In September 2019, Coyle referred to Prime Minister Boris Johnson on British television as "a dick". Following the incident, Coyle spoke with the Southwark News, saying his constituents had complained about his use of language, suggesting he does not "need to be that crude". Coyle told the Southwark News, "I will be toning down the language but never the passion".

=== Brexit and Piers Morgan ===
During the 2019 Labour Party Conference, Jeremy Corbyn made a Brexit statement that the Labour Party would not be immediately backing either leave or remain. Many Labour MPs voiced their concerns, but Coyle went a step further by describing Corbyn's stance as "bullshit".

Coyle again received media coverage after a day of strongly worded statements in the House of Commons. Labour MPs and their leader, Corbyn, were critical of Boris Johnson's use of language, including when Johnson suggested that the best way to honour Jo Cox was to deliver Brexit. Journalist and presenter Piers Morgan then tweeted about the use of Jo Cox's name, saying "Parliament has reached a new low on all sides. Disgraceful". Coyle replied on Twitter in several posts, telling Morgan to "go fuck yourself", while also calling him a "sick little man" and a "scrote".

=== Jacob Rees-Mogg ===
On 25 August 2020, in a now deleted tweet, Coyle wrote, "I have spent years warning local people that these fat old racists won't stop blaming the EU when their shit hits the fan. Here they come blaming others. Absolute shitbag racist wankers". This was in response to a tweet by fellow parliamentarian Jacob Rees-Mogg, who had criticised the BBC's decision to omit the traditional singing of "Rule, Britannia!" which ordinarily took place during the final evening of the Proms. Coyle followed this tweet up with a further tweet, referring to the song: "If you didn't hate it before, feel free to hate the song now. I've never known anyone but shitlickers like it tbh". Coyle later apologised for his tweets.

Later in 2020, Rees-Mogg accused UNICEF of a political stunt after it announced that for the first time in its 70-year history it would be providing food parcels to children in deprived areas of London prior to Christmas. Rees-Mogg said that UNICEF was "playing politics when it is meant to be looking after people in the poorest, the most deprived countries in the world, where people are starving, where there are famines and where there are civil wars". Rees-Mogg was branded a "Scrooge" by Coyle, who invited Rees-Mogg to visit Coyle's constituency, one of the affected areas.

=== Swearing ===
On 31 January 2022, Coyle was involved in a swearing fit at a Labour aide in a Westminster bar following a disagreement about the effects of Brexit and told a Conservative MP who intervened to calm the dispute to "fuck off and lose some weight".

=== Alleged racism ===
In early February 2022, Coyle was accused of making Sinophobic remarks on 1 February to Henry Dyer, a political reporter of British-Chinese origin. It was reported Coyle said to Dyer that he could tell "from how you look like you've been giving renminbi to Barry Gardiner", following the latter's receiving funds from an agent of the Chinese state. According to Dyer, while discussing Gardiner, Coyle also said he had been funded by "Fu Manchu". Consequently, on 11 February, Coyle had the Labour whip suspended pending an investigation and was banned from all bars on the Westminster estate.

Dyer said Coyle refused to apologise when he confronted him, with Coyle asking him, "if it was just the case that [Dyer] was being over-sensitive". After the incident was made public and reported to the Speaker of the House, Coyle apologised for his "insensitive comments" and said he would be cooperating with the investigation. Coyle faced calls to resign.

In March 2023, Coyle was found to have breached Parliament's bullying and harassment policy and was suspended from the Commons for five days. Coyle had the Labour whip suspended from February 2022 to May 2023. Coyle later claimed £295 in expenses for equality training. Labour MP Kim Johnson strongly criticised Coyle for charging taxpayers in his effort to make amends for his abusive behaviour. She raised the question of whether he was genuinely committed to learning from his mistakes.

=== Sexual harassment ===
In March 2023, it was revealed that Coyle had a sexual harassment complaint upheld against him as a Labour MP. Coyle made derogatory remarks about the partner of a young woman and asked her if she was "going back with me or him tonight then?"

== Personal life ==
Coyle married Sarah Lindars in 2014. His wife is a landscape architect and they have one daughter. Coyle has written about the impact on his family of his mother's mental ill-health. In July 2022, Coyle said he drank a lot because working as an MP was stressful. He said that he stopped drinking alcohol in March 2022.

Parliament of the United Kingdom
Preceded by Simon Hughes	Member of Parliament for Bermondsey and Old Southwark; 2015–present	Incumbent
