= South Bermondsey (ward) =

Electoral ward in London, England

- Electoral ward for the Southwark London Borough Council
- Borough: London Borough of Southwark
- County: Greater London
- Population: 15,954 (2021)
- Major settlements: South Bermondsey
- Area: 1.150 km²

Current electoral ward
- Created: 2002
- Seats: 3

South Bermondsey is an electoral ward in the London Borough of Southwark. The ward was first used in the 2002 elections and elects three councillors to Southwark London Borough Council.

== Geography ==
The ward is named after South Bermondsey.

== Councillors ==
Election	Councillors		
2022	Cassandra Brown (Labour Party)	Sunny Lambe (Labour Party)	Leo Pollak (Labour Party)

== Elections ==
=== 2022 ===
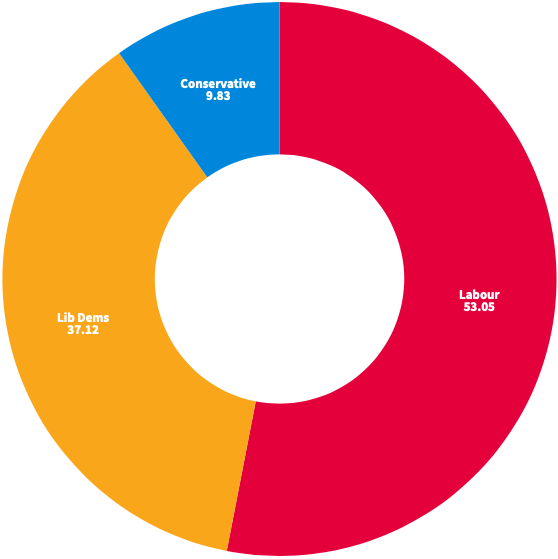

South Bermondsey (3)
Party	Candidate	Votes	%	±%
Labour	Cassandra Brown	2,025	54.0	+6.6
Labour	Sunny Lambe*	1,900	50.7	+2.4
Labour	Leo Pollak*	1,759	46.9	+0.9
Liberal Democrats	Alice Thomas	1,407	37.5	+1.7
Liberal Democrats	Michael Tipler	1,295	34.6	+0.5
Liberal Democrats	Patrickson Obanya	1,277	34.1	+3.5
Conservative	Lewis Jones	367	9.8	+2.7
Conservative	Jordan Abdi	359	9.6	+3.2
Conservative	Luke Warren	328	8.8	+2.5
Turnout		3,748	33.58	+1.13
Labour hold		Swing		
Labour hold		Swing		
Labour hold		Swing		

== See also ==
- List of electoral wards in Greater London
