= North Bermondsey =

Electoral ward in London, England

- Electoral ward for the Southwark London Borough Council
- Borough: London Borough of Southwark
- County: Greater London
- Population: 15,365 (2021)
- Major settlements: Bermondsey
- Area: 1.057 km²

Current electoral ward
- Created: 2018
- Seats: 3

North Bermondsey is an electoral ward in the London Borough of Southwark. The ward was first used in the 2018 elections and elects three councillors to Southwark London Borough Council.

== Geography ==
The ward is named after the district of North Bermondsey.

== Councillors ==
Election	Councillors		
2018	Hamish McCallum (Liberal Democrats)	Eliza Mann (Liberal Democrats)	Anood Al-Samerai (Liberal Democrats)
2022	Hamish McCallum (Liberal Democrats)	Rachel Bentley (Liberal Democrats)	Emily Tester (Liberal Democrats)

== Elections ==
=== 2022 ===
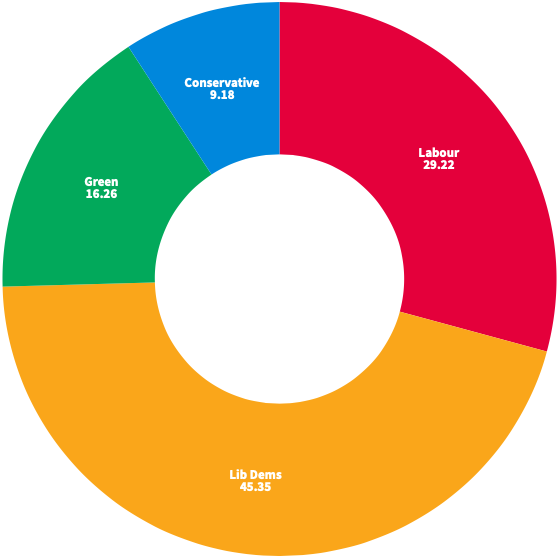

North Bermondsey (3)
Party	Candidate	Votes	%	±%
Liberal Democrats	Rachel Bentley	1,909	51.5	+2.2
Liberal Democrats	Hamish McCallum*	1,732	46.8	+3.0
Liberal Democrats	Emily Tester	1,724	46.5	+2.1
Labour	Kaied Ghiyatha	1,227	33.1	+0.4
Labour	Claudia Reid	1,194	32.2	+0.8
Labour	Sirajul Islam**	1,036	28.0	−1.7
Green	Nicola Hearn	641	17.3	+7.9
Conservative	Ian Leonard	415	11.2	−1.6
Conservative	Ravi Gidwani	370	10.0	−1.1
Conservative	Kono Kono-Ugen	301	8.1	−2.3
Turnout		3,705	32.85	+2.12
Liberal Democrats hold		Swing		
Liberal Democrats hold		Swing		
Liberal Democrats hold		Swing		

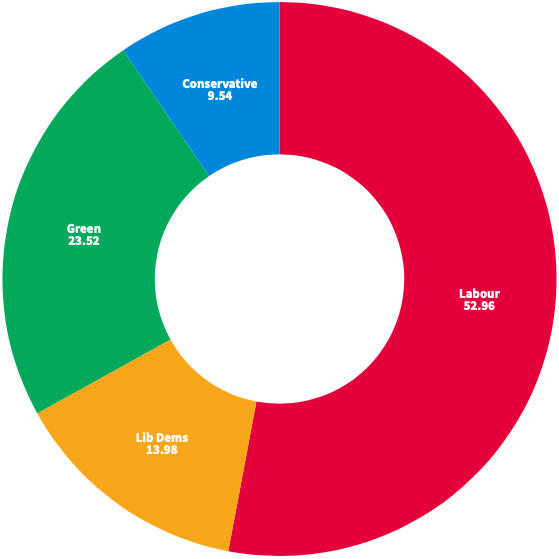

=== 2018 ===
Following boundary changes, this ward is mostly made up of the former ward of Riverside, but also includes an area previously in Rotherhithe ward.

North Bermondsey (3)
Party	Candidate	Votes	%	±%
Liberal Democrats	Anood Al-Samerai*	1,744	49.3	
Liberal Democrats	Eliza Mann*	1,570	44.4	
Liberal Democrats	Hamish McCallum*	1,550	43.8	
Labour	Leona Emmanuel	1,155	32.7	
Labour	Shahina Jaffer	1,109	31.4	
Labour	Jack Taylor	1,051	29.7	
Conservative	Andrew Baker	452	12.8	
Conservative	Luke Johnson	394	11.1	
Conservative	Dan Bridgett	368	10.4	
Green	Clare Cummings	331	9.4	
Green	Kevin Jones	229	6.5	
UKIP	Rosie Beattie	121	3.4	
TUSC	Gary Kandinsky	62	1.8	
Majority				
Turnout		3,537	30.73	
Liberal Democrats win (new seat)				
Liberal Democrats win (new seat)				
Liberal Democrats win (new seat)				

== See also ==
- List of electoral wards in Greater London
