= Chaucer (Southwark ward) =

Electoral ward in South London, England

- Electoral ward for the Southwark London Borough Council
- Chaucer ward boundaries since 2018
- Borough: Southwark
- County: Greater London
- Population: 14,732 (2021)
- Electorate: 9,986 (2022)
- Area: 0.7338 square kilometres (0.2833 sq mi)

Current electoral ward
- Created: 1965
- Number of members: 3
- Councillors: Felix Hamer; Suzanne Wise; Pascale Mitchell
- GSS code: E05011098 (2018–present)

Chaucer is an electoral ward in the London Borough of Southwark. The ward has existed since the creation of the borough on 1 April 1965 and was first used in the 1964 elections.

== Councillors ==
Election	Councillors		
2018	Helen Dennis (Labour Party)	Karl Eastham (Labour Party)	Sirajul Islam (Labour Party)
2022	Helen Dennis (Labour Party)	Laura Johnson (Labour Party)	Joseph Vambe (Labour Party)
2026	Felix Hamer (Green Party)	Suzanne Wise (Green Party)	Pascale Mitchell (Green Party)

== Southwark council elections since 2018 ==
There was a revision of ward boundaries in Southwark in 2018.

=== 2026 election ===
The election took place on 7 May 2022.

2026 Southwark London Borough Council election: Chaucer (3)
Party	Candidate	Votes	%	±%
Green	Felix Hamer	1,465	37.2	+15.0
Green	Suzanne Wise	1,427	36.2	N/A
Green	Pascale Mitchell	1,385	35.1	N/A
Labour	Joseph Vambe	1,238	31.4	−19.9
Labour	Robert Smeath	1,194	30.3	−36.6
Labour	Saidat Oketunde	1,187	30.1	−31.4
Liberal Democrats	Anna Bayraktar	855	21.7	+0.4
Liberal Democrats	Monsur Ahmed	806	20.5	+1.7
Liberal Democrats	Arif Hussain	698	17.7	+3.6
Conservative	Andrew Dowsett	299	7.6	−2.2
Reform	David Pavitt	266	6.7	N/A
Conservative	Ralph Tiffin	246	6.2	−2.8
Conservative	Emmanuel Ngwengi	199	5.0	−3.8
Independent	Anisa Jama	46	1.2	N/A
Rejected ballots		8		
Turnout		3,941	37.94	+9.25
Registered electors		10,394		
Green gain from Labour		Swing		
Green gain from Labour		Swing		
Green gain from Labour		Swing		

=== 2022 election ===
The election took place on 5 May 2022.

2022 Southwark London Borough Council election: Chaucer
Party	Candidate	Votes	%	±%
Labour	Helen Dennis	1,916	66.9	▲9.2
Labour	Laura Johnson	1,761	61.5	▲9.4
Labour	Joseph Vambe	1,470	51.3	▲2.0
Green	Robert Hutchinson	637	22.2	▲10.9
Liberal Democrats	Poddy Clark	609	21.3	▼4.4
Liberal Democrats	Monsur Ahmed	539	18.8	▼2.5
Liberal Democrats	Mackie Sheik	403	14.1	▼6.7
Conservative	Andrew Dowsett	280	9.8	▼1.2
Conservative	Richard Packer	257	9.0	▼1.5
Conservative	Tom Packer	251	8.8	▼1.2
Turnout		2,865	28.69	−0.04
Labour hold		Swing		
Labour hold		Swing		
Labour hold		Swing		

=== 2018 election ===
The election took place on 3 May 2018.

2018 Southwark London Borough Council election: Chaucer
Party	Candidate	Votes	%	±%
Labour Co-op	Helen Dennis	1,713	57.7	
Labour Co-op	Karl Eastham	1,547	52.1	
Labour Co-op	Sirajul Islam	1,463	49.3	
Liberal Democrats	Poddy Clark	764	25.7	
Liberal Democrats	Michael Zreika	633	21.3	
Liberal Democrats	Mackie Sheik	616	20.8	
Green	Winnie Baffoe	336	11.3	
Green	Phil Vabulas	331	11.2	
Conservative	Edward Anyaeji	327	11.0	
Conservative	Laura Collins	313	10.5	
Conservative	George Smith	298	10.0	
Green	Rebecca Warren	213	7.2	
Majority				
Turnout		2,967	28.73	
Labour Co-op win (new boundaries)				
Labour Co-op win (new boundaries)				
Labour Co-op win (new boundaries)				

== 2002–2018 Southwark council elections ==
Chaucer ward boundaries from 2002 to 2018

There was a revision of ward boundaries in Southwark in 2002.

== 1978–2002 Southwark council elections ==
There was a revision of ward boundaries in Southwark in 1978.

== 1968–1978 Southwark council elections ==
There was a revision of ward boundaries in Southwark in 1968.

== 1964–1968 Southwark council elections ==
=== 1964 election ===
The election took place on 7 May 1964.

1964 Southwark London Borough Council election: Chaucer
Party	Candidate	Votes	%	±%
Labour	A. Knight	1,104	77.6	
Labour	E. Button	1,073	75.4	
Labour	N.H. Tertis	1,063	74.7	
Conservative	D.E. Geddes	266	18.7	
Conservative	D.M. Lang	241	16.9	
Conservative	J. Gordon	240	16.9	
Communist	T. Fuller	122	8.6	
Turnout		1,423	16.3	
Labour win (new seat)				
Labour win (new seat)				
Labour win (new seat)				
