= Alex Deane =

English writer, political commentator and consultant

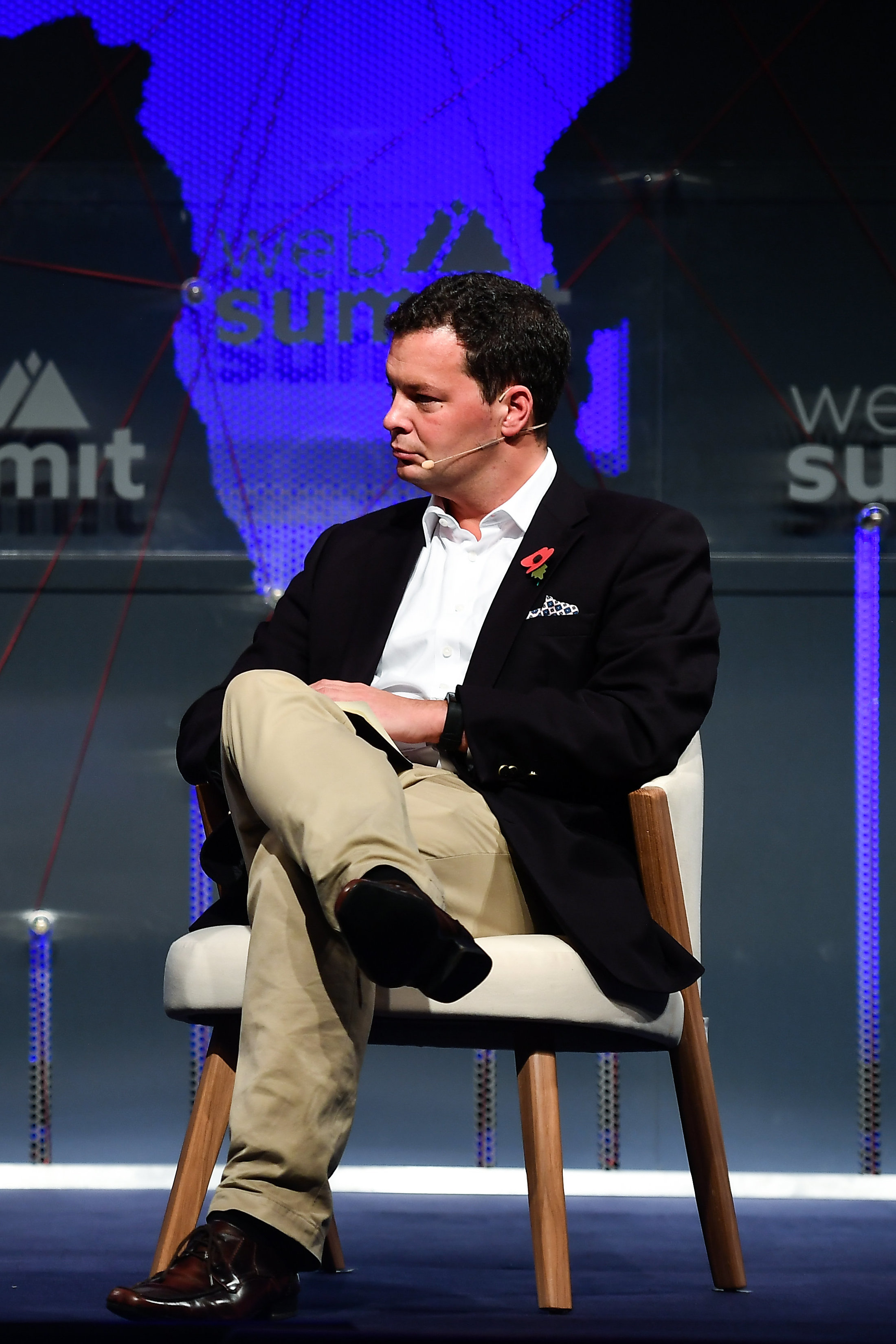
Alex Deane in 2019

Alexander John Cameron Deane (born 24 June 1979) is a British writer, political commentator and consultant. He is a regular commentator on Sky News and GB News, and formerly on BBC Dateline London.

== Education ==
The son of Paul Deane and Jacqueline née Osborne, he was educated at County Upper School, a state comprehensive school in Bury St Edmunds, Suffolk, before going to Trinity College, Cambridge, where he read English Literature, graduating in 2000. He then studied at Griffith University in Australia, as a Rotary Scholar and graduated with an MA in international relations in 2002.

During his time training to be a barrister at Middle Temple he won the 2004 World Universities Debating Championship.

== Career ==
Deane was called to the bar at Middle Temple in 2005. He served as Chief of Staff to David Cameron and Tim Collins during their respective periods as Shadow Secretary of State for Education. He served as the founding director of Big Brother Watch from 2009 to 2011.

In 2011 Deane was elected as Commoner (the City equivalent of a Councillor) to the Court of Common Council for the ward of Farringdon Without and was reelected at the 2013 City of London Corporation election, serving until the 2017 City of London Corporation election. A liveryman of the Curriers' Company, he is a current member of The Freedom Association's management committee. In the 2018 Southwark London Borough Council election, he was a candidate in North Walworth ward.

His main role is Senior Managing Director, Head of UK Public Affairs for FTI Consulting having joined the company in 2014. He often appears in the media as a political commentator, is a Sky News regular and a BBC Dateline London panelist.

He was the executive director of the eurosceptic Grassroots Out campaign

Commentating on allegations that Boris Johnson groped Charlotte Edwardes, Deane quoted Alan Clark who said: "How do I know my advances are unwanted until I've made them?".

In 2018, he was shortlisted to be prospective Parliamentary candidate for the Ipswich seat, but lost to Tom Hunt.

Deane was the defeated Conservative parliamentary candidate for Finchley and Golders Green in the 2024 general election.

== Books ==
Deane is the author of Lessons From History, and More Lessons from History Uncovering the colourful characters of the past.
