= Columba Blango (politician) =

Sierra Leonean athlete

Personal information
- Nationality: Sierra Leonean
- Born: 23 April 1956 (age 70)

Sport
- Sport: Athletics
- Event: Decathlon

Columba Blango (born 23 April 1956) is a Sierra Leonean–British politician and former athlete. He competed in the men's decathlon at the 1980 Summer Olympics.

He later moved to the United Kingdom and served as a Liberal Democrat councillor and Mayor of Southwark. He became the Liberal Democrat parliamentary candidate for Camberwell and Peckham, standing at the 2010 United Kingdom general election. He was able to achieve a 1.9% increase in votes from the previous year, ultimately winning 22.4% of the vote, but was defeated by Harriet Harman of the Labour Party. He now works as a secondary school teacher. His son of the same name won a bronze medal at the 2020 Summer Paralympics.
