= 2026 Southwark London Borough Council election =

2026 English local government election

- 7 May 2026

All 63 seats to Southwark London Borough Council 32 seats needed for a majority
- Turnout: 40.38%
	First party	Second party	Third party
Leader	Sarah King	Sam Foster (Note: James McAsh was selected as leader of the Green group following the election)	Victor Chamberlain
Party	Labour	Green	Liberal Democrats
Last election	52 seats, 52.6%	0 seats, 16.5%	11 seats, 19.3%
Seats before	46	3	11
Seats after	29	22	12
Seat change	▼23	▲22	▲1
Popular vote	31,834	30,992	14,533
Percentage	34.35%	33.44%	15.68%
Swing	▼18.29	▲16.97	▼3.85
- Map of the results of the 2026 Southwark London Borough Council election. Labour in red, Liberal Democrats in orange and Greens in green.
Leader before election
Sarah King
Labour
Leader after election
James McAsh
Green

The 2026 Southwark London Borough Council election took place on 7 May 2026, as part of the 2026 United Kingdom local elections. All 63 members of Southwark London Borough Council were elected. The election took place alongside local elections in the other London boroughs.

Prior to the election, the council was under Labour majority control. The election saw the council go under no overall control. Labour remained the largest party, but the Green Party and Liberal Democrats subsequently formed a Joint Administration. Green councillor James McAsh (who had been a Labour councillor until defecting to the Greens in January 2026) was subsequently appointed as the new leader of the council at the subsequent annual council meeting on 28 May 2026.

== Background ==
=== History ===
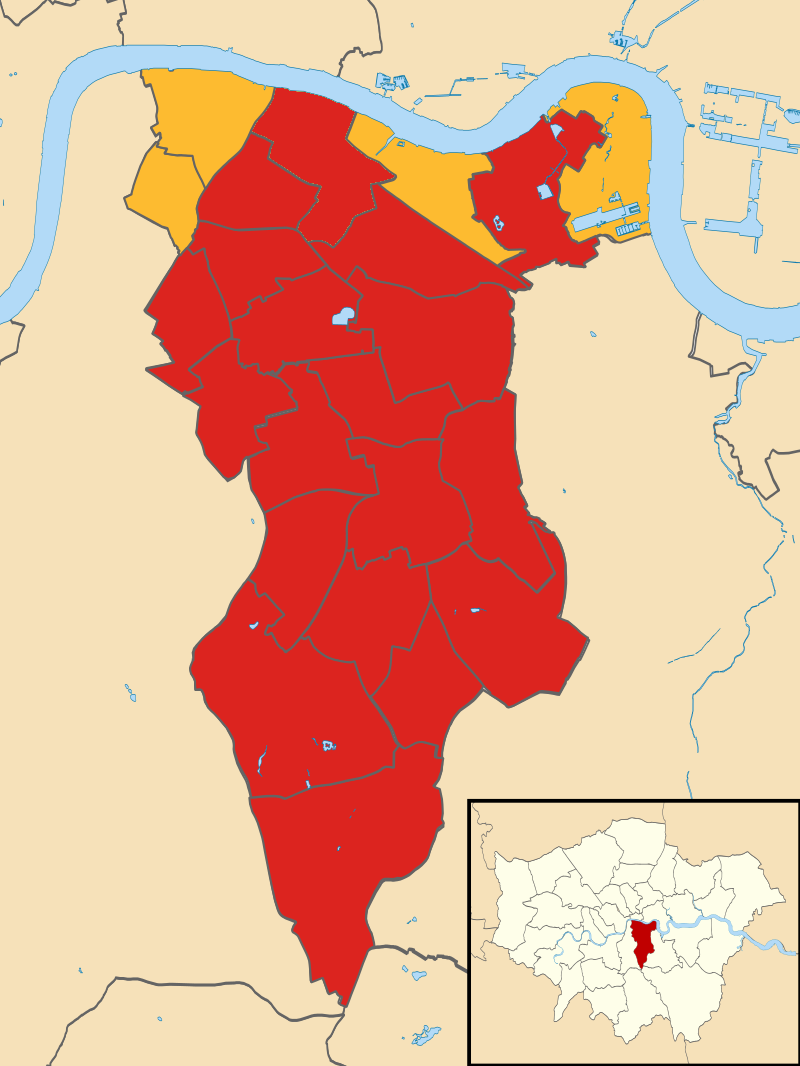
Map of the results of the 2022 Southwark council election. Labour in red and Liberal Democrats in yellow.

The thirty-two London boroughs were established in 1965 by the London Government Act 1963. They are the principal authorities in Greater London and have responsibilities including education, housing, planning, highways, social services, libraries, recreation, waste, environmental health and revenue collection. Some powers are shared with the Greater London Authority, which also manages passenger transport, police, and fire.

Since its formation, Southwark has been continuously under Labour control, apart from a period of no overall control from 2002 to 2010. All councillors have been from the Labour Party, Liberal Democrats, the Conservative Party, the Green Party, or independents. Labour regained its majority in the 2010 election, winning 35 seats with the Liberal Democrats on 25 and the Conservatives on three. Labour extended its majority by winning 48 seats in the 2014 election with the Liberal Democrats on 13 seats and the Conservatives on two. The Conservatives lost all their representation in the 2018 election, with Labour winning 49 seats with 53.09% of the vote across the borough and the Liberal Democrats winning the remaining 14 seats with 21.36% of the vote. The incumbent council leader, Peter John, was reappointed following the election. In the most recent election in 2022, Labour extended their lead, with Labour winning 52 seats and the Lib Dems winning 11.

=== Council term ===
In late 2025 and early 2026, six Labour councillors left the party or were suspended: on 12 July 2025, Cllr Kath Whittam resigned from the party in opposition to Cllr Sarah King being elected as Leader of Southwark Council and the Southwark Labour Group, following a disputed second ballot, with Cllr Laura Johnson leaving for the same reason on 7 August 2025. On 4 September 2025, Cllr Ketzia Harper and Cllr Sam Foster were suspended from the Labour Group for voting against the party whip in opposition to Cllr Sarah King becoming Leader of Southwark Council and Southwark Labour Group. In November 2025, Labour Cllr Darren Merrill left the party over the government's "rightward shift", and in January 2026 Cllr Reginald Popoola left the Labour Party for the same reason.

Foster, Whittam, and Popoola joined the Green Party of England and Wales to form a Green group on the council; the other three former Labour councillors continued to sit as independents. They were later joined by James McAsh.

== Electoral process ==
Southwark, as is the case all other London borough councils, elects all of its councillors at once every four years, with the previous election having taken place in 2022. The election takes place by multi-member first-past-the-post voting, with each ward being represented by two or three councillors. Electors will have as many votes as there are councillors to be elected in their ward, with the top two or three being elected.

All registered electors (British, Irish, Commonwealth and European Union citizens) living in London aged 18 or over are entitled to vote in the election. People who live at two addresses in different councils, such as university students with different term-time and holiday addresses, are entitled to be registered for and vote in elections in both local authorities. Voting in-person at polling stations takes place from 7:00 to 22:00 on election day, and voters are able to apply for postal votes or proxy votes in advance of the election.

== Council composition ==
After 2022 election		Before 2026 election	
Party	Seats	Party	Seats
Labour	52	Labour	45
Liberal Democrats	11	Liberal Democrats	11
		Green	4
		Independent	3

== Result summary ==
Council composition after the 2022 election

Council composition after the 2026 election

2026 Southwark London Borough Council election
Party	Seats	Gains	Losses	Net gain/loss	Seats %	Votes %	Votes	+/−
Labour	29	0	23	▼23	46.0%	34.35%	31,834	▼18.29
Green	22	22	0	▲22	34.9%	33.44%	30,992	▲16.97
Liberal Democrats	12	1	0	▲1	19.0%	15.68%	14,533	▼3.85
Reform	0	0	0	Steady	0.0%	8.58%	7,955	▲8.35
Conservative	0	0	0	Steady	0.0%	6.72%	6,229	▼3.02
Independent	0	0	0	Steady	0.0%	0.56%	517	▲0.46
Southwark Independent Socialists	0	0	0	Steady	0.0%	0.43%	394	New
Build Party	0	0	0	Steady	0.0%	0.16%	149	New
Communist League	0	0	0	Steady	0.0%	0.09%	81	New
Total	63						92,684	

Council composition following the election in May 2026:

↓
29	22	12
Labour	Green	Lib Dems

After the election left the council under no overall control, James McAsh was selected as the new leader of the Green group, and became the new council leader on 28 May in a Joint Administration agreement with the Liberal Democrats.

== Results by ward ==
=== Borough and Bankside ===
Borough & Bankside (3)
Party	Candidate	Votes	%	±%
Liberal Democrats	Victor Chamberlain	927	40.1	−16.0
Liberal Democrats	Hellen Benavides	864	37.4	−16.5
Liberal Democrats	David Watson	804	34.8	−16.8
Green	Samuel Aurelius	573	24.8	N/A
Green	Sam Hills	549	23.8	N/A
Green	Alastair Ritchie	531	23.0	N/A
Labour	Jack Green	512	22.2	−10.7
Labour	Ruth Wilson	496	21.5	−10.2
Labour	Hadi Sharifi	434	18.8	−12.9
Reform	Simon Vardigans	278	12.0	N/A
Conservative	Graham Davison	194	8.4	−1.7
Conservative	Richard Packer	193	8.4	−2.2
Conservative	Barry Joseph	189	8.2	−0.7
Rejected ballots		4		
Turnout		2,309	34.37	−0.13
Registered electors		6,719		
Liberal Democrats hold		Swing		
Liberal Democrats hold		Swing		
Liberal Democrats hold		Swing		

=== Camberwell Green ===
Camberwell Green (3)
Party	Candidate	Votes	%	±%
Labour	Dora Dixon-Fyle	2,038	47.6	−21.5
Labour	Jen Thornton	1,785	41.7	−27.5
Labour	James Moyse	1,764	41.2	−22.1
Green	Joe Campbell	1,609	37.6	+13.4
Green	Lola Garratt	1,592	37.2	N/A
Green	Freddy Kinsella	1,440	33.6	N/A
Liberal Democrats	Sarah Anderson	417	9.7	−1.0
Reform	Rakesh Shah	303	7.1	N/A
Liberal Democrats	Ismael Rodriguez	291	6.8	−3.9
Conservative	Robert Hayward	267	6.2	−1.5
Liberal Democrats	Gavin Terry	249	5.8	−0.3
Conservative	Rupert Watson	238	5.6	−2.7
Conservative	Theodore Aririahusim	191	4.5	−2.1
Rejected ballots		17		
Turnout		4,282	36.46	+6.25
Registered electors		11,745		
Labour hold		Swing		
Labour hold		Swing		
Labour hold		Swing		

=== Champion Hill ===
Champion Hill (2)
Party	Candidate	Votes	%	±%
Labour	Sarah King	1,609	51.7	−14.0
Labour	Bill Williams	1,181	37.9	−27.0
Green	Michael Millar	1,172	37.6	+16.0
Green	Cato Sandford	1,140	36.6	N/A
Liberal Democrats	Irina Von Wiese*	240	7.7	−4.8
Conservative	Michael Barge	185	5.9	−2.2
Liberal Democrats	Max Shillam	179	5.7	−6.1
Reform	Folake Oladeinde	167	5.4	N/A
Conservative	Christine Langhoff	157	5.0	−2.5
Rejected ballots		13		
Turnout		3,114	44.07	+7.38
Registered electors		7,069		
Labour hold		Swing		
Labour hold		Swing		

Irina von Wiese was previously elected for the Borough and Bankside ward.

=== Chaucer ===
Chaucer (3)
Party	Candidate	Votes	%	±%
Green	Felix Hamer	1,465	37.2	+15.0
Green	Suzanne Wise	1,427	36.2	N/A
Green	Pascale Mitchell	1,385	35.1	N/A
Labour	Joseph Vambe	1,238	31.4	−19.9
Labour	Robert Smeath	1,194	30.3	−36.6
Labour	Saidat Oketunde	1,187	30.1	−31.4
Liberal Democrats	Anna Bayraktar	855	21.7	+0.4
Liberal Democrats	Monsur Ahmed	806	20.5	+1.7
Liberal Democrats	Arif Hussain	698	17.7	+3.6
Conservative	Andrew Dowsett	299	7.6	−2.2
Reform	David Pavitt	266	6.7	N/A
Conservative	Ralph Tiffin	246	6.2	−2.8
Conservative	Emmanuel Ngwengi	199	5.0	−3.8
Independent	Anisa Jama	46	1.2	N/A
Rejected ballots		8		
Turnout		3,941	37.94	+9.25
Registered electors		10,394		
Green gain from Labour		Swing		
Green gain from Labour		Swing		
Green gain from Labour		Swing		

=== Dulwich Hill ===
Dulwich Hill (2)
Party	Candidate	Votes	%	±%
Labour	Tori Griffiths	1,442	41.6	−26.4
Green	Janice White	1,306	37.7	+12.0
Green	Simon Heap	1,253	36.2	N/A
Labour	William Houngbo	1,243	35.9	−11.9
Liberal Democrats	Catherine Powell	356	10.3	−7.7
Liberal Democrats	Michael Bukola	325	9.4	−3.2
Conservative	David Bradbury	263	7.6	−3.1
Conservative	Jane Lyons	246	7.1	−3.1
Reform	Stephen Smith	220	6.3	N/A
Rejected ballots		19		
Turnout		3,466	47.76	+8.79
Registered electors		7,262		
Labour hold		Swing		
Green gain from Labour		Swing		

=== Dulwich Village ===
Dulwich Village (2)
Party	Candidate	Votes	%	±%
Labour	Margy Newens	1,874	38.6	−6.8
Labour	Richard Leeming	1,629	33.5	−7.9
Liberal Democrats	Ed Hill-Smith	1,316	27.1	+4.8
Liberal Democrats	Richard Wingfield	1,290	26.6	+2.2
Conservative	Tristan Honeyborne	911	18.8	−4.1
Conservative	Clive Rates	800	16.5	−6.2
Green	Philip Collins	796	16.4	+8.1
Green	Vincent Matley	666	13.7	+5.7
Reform	Robert Hope	216	4.4	+3.3
Rejected ballots		11		
Turnout		4,858	61.54	+0.88
Registered electors		7,899		
Labour hold		Swing		
Labour hold		Swing		

=== Dulwich Wood ===
Dulwich Wood (2)
Party	Candidate	Votes	%	±%
Labour	Ruth Bannister	1,496	43.1	−15.0
Labour	Sean Hannigan	1,274	36.7	−16.1
Green	Anna Crowley	1,065	30.7	+16.1
Green	Ralph Smyth	816	23.5	+3.6
Conservative	Lewis Jones	523	15.1	−7.9
Conservative	Guy Matthews	506	14.6	−7.4
Liberal Democrats	Andrew MacKay	306	8.8	−1.0
Reform	James Lucas	290	8.4	N/A
Liberal Democrats	Aiken Furlong	289	8.3	−1.4
Reform	John Whiteford	267	7.7	N/A
Rejected ballots		10		
Turnout		3,471	46.17	+3.77
Registered electors		7,528		
Labour hold		Swing		
Labour hold		Swing		

=== Faraday ===
Faraday (3)
Party	Candidate	Votes	%	±%
Labour	Mohamed Deen	1,297	43.5	−19.9
Labour	Felicia Johnston	1,296	43.5	−18.9
Labour	Sasjkia Otto	1,171	39.3	−22.9
Green	David Battersby	1,017	34.1	+17.3
Green	Suzy Gillett	1,009	33.9	+18.0
Green	Giancarlo Elizondo	936	31.4	N/A
Reform	Robert Killick	314	10.5	N/A
Reform	Edward O'Connor	303	10.2	N/A
Conservative	Sophie Beeley	221	7.4	−3.4
Conservative	Edward Davis	206	6.9	−2.8
Liberal Democrats	Rebecca Kadritzke	203	6.8	−2.5
Liberal Democrats	Khadija Gebo	186	6.2	−2.3
Liberal Democrats	Paul Wendt	171	5.7	−2.4
Conservative	Doran Doeh	130	4.4	−3.1
Rejected ballots		11		
Turnout		2,980	35.65	+5.78
Registered electors		8,370		
Labour hold		Swing		
Labour hold		Swing		
Labour hold		Swing		

=== Goose Green ===
Goose Green (3)
Party	Candidate	Votes	%	±%
Green	Eloise Waldon-Day	2,168	40.2	+17.9
Green	James McAsh	2,108	39.0	−16.5
Green	George Grime	1,984	36.7	+21.5
Liberal Democrats	James Barber	1,729	32.0	+9.2
Labour	Portia Mwangangye	1,447	26.8	−32.8
Liberal Democrats	Kaz Doyle	1,383	25.6	+8.0
Labour	Liam McGrath	1,343	24.9	−30.6
Liberal Democrats	Luke McSorley	1,327	24.6	+8.3
Labour	Charlie Smith	1,271	23.5	−26.9
Reform	Damian Cluskey	232	4.3	N/A
Reform	Marcus Walford	223	4.1	N/A
Conservative	Domonic Garriques	204	3.8	−3.6
Reform	Simon West	201	3.7	N/A
Conservative	Simon Johnson	185	3.4	−3.6
Conservative	Kole Gjikolaj	168	3.1	−3.5
Rejected ballots		11		
Turnout		5,399	50.81	+10.95
Registered electors		10,632		
Green gain from Labour		Swing		
Green gain from Labour		Swing		
Green gain from Labour		Swing		

=== London Bridge & West Bermondsey ===
London Bridge & West Bermondsey (3)
Party	Candidate	Votes	%	±%
Labour	Sam Dalton	1,431	35.2	−8.8
Liberal Democrats	David Noakes	1,367	33.7	−0.2
Labour	Selena Gray	1,361	33.5	−14.8
Green	Emily Ward	1,237	30.5	+16.6
Liberal Democrats	Sonay Ozkutayli	1,162	28.6	−5.0
Labour	Rugie Kanu	1,110	27.3	−17.4
Green	Jonathan Woolhouse	1,024	25.2	+15.5
Liberal Democrats	Uthman Ukueku	991	24.4	−7.1
Reform	Stephen Fitzgerald	435	10.7	N/A
Conservative	William Amor	306	7.5	+0.1
Conservative	Siobhan Aarons	305	7.5	+0.2
Conservative	Andrew Neville	272	6.7	±0.0
Rejected ballots		16		
Turnout		4,061	36.50	+2.97
Registered electors		11,141		
Labour hold		Swing		
Liberal Democrats gain from Labour		Swing		
Labour hold		Swing		

=== Newington ===
Newington (3)
Party	Candidate	Votes	%	±%
Labour	John Batteson	1,809	45.6	−14.8
Labour	Natasha Ennin	1,760	44.4	−17.7
Labour	Leigh Richman	1,478	37.3	−26.1
Green	Nicola Hearn	1,378	34.8	+19.5
Green	Kevin Chuah	1,332	33.6	+19.6
Green	Joel Resare	1,169	29.5	+18.0
Reform	Michael Hession	389	9.8	N/A
Reform	Daniel Thompson	372	9.4	N/A
Liberal Democrats	Ryan Kingsbury	370	9.3	−3.3
Reform	Dominic Reader	368	9.3	N/A
Liberal Democrats	Paola Uribe	278	7.0	−4.4
Liberal Democrats	Dhiren Ponnambalam	254	6.4	−4.4
Conservative	Thomas Packer	211	5.3	−4.3
Conservative	Maria Gkaripi	194	4.9	−4.3
Conservative	Peter Reid	181	4.6	−2.6
Independent	Anastasios Maragiannis	47	1.2	N/A
Rejected ballots		15		
Turnout		3,965	37.25	+5.63
Registered electors		10,643		
Labour hold		Swing		
Labour hold		Swing		
Labour hold		Swing		

=== North Bermondsey ===
North Bermondsey (3)
Party	Candidate	Votes	%	±%
Liberal Democrats	Rachel Bentley	1,786	41.2	−10.3
Liberal Democrats	Francesco Guerrieri	1,360	31.3	−15.5
Liberal Democrats	Patrickson Obanya	1,179	27.2	−19.3
Green	Susi Arnott	1,063	24.5	+7.2
Labour	Carys Allsopp	944	21.8	−11.3
Green	Amer Alic	922	21.2	N/A
Green	Seb Newsam	892	20.6	N/A
Labour	Andy Bruce	883	20.4	−11.8
Labour	Robin Pollard	787	18.1	−9.9
Reform	Jonathan Frost	695	16.0	N/A
Conservative	Sophie Ainsworth	556	12.8	+1.6
Conservative	Robert Ferguson	425	9.8	−0.2
Conservative	Theodore Seely	361	8.3	+0.2
Rejected ballots		16		
Turnout		4,339	37.24	+4.39
Registered electors		11,650		
Liberal Democrats hold		Swing		
Liberal Democrats hold		Swing		
Liberal Democrats hold		Swing		

=== North Walworth ===
North Walworth (3)
Party	Candidate	Votes	%	±%
Green	Rebecca Corn	1,697	41.0	+20.3
Green	Sam Foster	1,585	38.2	+24.7
Green	Vanessa Threadgold	1,524	36.8	+23.7
Labour	Saba Manzoor	1,450	35.0	−25.5
Labour	Philip Wheeler	1,404	33.9	−22.3
Labour	Zaid Moosa	1,282	30.9	−22.2
Liberal Democrats	lon Martea	484	11.7	−2.7
Liberal Democrats	Frank Potaczek	471	11.4	−1.2
Liberal Democrats	Ignas Stankaitis	440	10.6	−0.1
Reform	Paul Clarke	392	9.5	N/A
Conservative	Richard Wheater	330	8.0	−2.3
Conservative	Mohamed Kamara	266	6.4	−3.0
Conservative	Rasim Sen	231	5.6	−1.9
Independent	Lucy Carrington	109	2.6	+0.1
Rejected ballots		21		
Turnout		4,144	34.50	+4.94
Registered electors		12,020		
Green gain from Labour		Swing		
Green gain from Labour		Swing		
Green gain from Labour		Swing		

=== Nunhead & Queen's Road ===
Nunhead & Queen's Road (3)
Party	Candidate	Votes	%	±%
Green	Catherine Dawkins	2,683	55.0	+16.7
Green	Claire Sheppard	2,672	54.8	+15.5
Green	Richard Taylor	2,328	47.7	+15.5
Labour	Gavin Edwards	1,713	35.1	−17.4
Labour	Sandra Rhule	1,649	33.8	−17.5
Labour	Marq Bailey	1,623	33.3	−18.4
Reform	Darryl Pitt	276	5.7	N/A
Conservative	Novelette Ellis	223	4.6	−0.9
Conservative	Gavin Outteridge	190	3.9	−0.9
Liberal Democrats	Eddie Heywood	184	3.8	−1.1
Liberal Democrats	Luisa Porritt	167	3.4	−0.2
Conservative	Tarsilo Ugarte-Onuluk	127	2.6	−2.1
Liberal Democrats	Fabio Tresoldi	116	2.4	−1.0
Rejected ballots		14		
Turnout		4,879	40.33	+6.23
Registered electors		12,102		
Green gain from Labour		Swing		
Green gain from Labour		Swing		
Green gain from Labour		Swing		

=== Old Kent Road ===
Old Kent Road (3)
Party	Candidate	Votes	%	±%
Labour	Evelyn Akoto	1,907	46.3	−24.2
Labour	Richard Livingstone	1,576	38.3	−24.8
Green	Alexandra Austin	1,525	37.0	+18.5
Labour	Michael Situ	1,494	36.3	−24.2
Green	Christopher Payne	1,316	31.9	N/A
Reform	Tony Sharp	555	13.5	+9.8
Liberal Democrats	Tom Giles	437	10.6	−1.0
Southwark Independent Socialists	Sharon Noonan-Gunning	394	9.6	N/A
Liberal Democrats	Emily Tester	353	8.6	−2.2
Conservative	Rachel Wolf	316	7.7	−4.6
Liberal Democrats	Jazmin McMullen	313	7.6	−2.1
Conservative	Edward Heckels	311	7.5	−3.3
Conservative	Adithya Avadhani	232	5.6	−3.0
Communist League	Julie Crawford	81	2.0	N/A
Rejected ballots		20		
Turnout		4,120	33.09	+5.86
Registered electors		12,452		
Labour hold		Swing		
Labour hold		Swing		
Green gain from Labour		Swing		

=== Peckham ===
Peckham (3)
Party	Candidate	Votes	%	±%
Green	Ryan Cox	1,597	43.6	N/A
Labour	Sabina Emmanuel	1,570	42.9	−36.6
Green	Dean Peters	1,538	42.0	N/A
Green	Storm Poorun	1,473	40.2	N/A
Labour	Barrie Hargrove	1,462	39.9	−37.1
Labour	Cleo Soanes	1,418	38.7	−34.9
Conservative	Chinonye Anumodu	213	5.8	−4.2
Reform	Maurice Acton	203	5.5	N/A
Conservative	Babatunde Awolesi	203	5.5	−4.1
Conservative	Andrew Woodruff	191	5.2	−2.1
Liberal Democrats	Philomena Ofodu	175	4.8	−5.9
Liberal Democrats	Nena Linforth-Hall	173	4.7	−3.9
Liberal Democrats	Jacky Tran	164	4.5	−3.2
Rejected ballots		21		
Turnout		3,662	32.26	+6.46
Registered electors		11,352		
Green gain from Labour		Swing		
Labour hold		Swing		
Green gain from Labour		Swing		

=== Peckham Rye ===
Peckham Rye (2)
Party	Candidate	Votes	%	±%
Labour	Victoria Mills	1,702	43.9	−17.0
Labour	Renata Hamvas	1,689	43.6	−19.0
Green	Francisca Mayambala	1,550	40.0	+17.4
Green	Steven Sheppard	1,461	37.7	+17.5
Reform	Michael Barnard	279	7.2	N/A
Conservative	Alex Simpson	251	6.5	−2.1
Conservative	Ian Twinn	188	4.9	−2.5
Liberal Democrats	Lorraine Zuleta	178	4.6	−1.8
Liberal Democrats	Adi Dar	164	4.2	−2.1
Rejected ballots		8		
Turnout		3,873	51.45	+12.04
Registered electors		7,528		
Labour hold		Swing		
Labour hold		Swing		

=== Rotherhithe ===
Rotherhithe (3)
Party	Candidate	Votes	%	±%
Green	Colin Boyle	1,345	30.8	+16.0
Labour	Stephanie Cryan	1,317	30.2	−22.8
Green	Kath Whittam	1,251	28.7	−17.6
Green	Aadi Venkatesh	1,179	27.0	+12.6
Labour	Bethan Roberts	1,104	25.3	−23.9
Labour	Tom Murray	1,101	25.2	−21.1
Liberal Democrats	Vikas Aggarwal	956	21.9	−1.5
Liberal Democrats	JK Doran	908	20.8	+0.1
Liberal Democrats	Sorcha Ní Chonghaile	848	19.4	+1.6
Reform	Tatiana Hernandez	570	13.1	N/A
Reform	Andy Kekwick	568	13.0	N/A
Reform	Peter Way	539	12.4	N/A
Independent	Barry Duckett	315	7.2	N/A
Conservative	James Hatt	229	5.3	−6.0
Conservative	Aditya Chathli	211	4.8	−4.8
Conservative	Christopher Mottau	206	4.7	−4.8
Rejected ballots		13		
Turnout		4,361	39.49	+8.27
Registered electors		11,037		
Green gain from Labour		Swing		
Labour hold		Swing		
Green gain from Labour		Swing		

=== Rye Lane ===
Rye Lane (3)
Party	Candidate	Votes	%	±%
Labour	Jasmine Ali	2,285	45.1	−22.9
Labour	Esme Dobson	2,249	44.4	−17.2
Green	Reginald Popoola	2,123	41.9	+14.5
Green	Rouge Hawk	2,075	41.0	+22.1
Green	Danny Lester	2,045	40.4	N/A
Labour	David Parton	2,039	40.3	−18.0
Liberal Democrats	Clare Donachie	332	6.6	−6.5
Liberal Democrats	James Gurling	250	4.9	−2.2
Conservative	Mark Davies	214	4.2	−3.3
Reform	Jason Valentine	214	4.2	N/A
Liberal Democrats	Guy Hotchin	211	4.2	−2.7
Conservative	Peter Felix	197	3.9	−3.9
Reform	Alfredo Iorio	196	3.9	N/A
Reform	Elizabeth Simpson	193	3.8	N/A
Conservative	Oliver Wooller	153	3.0	−4.1
Rejected ballots		15		
Turnout		5,063	45.01	+13.08
Registered electors		11,253		
Labour hold		Swing		
Labour hold		Swing		
Green gain from Labour		Swing		

=== South Bermondsey ===
South Bermondsey (3)
Party	Candidate	Votes	%	±%
Labour	Fatmata Bah	1,402	31.9	−22.1
Labour	Andy Bates	1,400	31.9	−15.0
Labour	Sunny Lambe	1,301	29.6	−21.1
Liberal Democrats	Kathleen Heather	1,265	28.8	−8.7
Green	Sandra Lane	1,221	27.8	N/A
Liberal Democrats	Gordon Mackay	1,091	24.8	−9.8
Liberal Democrats	Vinayak Banerjee	1,018	23.2	−10.9
Green	Peter Reder	960	21.9	N/A
Green	Timothy Wright	933	21.2	N/A
Reform	Laura Collins	725	16.5	N/A
Conservative	Harriet Gould	314	7.1	−2.7
Conservative	Colin West	251	5.7	−3.9
Conservative	Ravi Gidwani	206	4.7	−4.1
Rejected ballots		13		
Turnout		4,393	37.90	+4.32
Registered electors		11,594		
Labour hold		Swing		
Labour hold		Swing		
Labour hold		Swing		

=== St George's ===
St George's (2)
Party	Candidate	Votes	%	±%
Liberal Democrats	Graham Neale	823	39.5	−4.3
Liberal Democrats	Lina Usma	586	28.1	−20.7
Green	Ruben Duendia	510	24.5	+13.8
Green	Nita Woods	509	24.4	N/A
Labour	Diana Chichande	505	24.2	−15.2
Labour	Tom Heys	492	23.6	−15.1
Reform	Suzie Bridgen	188	9.0	N/A
Reform	William Jackson	177	8.5	N/A
Conservative	Nick Hoile	128	6.1	−0.5
Conservative	Thomas Philpott	117	5.6	+0.2
Rejected ballots		4		
Turnout		2,083	37.01	−1.06
Registered electors		5,637		
Liberal Democrats hold		Swing		
Liberal Democrats hold		Swing		

=== St Giles ===
St Giles (3)
Party	Candidate	Votes	%	±%
Green	Rachael Penny	2,363	46.1	+15.0
Green	Callum Fowler	2,240	43.7	+25.1
Green	Andy Higson	2,214	43.2	N/A
Labour	Ellie Cumbo	2,149	41.9	−26.3
Labour	Ian Wingfield	2,084	40.6	−17.5
Labour	Jason Ochere	2,040	39.8	−22.0
Liberal Democrats	Poddy Clark	304	5.9	−4.8
Conservative	Robert Broomhead	254	5.0	−3.0
Reform	David Christian	249	4.9	N/A
Reform	Warren Smith	226	4.4	N/A
Conservative	Lindsay Chathli	203	4.0	−3.1
Liberal Democrats	Josh Sharman	191	3.7	−4.6
Liberal Democrats	Dillon Yeh	173	3.4	−4.5
Conservative	Edith Okparaocha	155	3.0	−3.0
Rejected ballots		17		
Turnout		5,129	44.04	+10.29
Registered electors		11,645		
Green gain from Labour		Swing		
Green gain from Labour		Swing		
Green gain from Labour		Swing		

=== Surrey Docks ===
Surrey Docks (3)
Party	Candidate	Votes	%	±%
Liberal Democrats	Richard MacMillan	1,297	32.4	−9.1
Liberal Democrats	Adam Hood	1,290	32.3	−8.2
Liberal Democrats	Jane Salmon	1,253	31.3	−14.8
Green	Francesca Corscadden	1,226	30.7	+4.9
Green	Omnya Ahmed	1,086	27.2	N/A
Green	Danny Draper	1,050	26.3	N/A
Labour	Moya O'Rourke	791	19.8	−14.4
Labour	Henry Bottomley	743	18.6	−14.4
Labour	Adam Smith	708	17.7	−11.0
Reform	Selcuk Cosar	583	14.6	N/A
Conservative	Jane Reid	351	8.8	−3.7
Conservative	Alexander Wilson	333	8.3	−3.3
Conservative	Joseph Omeji	223	5.6	−5.2
Build Party	Alex Baynham	149	3.7	N/A
Rejected ballots		17		
Turnout		3,998	40.09	+8.02
Registered electors		9,975		
Liberal Democrats hold		Swing		
Liberal Democrats hold		Swing		
Liberal Democrats hold		Swing		
