= Goose Green (ward) =

Electoral ward in the London borough of Southwark

- Electoral ward for the Southwark London Borough Council
- Goose Green ward boundaries since 2018
- Borough: Southwark
- County: Greater London
- Population: 13,612 (2021)
- Electorate: 10,501 (2022)
- Major settlements: East Dulwich
- Area: 1.107 square kilometres (0.427 sq mi)

Current electoral ward
- Created: 2018
- Number of members: 3
- Councillors: Eloise Waldon-Day; James McAsh; George Grime
- Created from: The Lane, East Dulwich, Newington, Peckham Rye, South Camberwell
- GSS code: E05011103

Goose Green is an electoral ward in the London Borough of Southwark. The ward was first used in the 2018 elections. It returns three councillors to Southwark London Borough Council.

== List of councillors ==
Seat	Councillor	Took office	Left office	Party	Election
1	Victoria Olisa	2018	2022	Labour	2018
2	James McAsh (Note: James McAsh changed parties in 2026.)	2018	Incumbent	Labour	2018, 2022 2026
2	James McAsh	2018	Incumbent	Green	2018, 2022 2026
3	Charlie Smith	2018	2026	Labour	2018, 2022
1	Portia Mwangangye	2022	2026	Labour	2022
1	Eloise Waldon-Day	2026	Incumbent	Green	2026
3	George Grime	2026	Incumbent	Green	2026

== Southwark council elections ==
=== 2026 election ===
The election took place on 7 May 2022.

Goose Green (3)
Party	Candidate	Votes	%	±%
Green	Eloise Waldon-Day	2,168	40.2	+17.9
Green	James McAsh	2,108	39.0	−16.5
Green	George Grime	1,984	36.7	+21.5
Liberal Democrats	James Barber	1,729	32.0	+9.2
Labour	Portia Mwangangye	1,447	26.8	−32.8
Liberal Democrats	Kaz Doyle	1,383	25.6	+8.0
Labour	Liam McGrath	1,343	24.9	−30.6
Liberal Democrats	Luke McSorley	1,327	24.6	+8.3
Labour	Charlie Smith	1,271	23.5	−26.9
Reform	Damian Cluskey	232	4.3	N/A
Reform	Marcus Walford	223	4.1	N/A
Conservative	Domonic Garriques	204	3.8	−3.6
Reform	Simon West	201	3.7	N/A
Conservative	Simon Johnson	185	3.4	−3.6
Conservative	Kole Gjikolaj	168	3.1	−3.5
Rejected ballots		11		
Turnout		5,399	50.81	+10.95
Registered electors		10,632		
Green gain from Labour		Swing		
Green gain from Labour		Swing		
Green gain from Labour		Swing		

=== 2022 election ===
The election took place on 5 May 2022. The turnout of 60.7% was the highest of any electoral ward in Greater London.

2022 Southwark London Borough Council election: Goose Green (3)
Party	Candidate	Votes	%	±%
Labour	Portia Mwangangye	2,495	59.6	▲9.9
Labour	James McAsh	2,323	55.5	▲12.7
Labour	Charlie Smith	2,108	50.4	▲7.7
Liberal Democrats	Clare Donachie	955	22.8	▼2.4
Green	Philip Collins	932	22.3	▲8.1
Liberal Democrats	Michael Green	736	17.6	▼2.8
Liberal Democrats	Sophie Roach	684	16.3	▼19.7
Green	David Jennings	636	15.2	▲7.0
Women's Equality	Claire Webb	414	9.9	▼12.6
Conservative	Michael Poole-Wilson	311	7.4	▲0.4
Conservative	Qin Hong	294	7.0	▼1.5
Conservative	Adam van den Broek	275	6.6	▼0.8
Turnout		4,186	39.86	−4.37
Labour hold		Swing		
Labour hold		Swing		
Labour hold		Swing		

=== 2018 election ===
The election took place on 3 May 2018.

2018 Southwark London Borough Council election: Goose Green (3)
Party	Candidate	Votes	%	±%
Labour	Victoria Olisa	2,372	49.7	
Labour	James McAsh	2,042	42.8	
Labour	Charlie Smith	2,039	42.7	
Liberal Democrats	James Barber	1,719	36.0	
Liberal Democrats	Clare Donachie	1,202	25.2	
Women's Equality	Claire Empson	1,075	22.5	
Liberal Democrats	Michael Green	974	20.4	
Green	Rosemary Ades	679	14.2	
Conservative	David Bradbury	408	8.5	
Green	David Jennings	394	8.2	
Conservative	Robert Broomhead	354	7.4	
Conservative	Michael Poole-Wilson	334	7.0	
Green	Dale Latchford	311	6.5	
Turnout		4,776	44.23	
Labour win (new seat)				
Labour win (new seat)				
Labour win (new seat)				
