= Southwark Town Hall =

Southwark Town Hall may refer to:

- Walworth Town Hall, referred to as Southwark Town Hall before 1965
- Camberwell Town Hall, London, referred to as Southwark Town Hall from 1965 to 2009
- 160 Tooley Street, the home of Southwark Council since 2009
