= North Walworth =

Electoral ward in London, England

- Electoral ward for the Southwark London Borough Council
- Borough: London Borough of Southwark
- County: Greater London
- Population: 18,159 (2021)
- Major settlements: Walworth
- Area: 0.8228 km

Current electoral ward
- Created: 2018
- Number of members: 3
- Councillors: Rebecca Corn; Sam Foster; Vanessa Threadgold

North Walworth is an electoral ward in the London Borough of Southwark. The ward was first used in the 2018 elections and elects three councillors to Southwark London Borough Council.

== Geography ==
The ward is named after the district of North Walworth.

== Councillors ==
Election	Councillors		
2018	Darren Merrill (Labour Party)	Martin Seaton (Labour Party)	Rebecca Lury (Labour Party)
2022	Darren Merrill (Labour Party)	Martin Seaton (Labour Party)	Naima Ali (Labour Party)
2026	Rebecca Corn (Green Party)	Sam Foster (Green Party)	Vanessa Threadgold (Green Party)

== Elections ==
=== 2022 ===
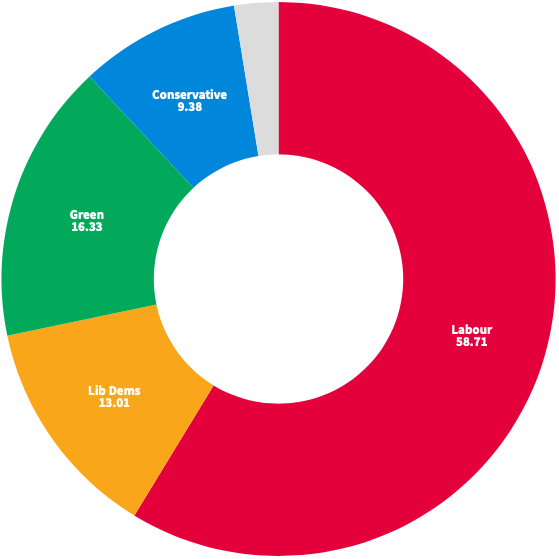

North Walworth (3)
Party	Candidate	Votes	%	±%
Labour	Naima Ali	1,906	60.5	−1.7
Labour	Darren Merrill*	1,771	56.2	+1.7
Labour	Martin Seaton*	1,672	53.1	−2.8
Green	Peter Baffoe	652	20.7	+5.4
Liberal Democrats	Thomas James	453	14.4	−0.9
Green	Steven Lehmann	424	13.5	+2.6
Green	Thomas Wedell	413	13.1	+2.8
Liberal Democrats	Ryan Kingsbury	396	12.6	−1.8
Liberal Democrats	Faisal Maramazi	337	10.7	−1.9
Conservative	Craig Cox	324	10.3	−0.1
Conservative	Christine Wallace	295	9.4	−0.7
Conservative	Diako Tanou	237	7.5	−1.6
Independent	Lucy Carrington	78	2.5	−2.0
Turnout		3,149	29.56	−0.10
Labour hold		Swing		
Labour hold		Swing		
Labour hold		Swing		

=== 2018 ===
North Walworth (3)
Party	Candidate	Votes	%	±%
Labour	Rebecca Lury*	1,726	62.2	
Labour	Martin Seaton*	1,552	55.9	
Labour	Darren Merrill*	1,512	54.5	
Green	Peter Baffoe	425	15.3	
Liberal Democrats	Emily Hirst	424	15.3	
Liberal Democrats	Daniel Beckley	400	14.4	
Liberal Democrats	Edward Sainsbury	349	12.6	
Green	Guy Mannes-Abbott	303	10.9	
Conservative	Alex Deane	289	10.4	
Green	Lina Usma	287	10.3	
Conservative	Michael Champion	279	10.1	
Conservative	Ben Bitek-Omach	253	9.1	
Independent	Lucy Carrington	124	4.5	
Majority				
Turnout		2,774	29.66	
Labour win (new seat)				
Labour win (new seat)				
Labour win (new seat)				

== See also ==
- List of electoral wards in Greater London
