= St Thomas the Apostle College =

School in Southwark, UK

St. Thomas the Apostle College

Location
- Hollydale Road; Nunhead, London, SE15 2EB; England; 51.4715°N 0.0562°W

Information
- Type: Voluntary aided school Comprehensive school
- Religious affiliation: Roman Catholic
- Established: 1965
- Local authority: Southwark
- Department for Education URN: 100857 Tables
- Ofsted: Reports
- Chair: Joseph Reed
- Executive headteacher: Serge Cefai
- Headteacher: Eamon Connolly
- Gender: Boys (with a co-educational Sixth Form)
- Age: 11 to 18
- Website: http://www.stac.uk.com/

St. Thomas the Apostle College is a Roman Catholic comprehensive secondary school for boys in Nunhead, London. A co-educational sixth form was opened in 2015.

The school was rebuilt and the new school building was opened by the Archbishop of Southwark, Peter Smith, in January 2013. The original Catholic chapel, an important feature in the life of the school, was retained and is the focus for the Catholic and pastoral life of the students.

In September 2015, St Thomas the Apostle College expanded its provision by opening a co-educational Sixth Form.

The College was the winner of the 2024 Basketball England, Education Institution of the Year award.

== History of the college ==
St. Thomas the Apostle College opened in September 1965 as St. Thomas the Apostle School. The initial intake came from two schools – English Martyrs and St Francis. In September 1967 boys from Archbishop Amigo also joined. The founder headmaster was Mr W. Uden and his first deputy was Mr. D. Crawford.

The college became grant maintained in September 1994 and became known as St. Thomas The Apostle College. In 1998 the college reverted to a voluntary aided status.

There are four houses, named after four English martyrs from the sixteenth century during the reign of Elizabeth I – Griffith, Gunstone, Saint John Jones and Saint John Rigby. Some confusion can be found in the details of the houses, because St. John Jones went by the name of 'Griffith' during the sixteenth century.

== Notable former pupils ==
- Alex Addai, footballer
- Dennis Adeniran, footballer
- Peter Babudu, politician
- Tyrone Berry, footballer
- Cody Drameh, footballer
- Romain Esse, footballer
- Dickson Etuhu, footballer
- Kelvin Etuhu, footballer
- Danny Haynes, footballer
- Roy Kennedy, politician
- Nathanael Lessore, author
- Ademola Lookman, footballer
- Michael Mison, footballer
- Patrick Murray, actor
- Nyron Nosworthy, footballer
- Emmanuel Onariase, footballer
- Nigel Quashie, footballer
- Fred Ridgeway, actor
- Michael Timlin, footballer
