= Dulwich Wood (ward) =

Electoral ward in London, England

- Electoral ward for the Southwark London Borough Council
- Borough: London Borough of Southwark
- County: Greater London
- Population: 10,314 (2021)
- Major settlements: Kingswood Estate
- Area: 3.033 km²

Current electoral ward
- Created: 2018
- Seats: 2

Dulwich Wood is an electoral ward in the London Borough of Southwark. The ward was formed from the former College ward, being first used in the 2018 elections, and elects two councillors to Southwark London Borough Council.

== Geography ==
The ward covers the Kingswood Estate and its surrounding areas, and is named after Dulwich Wood.

== Councillors ==
Election	Councillors	
2026	Ruth Bannister (Labour Party)	Sean Hannigan (Labour Party)|

== Elections ==
=== 2026 ===
Dulwich Wood (2)
Party	Candidate	Votes	%	±%
Labour	Ruth Bannister	1,496	43.1	−15.0
Labour	Sean Hannigan	1,274	36.7	−16.1
Green	Anna Crowley	1,065	30.7	+16.1
Green	Ralph Smyth	816	23.5	+3.6
Conservative	Lewis Jones	523	15.1	−7.9
Conservative	Guy Matthews	506	14.6	−7.4
Liberal Democrats	Andrew MacKay	306	8.8	−1.0
Reform	James Lucas	290	8.4	N/A
Liberal Democrats	Aiken Furlong	289	8.3	−1.4
Reform	John Whiteford	267	7.7	N/A
Rejected ballots		10		
Turnout		3,471	46.17	+3.77
Registered electors		7,528		
Labour hold		Swing		
Labour hold		Swing		

=== 2022 ===
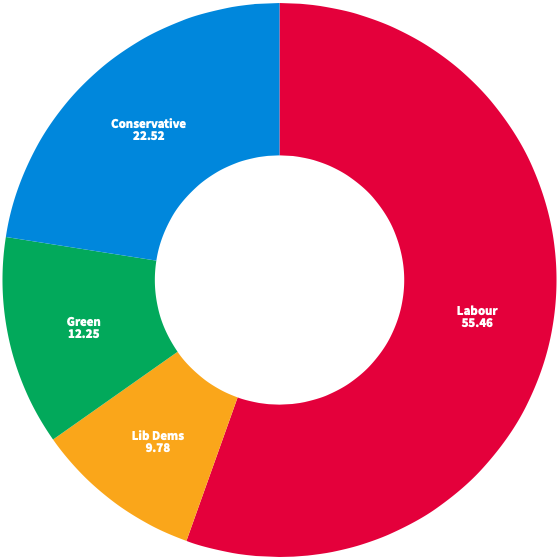

Dulwich Wood (2)
Party	Candidate	Votes	%	±%
Labour	Catherine Rose*	1,783	58.1	▼1.0
Labour	Andy Simmons*	1,621	52.8	▼5.7
Conservative	Lindsay Chathli	706	23.0	▲0.8
Conservative	Peter Heaton-Jones	675	22.0	▲1.5
Green	Guy Fairbairn	449	14.6	▲5.6
Green	Vincent Matley	303	9.9	▲2.2
Liberal Democrats	Iain Johncock	300	9.8	▼1.2
Liberal Democrats	Aiken Furlong	299	9.7	▲0.4
Turnout		3,120	42.40	+1.85
Labour hold		Swing		
Labour hold		Swing		

=== 2018 ===
Following ward boundary changes, this ward was made up from the former ward of college, but is significantly smaller.

Dulwich Wood (2)
Party	Candidate	Votes	%	±%
Labour	Catherine Rose*	1,802	59.1	
Labour	Andy Simmons*	1,782	58.5	
Conservative	Lindsay Chathli	678	22.2	
Conservative	John Cope	626	20.5	
Liberal Democrats	Andrew Mackay	335	11.0	
Liberal Democrats	Steven Gauge	282	9.3	
Green	Christopher Glenn	275	9.0	
Green	Dale Rapley	235	7.7	
Majority				
Turnout		3,048	40.55	
Labour win (new seat)				
Labour win (new seat)				

== See also ==
- List of electoral wards in Greater London
