= Dulwich Hill (ward) =

Electoral ward in London, England

- Electoral ward for the Southwark London Borough Council
- Borough: London Borough of Southwark
- County: Greater London
- Population: 9,563 (2021)
- Major settlements: Dulwich Hill
- Area: 1.382 km²

Current electoral ward
- Created: 2018
- Seats: 2
- Councillors: Tori Griffiths; Janice White

Dulwich Hill is an electoral ward in the London Borough of Southwark. The ward was first used in the 2018 elections and elects two councillors to Southwark London Borough Council.

== Geography ==
The ward is named after the district of Dulwich Hill.

== Councillors ==
Election	Councillors	
2018	Maggie Browning (Labour Party)	Jon Hartley (Labour Party)
2022	Maggie Browning (Labour Party)	Jon Hartley (Labour Party)
2026	Tori Griffiths (Labour Party)	Janice White (Green Party)

== Elections ==
=== 2022 ===
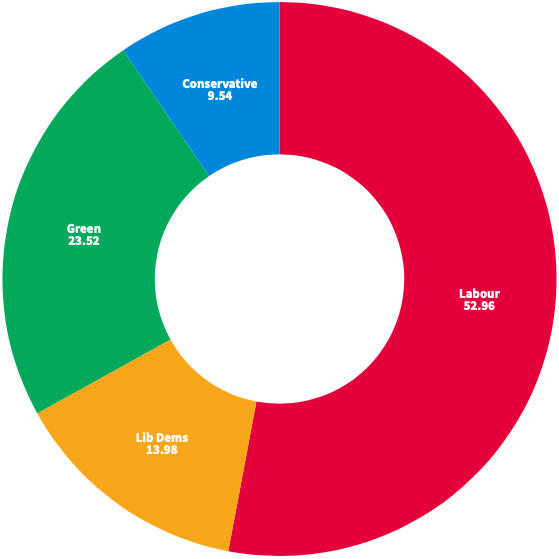

Dulwich Hill (2)
Party	Candidate	Votes	%	±%
Labour	Maggie Browning*	1,846	68.0	▲3.4
Labour	Jon Hartley*	1,298	47.8	▼9.5
Green	Myrtle Bruce-Mitford	698	25.7	▲9.4
Liberal Democrats	Tara Copeland	489	18.0	▲4.2
Liberal Democrats	Thomas Rogers	341	12.6	▲0.8
Conservative	Rupert Watson	289	10.7	▼0.8
Conservative	Edith Okparaocha	277	10.2	▼0.5
Turnout		2,713	38.97	+0.06
Labour hold		Swing		
Labour hold		Swing		

=== 2018 ===
Following ward boundary changes, this ward is made up of parts of the former wards of East Dulwich, college and Peckham Rye.

Dulwich Hill (2)
Party	Candidate	Votes	%	±%
Labour	Maggie Browning	1,823	64.6	
Labour	Jon Hartley*	1,618	57.3	
Green	Myrtle Bruce-Mitford	460	16.3	
Liberal Democrats	Jonathan Mitchell	390	13.8	
Liberal Democrats	Michael Bukola	334	11.8	
Conservative	Rachel Wolf	327	11.5	
Green	Jamie Vincent	322	11.4	
Conservative	Edith Okparaocha	302	10.7	
Majority				
Turnout		2,824	38.91	
Labour win (new seat)				
Labour win (new seat)				

== See also ==
- List of electoral wards in Greater London
