= Downings Roads Moorings =

Coordinates: 51.50212°N 0.07008°W

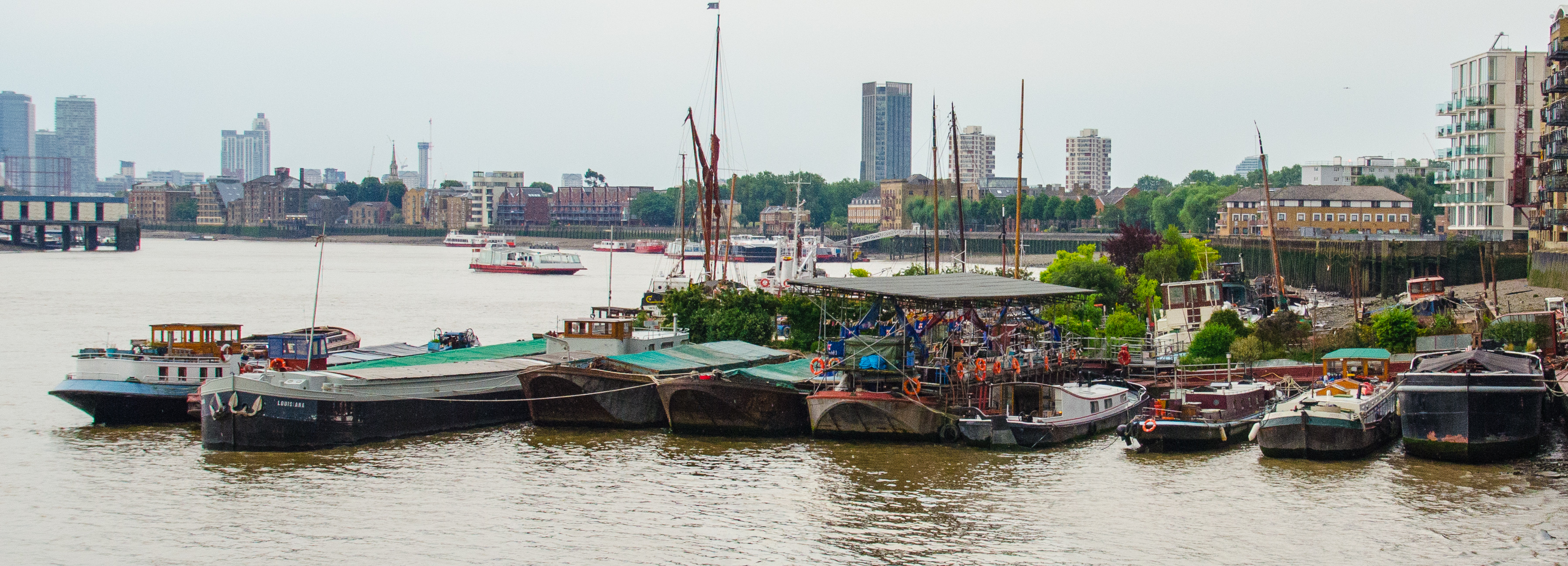
Downings Roads Moorings

Downings Roads Moorings is a mooring for barges on the River Thames near Tower Bridge that is home to a small community of houseboat dwellers in Central London. In 2003 and 2004, they were threatened with eviction by Southwark Council. The members of the community appealed. The then Mayor of London Ken Livingstone commented in a letter to Southwark Council that "The principle of retaining the moorings is supported by the London Plan policy 4C.19 and supporting text contained in paragraphs 4.117 and 4.118. The mix of uses proposed for these moorings should be seen as broadly acceptable in the context of a multi functional Blue Ribbon Network as long as there are appropriate amenity and environmental safeguards in place." Their eviction was quashed in late 2004.

As of 2013, the walkways between the moorings have been turned into a water-borne urban garden, known as the Floating Barge Gardens or Garden Barge Square.
