= London Mutual =

London Mutual may refer to:

- London Mutual Credit Union, a savings and loans co-operative, based in Peckham
- The Royal London Mutual Insurance Society, trading as Royal London Group
