= St Giles (Southwark ward) =

- Electoral ward for the Southwark London Borough Council
- St Giles ward boundaries since 2018
- Borough: Southwark
- County: Greater London
- Population: 15,945 (2021)
- Electorate: 11,314 (2022)
- Area: 1.213 square kilometres (0.468 sq mi)

Current electoral ward
- Created: 1965–2002 (first creation); 2018 (second creation)
- Number of members: 3
- Councillors: Eleanor Cumbo; Jason Ochere; Ian Wingfield
- GSS code: E05011115 (2018–present)

St Giles is an electoral ward in the London Borough of Southwark. The ward was originally created in 1965, revised in 1968 and 1978, and abolished in 2002. It was created again in 2018. It returns three councillors to Southwark London Borough Council.

== Southwark council elections since 2018 ==
There was a revision of ward boundaries in Southwark in 2018 and the ward of St Giles was recreated.

=== 2022 election ===
The election took place on 5 May 2022.

2022 Southwark London Borough Council election: St Giles
Party	Candidate	Votes	%	±%
Labour	Eleanor Cumbo	2,606	68.2	+6.1
Labour	Jason Ochere	2,360	61.8	+9.3
Labour	Ian Wingfield	2,217	58.1	+5.1
Green	Eleanor Margolies	1,186	31.1	−4.1
Green	Bryan Symons	712	18.6	−5.4
Liberal Democrats	Rebecca Kadritzke	408	10.7	+0.5
Liberal Democrats	Christopher Annous	316	8.3	+1.2
Conservative	Sarah Leivers	306	8.0	+1.5
Liberal Democrats	Thomas Chesterman	300	7.9	+2.0
Conservative	Edward Heckels	270	7.1	+0.9
Conservative	Christopher Mottau	230	6.0	+0.2
Turnout		3,819	33.75	−0.73
Labour hold		Swing		
Labour hold		Swing		
Labour hold		Swing		

=== 2018 election ===
The election took place on 3 May 2018.

2018 Southwark London Borough Council election: St Giles
Party	Candidate	Votes	%	±%
Labour	Radha Burgess	2,508	62.1	
Labour	Ian Wingfield	2,141	53.0	
Labour	Jason Ochere	2,118	52.5	
Green	Eleanor Margolies	1,420	35.2	
Green	Susie Wheeldon	971	24.0	
Green	Paula Orr	813	20.1	
Liberal Democrats	Vanessa MacNaughton	410	10.2	
Liberal Democrats	Timothy Brown	287	7.1	
Conservative	Oliver Wooller	263	6.5	
Conservative	Graham Davison	250	6.2	
Liberal Democrats	John Munro	239	5.9	
Conservative	Adam Pimlott	233	5.8	
Majority				
Turnout		4,038	34.48	
Labour win (new seat)				
Labour win (new seat)				
Labour win (new seat)				

== 1978–2002 Southwark council elections ==
St Giles ward boundaries from 1978 to 2002

There was a revision of ward boundaries in Southwark in 1978.

=== 1998 election ===
The election took place on 7 May 1998.

1998 Southwark London Borough Council election: St Giles
Party	Candidate	Votes	%	±%
Labour	Stephanie Elsy	1,288	58.8	−4.5
Labour	Anthony Ritchie	1,251	57.1	−5.2
Labour	Dora Dixon-Fyle	1,216	55.5	−4.9
Liberal Democrats	Stuart Carr	365	16.7	−2.3
Liberal Democrats	Alison Farrow	344	15.7	−3.0
Green	Glynis Bell	336	15.3	N/A
Liberal Democrats	Samantha McDonough	335	15.3	−3.3
Conservative	Tania Brisby	236	10.8	±0.0
Conservative	Jeremy Hart	203	9.3	−1.4
Socialist Labour	Eileen Miles	184	8.4	N/A
Conservative	Margaret Fordham	182	8.3	−1.8
Turnout		2,191	29.1	−0.3
Labour hold				
Labour hold				
Labour hold				

=== 1994 election ===
The election took place on 5 May 1994.

1994 Southwark London Borough Council election: St Giles
Party	Candidate	Votes	%	±%
Labour	Vincent Feiner	1,654	67.87	▲9.47
Labour	Anthony Ritchie	1,627		
Labour	William Skelly	1,579		
Liberal Democrats	Mark Allen	496	20.57	▲9.44
Liberal Democrats	Sandra Mason	489		
Liberal Democrats	Roy Ashworth	487		
Conservative	Clive Jones	283	11.56	▼4.89
Conservative	Hugh McKinney	280		
Conservative	Peter Lengyel	264		
Registered electors		8,918		▲38
Turnout		2,626	29.45	▼3.07
Rejected ballots		13	0.50	▲0.33
Labour hold				
Labour hold				
Labour hold				
