= Peter Babudu, Baron Babudu =

British politician

The Right Honourable The Lord Babudu
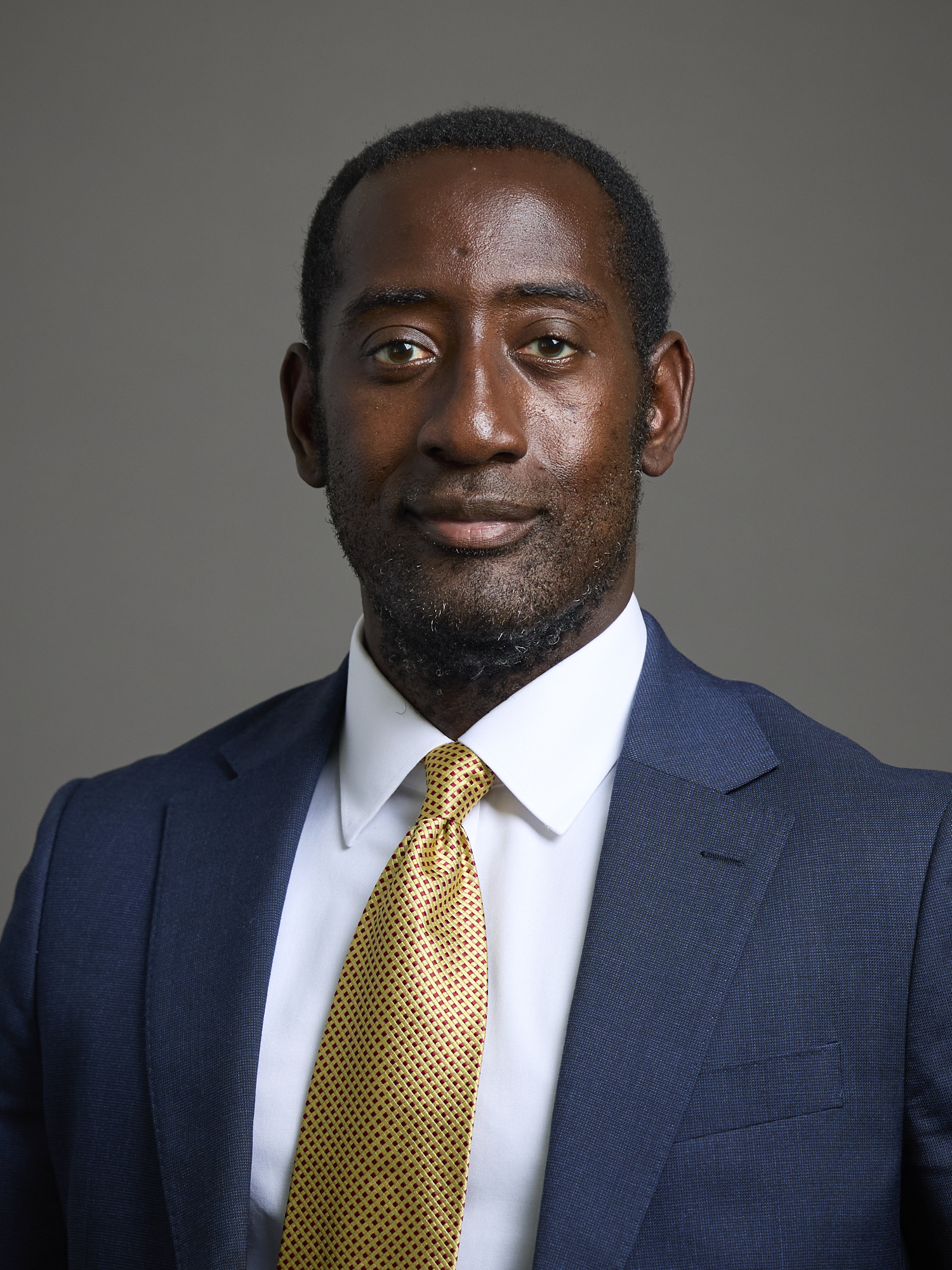
- Official portrait, 2026

Member of the House of Lords
- Lord Temporal
- Life peerage 16 January 2026

Personal details
- Party: Labour
- Education: Lincoln College, Oxford; Birkbeck, University of London

Peter Bonyiah Babudu, Baron Babudu is a British politician and executive.

== Early life ==
Babudu grew up off Friary Road in South London. He attended St Francis Catholic Primary School and then St Thomas the Apostle School. He graduated with a degree in Philosophy, Politics and Economics from Lincoln College, Oxford and a Master of Science (MSc) in Development Studies from Birkbeck, University of London.

== Career ==
Babudu is executive director of Impact on Urban Health. He is a member of Lincoln College Oxford's Anti-Racism Commission. He was chair of the Blagrave Trust.

Babudu was councillor for Rye Lane ward on Southwark London Borough Council. In the 2024 United Kingdom general election, he applied to be a candidate in Camberwell and Peckham to succeed Harriet Harman. He was given a life peerage in December 2025 as part of the 2025 Political Peerages; he was created as Baron Babudu, of Peckham in the London Borough of Southwark on 16 January 2026.
