= Irina von Wiese =

British politician

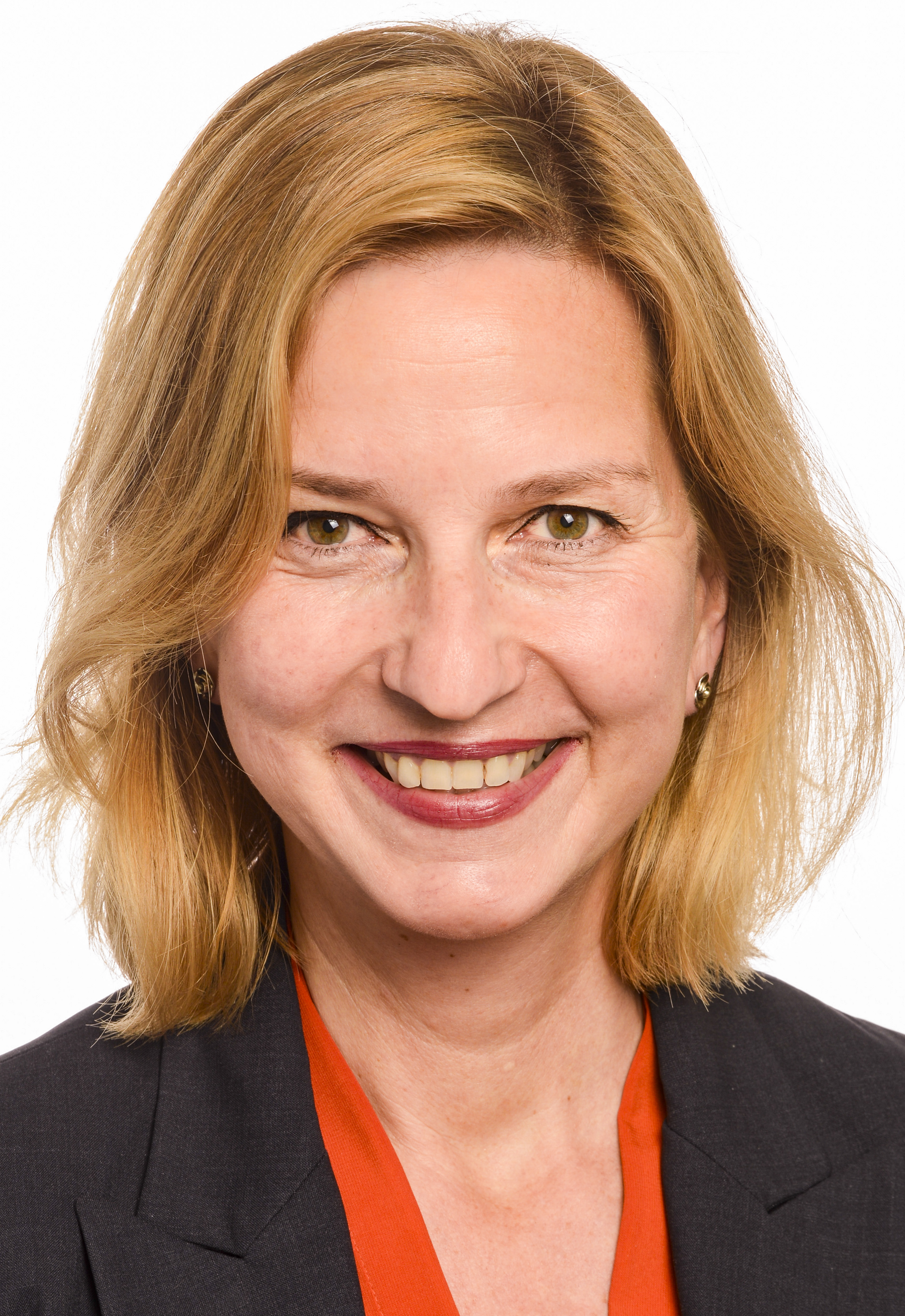
- Official European Parliament portrait, 2019

Member of the European Parliament for London
- In office 2 July 2019 – 31 January 2020
- Preceded by: Dr Charles Tannock
- Succeeded by: Constituency abolished

Southwark London Borough Councillor for Borough and Bankside
- Incumbent
- Assumed office 6 May 2022

Personal details
- Born: 11 September 1967 (age 59) Cologne, West Germany (now Germany)
- Party: Liberal Democrats
- Children: 1
- Education: Harvard University

Irina Stephanie von Wiese und Kaiserswaldau (born 11 September 1967) is a British politician, who was a Liberal Democrat Member of the European Parliament (MEP) for London between 2019 and the United Kingdom's withdrawal from the EU.

== Career ==
In a council by-election in 2017, she stood unsuccessfully for election in the ward of Avonmore and Brook Green in Hammersmith and Fulham, coming third. She unsuccessfully stood in the Ravenscourt Park ward at the 2018 Hammersmith and Fulham borough election.

She was elected a Member of the European Parliament for the London region in the 2019 European Parliament election, on the Liberal Democrat party list, assuming office on 2 July 2019. She sat within the Renew Europe group of liberal political parties and served as Vice-Chair on the European Parliament's Subcommittee on Human Rights (DROI).

Until at least August 2019, she was formerly the Liberal Democrat prospective parliamentary candidate for Hammersmith in the 2019 United Kingdom general election. She was an unsuccessful candidate for the 2021 London Assembly election. She stood again in the 2024 London Assembly election, but did not get elected.

She was elected as a councillor for Southwark London Borough Council in May 2022 for Borough and Bankside ward.

== Personal life ==
Wiese holds both German and British citizenship. She earned a Master of Public Administration (MPA) degree from Harvard University. She has one teenage daughter and has housed refugees in her London home since 2016, working with the charity Refugees at Home.
