= Old Kent Road (ward) =

Electoral ward in London, England

- Electoral ward for the Southwark London Borough Council
- Borough: London Borough of Southwark
- County: Greater London
- Population: 19,369 (2021)
- Major settlements: Old Kent Road
- Area: 1.913 km²

Current electoral ward
- Created: 2018
- Seats: 3
- Councillors: Evelyn Akoto; Richrd Livingstone; Alexandra Austin

Old Kent Road is an electoral ward in the London Borough of Southwark. The ward was first used in the 2018 elections and elects three councillors to Southwark London Borough Council.

== Geography ==
The ward is named after Old Kent Road.

== Councillors ==
Election	Councillors		
2022	Evelyn Akoto (Labour Party)	Richard Livingstone (Labour Party)	Michael Situ (Labour Party)
2026	Evelyn Akoto (Labour Party)	Richard Livingstone (Labour Party)	Alexandra Austin (Green Party)

== Elections ==
=== 2022 ===
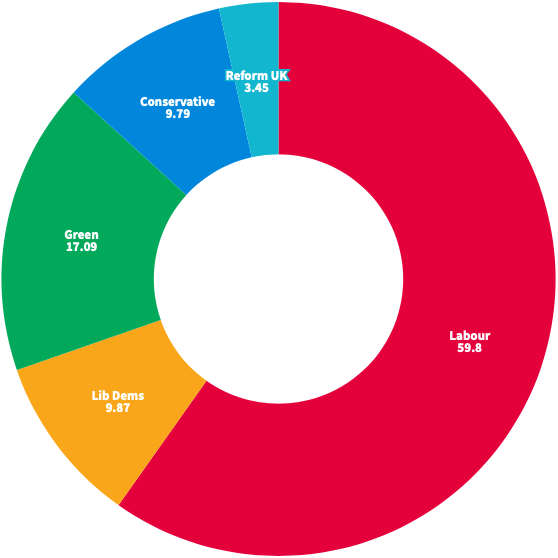

Old Kent Road (3)
Party	Candidate	Votes	%	±%
Labour	Evelyn Akoto*	2,283	70.5	+0.4
Labour	Richard Livingstone*	2,046	63.1	−4.7
Labour	Michael Situ*	1,959	60.5	−3.8
Green	Sandra Lane	599	18.5	+6.7
Conservative	Roman Alexander	400	12.3	+2.9
Liberal Democrats	Keira Kyriacou	375	11.6	−3.9
Conservative	Derek Fordham	351	10.8	+1.9
Liberal Democrats	Moulka Beddar	350	10.8	−1.6
Liberal Democrats	Paul Kyriacou	314	9.7	−3.5
Conservative	Abel Png	278	8.6	+0.3
Reform	John Cronin	121	3.7	N/A
Turnout		3,240	27.23	−0.73
Labour hold		Swing		
Labour hold		Swing		
Labour hold		Swing		

== See also ==
- List of electoral wards in Greater London
