= Borough and Bankside =

Electoral ward in Southwark, England

- Electoral ward for the Southwark London Borough Council
- Borough and Bankside ward boundaries since 2018
- Borough: Southwark
- County: Greater London
- Population: 9,013 (2021) (Note: 2021 Census data reported for 2022 ward boundaries)
- Electorate: 6,382 (2022)
- Area: 1.011 square kilometres (0.390 sq mi)

Current electoral ward
- Created: 2018
- Councillors: 3
- Created from: Cathedrals
- GSS code: E05011095

Borough and Bankside is an electoral ward in the London Borough of Southwark. The ward was first used in the 2018 elections. It returns three councillors to Southwark London Borough Council.

== List of councillors ==
Term	Councillor	Party
2018–2022	Adele Morris	Liberal Democrats
2018–2022	David Noakes	Liberal Democrats
2018–present	Victor Chamberlain	Liberal Democrats
2022–2026	Irina Von Wiese	Liberal Democrats
2022–present	David Watson	Liberal Democrats
2026–present	Hellen Benavides	Liberal Democrats

== Southwark council elections ==
=== 2026 election ===
The election took place on 7 May 2026.

2026 Southwark London Borough Council election: Borough and Bankside (3)
Party	Candidate	Votes	%	±%
Liberal Democrats	Victor Chamberlain	927	40.1	−16.0
Liberal Democrats	Hellen Benavides	864	37.4	−16.5
Liberal Democrats	David Watson	804	34.8	−16.8
Green	Samuel Aurelius	573	24.8	N/A
Green	Sam Hills	549	23.8	N/A
Green	Alastair Ritchie	531	23.0	N/A
Labour	Jack Green	512	22.2	−10.7
Labour	Ruth Wilson	496	21.5	−10.2
Labour	Hadi Sharifi	434	18.8	−12.9
Reform	Simon Vardigans	278	12.0	N/A
Conservative	Graham Davison	194	8.4	−1.7
Conservative	Richard Packer	193	8.4	−2.2
Conservative	Barry Joseph	189	8.2	−0.7
Rejected ballots		4		
Turnout		2,309	34.37	−0.13
Registered electors		6,719		
Liberal Democrats hold		Swing		
Liberal Democrats hold		Swing		
Liberal Democrats hold		Swing		

=== 2022 election ===
The election took place on 5 May 2022.

2022 Southwark London Borough Council election: Borough and Bankside (3)
Party	Candidate	Votes	%	±%
Liberal Democrats	Victor Chamberlain	1,236	56.1	▲6.3
Liberal Democrats	Irina Von Wiese	1,187	53.9	▲1.6
Liberal Democrats	David Watson	1,136	51.6	▼0.6
Labour	Ronald Harley	725	32.9	▲1.9
Labour	Maren White	699	31.7	▲1.0
Labour	Theophilus Toweh	698	31.7	▲2.9
Conservative	Daniel Callaghan	223	10.1	▲1.5
Conservative	Jason Richards	212	9.6	▲1.2
Conservative	Vignesh Murthy	195	8.9	▲1.4
TUSC	Charlie Kennedy	85	3.9	New
Turnout		2,202	34.50	−1.52
Liberal Democrats hold		Swing		
Liberal Democrats hold		Swing		
Liberal Democrats hold		Swing		

=== 2018 election ===
The election took place on 3 May 2018.

2018 Southwark London Borough Council election: Borough and Bankside (3)
Party	Candidate	Votes	%	±%
Liberal Democrats	Adele Morris	1,258	52.3	
Liberal Democrats	David Noakes	1,257	52.2	
Liberal Democrats	Victor Chamberlain	1,197	49.8	
Labour	Lorin Bell-Cross	746	31.0	
Labour	Gloria Ponle	739	30.7	
Labour	Aman Thakar	693	28.8	
Conservative	Robert Ferguson	207	8.6	
Conservative	Suzie Dider-Garnham	201	8.4	
Conservative	Anthony McNamee	180	7.5	
Green	Peter Hamilton	158	6.6	
Green	Maren White	147	6.1	
Green	William Leuchars	122	5.1	
Women's Equality	Eileen Scholes	118	4.9	
Socialist (GB)	Kevin Parkin	27	1.1	
Majority				
Turnout		2,406	36.02	
Liberal Democrats win (new seat)				
Liberal Democrats win (new seat)				
Liberal Democrats win (new seat)				
