= Rye Lane (ward) =

- Electoral ward for the Southwark London Borough Council
- Rye Lane ward boundaries since 2018
- Borough: Southwark
- County: Greater London
- Population: 14,471 (2021) (Note: 2021 Census data reported for 2022 ward boundaries)
- Electorate: 10,791 (2022)
- Area: 1.283 square kilometres (0.495 sq mi)

Current electoral ward
- Created: 2018
- Councillors: 3
- GSS code: E05011113

Rye Lane is an electoral ward in the London Borough of Southwark. The ward was first used in the 2018 elections. It returns three councillors to Southwark London Borough Council.

== List of councillors ==
Term	Councillor	Party
2018–present	Jasmine Ali	Labour
2018–2022	Peter Babudu	Labour
2018–2022	Nick Dolezal	Labour
2022–present	Esme Dobson	Labour
2022–2024	Chloe Tomlinson	Labour
2024–present	David Parton	Labour

== Southwark council elections ==
=== 2024 by-election ===
The by-election on 4 July 2024 took place on the same day as the United Kingdom general election. It followed the resignation of Chloe Tomlinson.

2024 Rye Lane by-election
Party	Candidate	Votes	%	±%
Labour	David Parton	3,349		
Green	Claire Sheppard	2,015		
Liberal Democrats	Max Shillam	458		
Conservative	Peter Felix	438		
Turnout				
Labour hold		Swing		

=== 2022 election ===
The election took place on 5 May 2022.

2022 Southwark London Borough Council election: Rye Lane
Party	Candidate	Votes	%	±%
Labour	Jasmine Ali	2,343	68.0	−3.5
Labour	Esme Dobson	2,123	61.6	−2.7
Labour	Chloe Tomlinson	2,008	58.3	+0.4
Green	Peter Reder	943	27.4	+10.8
Green	Alexander van Vliet	653	18.9	+2.6
Liberal Democrats	Amy Glover	451	13.1	+2.6
Conservative	Peter Felix	268	7.8	−0.5
Conservative	Alys Denby	259	7.5	−0.5
Conservative	Barry Joseph	243	7.1	−0.6
Liberal Democrats	Andras Juhasz	243	7.1	−2.0
Liberal Democrats	James Kean	238	6.9	−0.5
TUSC	Beth Powell	114	3.3	N/A
Turnout		3,446	31.93	−1.19
Labour hold		Swing		
Labour hold		Swing		
Labour hold		Swing		

=== 2018 election ===
The election took place on 3 May 2018.

2018 Southwark London Borough Council election: Rye Lane
Party	Candidate	Votes	%	±%
Labour	Jasmine Ali	2,543	71.5	
Labour	Peter Babudu	2,287	64.3	
Labour	Nick Dolezal	2,060	57.9	
Green	Jagan Devaraj	589	16.6	
Green	Kirsty Lothian	580	16.3	
Green	David Evans	492	13.8	
Liberal Democrats	Veronica Hunt	375	10.5	
Liberal Democrats	Al Scott	325	9.1	
Conservative	Robert Clarke	294	8.3	
Conservative	Damian Fox	283	8.0	
Conservative	Barry Joseph	275	7.7	
Liberal Democrats	Thomas Rogers	262	7.4	
Majority				
Turnout		3,558	33.12	
Labour win (new seat)				
Labour win (new seat)				
Labour win (new seat)				
