= Theatre Peckham =

Coordinates: 51.47440°N 0.08254°W

Theatre Peckham is a community theatre in Peckham, London. The theatre has operated since the 1990s and was originally based in the community hall adjoining the former Camberwell Town Hall . The theatre company Theatre Peckham have operated out of the venue on Havil Street since 1992 and was repurposed as a fully refurbished theatre when the town hall was rebuilt in 2016. Its core values are based on working “to dispel the myth that ‘The Arts’ are only for a privileged few”, a line which featured in the ‘ what is NPV’ section of the 1990s annual reports.

Though the name and venue has changed many times over the years, the focus for Theatre Peckham since 1986 has always been rooted for the community. In doing so, the theatre group, formally new Peckham varieties, have been providing low rate classes and productions in order to provide for the local community, and includes John Boyega among its alumni.

The theatre is run by Artistic Director & CEO Suzann McLean.

== History ==
National Theatre Connections is an annual nationwide youth theatre festival held by the Royal National Theatre. Theatre Peckham is a Connections partner theatre and local partner venue which hosts Connections plays.

== Patrons ==
Theatre Peckham has a number of distinguished patrons who support the theatre's mission to make the arts more accessible, representative and inclusive. These patrons are actor and film producer John Boyega, actress Jenny Agutter OBE, theatre director Paulette Randall, editor Matt Hemley, playwright Roy Williams and MP for Peckham Miatta Fahnbulleh.

== Awards ==
Theatre Peckham has won an Excellence in Musical Theatre Award for its academy training at the Music and Drama Education Awards (2024). In 2022 they won two awards at the Offies, a Special Achievement Award for community collaboration and Best Supporting Performance in a Play for Sebastian Chambers puppeteering in The Wonderful. In 2021 Theatre Peckham received a Southwark Business Resilience Award for its commitment to education, training and skill throughout COVID-19.
