= Peckham (ward) =

Electoral ward in London, England

- Electoral ward for the Southwark London Borough Council
- Borough: London Borough of Southwark
- County: Greater London
- Population: 15,186 (2021)
- Major settlements: Peckham
- Area: 0.8591 km²

Current electoral ward
- Created: 2002
- Seats: 3

Peckham is an electoral ward in the London Borough of Southwark. The ward was first used in the 2002 elections and elects three councillors to Southwark London Borough Council.

== Geography ==
The ward is named after Peckham.

== Councillors ==
Election	Councillors		
2022	Leona Emmanuel (Labour Party)	Barrie Hargrove (Labour Party)	Cleo Soanes (Labour Party)

== Elections ==
=== 2022 ===
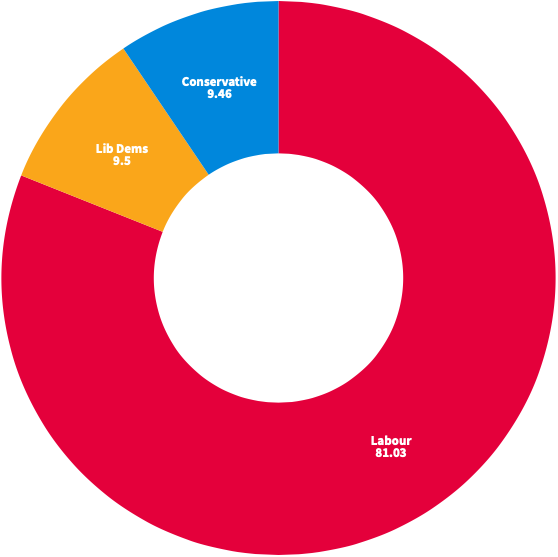

Peckham (3)
Party	Candidate	Votes	%	±%
Labour	Leona Sabina Emmanuel	2,148	79.5	+4.7
Labour	Barrie Hargrove*	2,080	77.0	−0.3
Labour	Cleo Soanes*	1,987	73.6	−0.1
Liberal Democrats	Philomena Ofodu	290	10.7	+5.3
Conservative	Dudley Cowan	269	10.0	+2.8
Conservative	Alfred Daramola	259	9.6	+3.3
Liberal Democrats	Oliver Stanton	232	8.6	+2.6
Liberal Democrats	James Okosun	208	7.7	+2.4
Conservative	Martina Ward	198	7.3	+0.8
Turnout		2,701	25.80	−2.22
Labour hold		Swing		
Labour hold		Swing		
Labour hold		Swing		

=== 2018 ===
Peckham (3)
Party	Candidate	Votes	%	±%
Labour	Barrie Hargrove*	2,215	77.3	
Labour	Johnson Situ*	2,143	74.8	
Labour	Cleo Soanes*	2,112	73.7	
Green	Anthony Griffiths	303	10.6	
Green	Christopher Henderson	287	10.0	
Conservative	John Evans	207	7.2	
Conservative	Martina Ward	187	6.5	
Conservative	Jane MacLaren	181	6.3	
Liberal Democrats	Jeff Hook	171	6.0	
Liberal Democrats	Philomena Ofodu	154	5.4	
Liberal Democrats	Benjamin Johnson*	151	5.3	
Majority				
Turnout		2,864	28.02%	
Labour win (new seat)				
Labour win (new seat)				
Labour win (new seat)				

== See also ==
- List of electoral wards in Greater London
