= 160 Tooley Street =

Municipal building in London, England

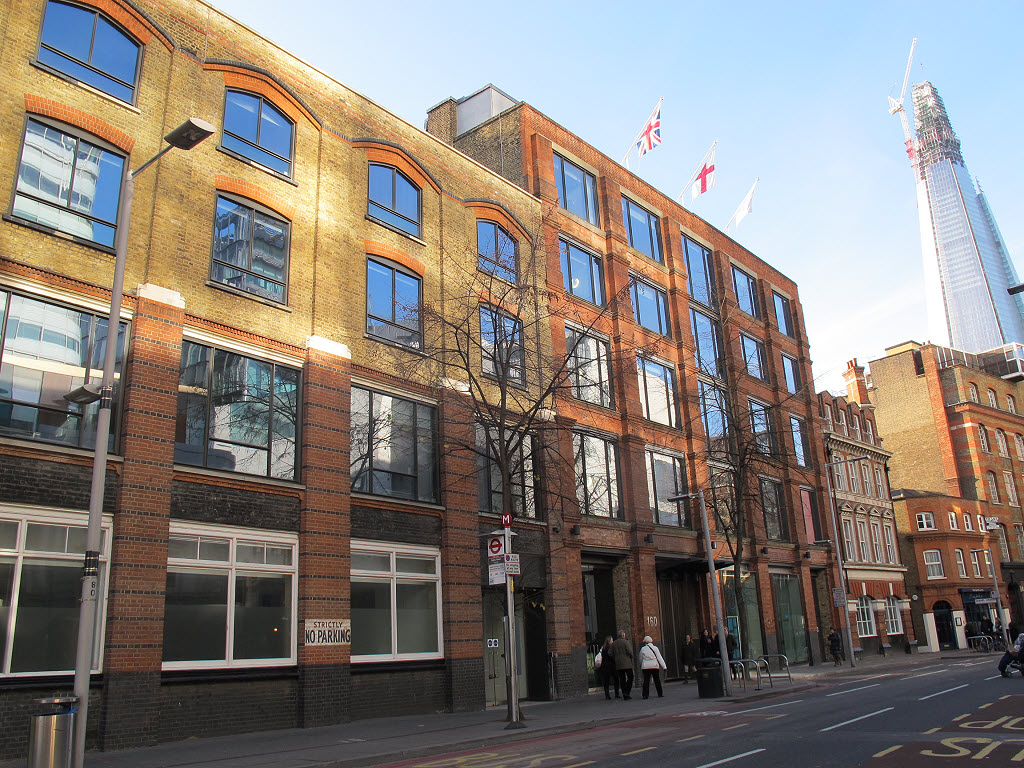
- 160 Tooley Street

- Location within London Borough of Southwark

General information
- Location: Bermondsey, London
- Coordinates: 51.5034°N 0.0807°W
- Inaugurated: 2008
- Cost: £42 million

Design and construction
- Architect: Allford Hall Monaghan Morris

160 Tooley Street is a municipal facility in Tooley Street, Bermondsey, London. It is the headquarters of Southwark London Borough Council.

== History ==
The proposed development combined the refurbishment of some Victorian warehouses with the construction of a modern six-storey office block behind the warehouses. (Note: For much of the 20th century 156 to 164 Tooley Street was occupied by the head office and factory of Hobson and Sons, suppliers of military uniforms, insignia and equipment to the armed forces, before the company consolidated its operations at Thundersley in Essex.) The site was assembled by the developer, Great Portland Estates, at a cost of £19 million in 2004 and the building was forward sold to UBS Global Asset Management for £94 million, before works started, in June 2006.

The new facility was designed by Allford Hall Monaghan Morris, built by Laing O'Rourke at a cost of £42 million and completed in June 2008. The developer had specified that at least 10% of the building's power requirement should be capable of being met from renewable energy.

Southwark London Borough Council, which had previously been based at the ageing Camberwell Town Hall, moved into the completed building, which measured 18,500 square metres (199,000 sq ft), as rental tenants in March 2009. The council acquired the freehold ownership of the building from UBS for £170 million in December 2012. It continues to be the administrative headquarters and meeting place of Southwark London Borough Council and some 2,000 council staff are based in the complex. Memorials to council staff who had died in the First and Second World Wars, which had been recovered from Camberwell Town Hall, were rededicated by the Bishop of Southwark, Christopher Chessun, at Tooley Street in March 2013.
