= Peckham Rye (ward) =

- Electoral ward for the Southwark London Borough Council
- Peckham Rye ward boundaries since 2018
- Borough: Southwark
- County: Greater London
- Population: 10,157 (2021)
- Electorate: 7,300 (2022)
- Area: 1.644 square kilometres (0.635 sq mi)

Current electoral ward
- Created: 1965
- GSS code: E05011111 (2018–present)

Peckham Rye is an electoral ward in the London Borough of Southwark. The ward has existed since the creation of the borough on 1 April 1965 and was first used in the 1964 elections.

== Southwark council elections since 2018 ==
There was a revision of ward boundaries in Southwark in 2018.

=== 2022 election ===
The election took place on 5 May 2022.

2022 Southwark London Borough Council election: Peckham Rye (2)
Party	Candidate	Votes	%	±%
Labour	Renata Hamvas	1,802	62.6	−0.1
Labour	Victoria Mills	1,751	60.9	−2.5
Green	Gerard Bennett	650	22.6	+2.1
Green	Steven Sheppard	581	20.2	N/A
Conservative	Nathan Gamester	247	8.6	+1.3
Conservative	Oliver Wooller	213	7.4	−0.9
Liberal Democrats	Eduardo Reyes	185	6.4	−0.1
Liberal Democrats	Christian Blango	181	6.3	−0.1
Turnout		2,877	39.41	−0.33
Labour hold		Swing		
Labour hold		Swing		
