= London Mutual Credit Union =

British not-for-profit member-owned financial co-operative

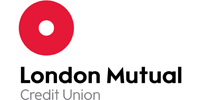
- Type: Credit Union
- Industry: Financial services
- Founded: 1982
- Headquarters: London, SE15; United Kingdom
- Key people: Lakshman Chandrasekera, CEO
- Total assets: £30 million (Jun 2020)
- Website: creditunion.co.uk

London Mutual Credit Union Limited (LMCU) is a not-for-profit member-owned financial co-operative, based in Peckham and operating in the City of Westminster and the London boroughs of Southwark, Lambeth and Camden. The primary lines of business include retail banking, deposit-taking and lending.

Established in 1982, by June 2020, the credit union had over 31,300 members and 3,600 junior members.

== History ==
The Credit Union was originally established for a London-based local authority staff in 1982, (known as Southwark Council Employees Credit Union) by a small group of volunteers. It was formed to address the economic hardship among low paid manual workers and the local Caribbean community. Like other British credit unions at the time, it was a small savings and loans co-operative which offered its members a limited range of financial products and services. Despite being the first credit union in the UK to operate a payroll deduction scheme, Southwark Council Employees Credit Union only recruited between 200 and 300 members from a workforce of over 12,000 in the first nine years of its existence.

From 1991 onwards, Southwark Council Employees Credit Union implemented a range of reforms, including the introduction of improved IT systems and staff development. In 1997, it opened membership to employees of King's College Hospital, under the name Southwark and Kings Employees Credit Union and, in 1999, as Southwark Credit Union, to anyone living or working in the borough.

=== Mergers ===
Throughout its early years, the credit union absorbed a number of smaller credit unions in Southwark. The first of these, in 1997, was Camberwell Health Authority Credit Union (established in 1991), followed, in 2001, by the Camberwell Credit Union (established 1980). In 2010, members of Lambeth Savings and Credit Union (established 2006) voted to transfer engagements to Southwark Credit Union, which adopted the present name, extending its common bond to take in the London Borough of Lambeth.

In 2012, LMCU absorbed the Pimlico Credit Union (established 1980), enlarging its south London base to the City of Westminster. In 2013, it absorbed Camden Plus Credit Union (established 2006), expanding its area of operation to include London Borough of Camden.

== Products ==
In 2012, London Mutual Credit Union became the first British credit union to offer payday loans. The initial 12 months trial for short-term payday loans was completed in 2013. The scheme was funded by the Friends Provident Foundation and the Barclays Community Finance Fund, with project support from the Financial Inclusion Centre. The pilot payday loan received 6,087 applications for an average loan of £238. In the 12-month pilot, 2,923 short-term loans with a value of £687,757 were provided to 1,219 different borrowers. Under the scheme, borrowers could take out a payday loan or spread out repayment over a longer period. 29% of applicants repaid their loan in one month, while 59% of applicants opted to repay their loan over three months. However, in a survey, 66% of applicants said their main reason for taking out a loan with London Mutual was the low cost of borrowing compared to other payday lenders. Only 10% said that the option to repay over a longer period of time was their main reason for choosing the credit union.

According to LMCU, the payday loan pilot saved 1,219 borrowers collectively saved £145,000, or £119 each, compared to borrowing from a high-cost payday lender. The credit union developed its payday and short-term loan products in response to increased use of payday lenders in the London boroughs it serves. Following the completion of the pilot London Mutual Credit Union made its payday loan facility available to anyone living or working in the London boroughs of Southwark, Lambeth, City of Westminster and Camden. Like high-cost payday lenders the credit union allows borrowers to take out a CUOK payday loan online.

=== Regulation ===
Registered under the Industrial and Provident Societies Acts, London Mutual Credit Union is a member of the Association of British Credit Unions Limited.

As a financial institution, it is authorised by the Prudential Regulation Authority and regulated by the Financial Conduct Authority and PRA, who also regulate banks, building societies and insurance companies. London Mutual is also a member of the Financial Services Compensation Scheme. The Financial Services Compensation Scheme can pay compensation to depositors if a credit union is unable to meet its financial obligations. Most depositors – including most individuals and small businesses – are covered.

== See also ==
- Credit unions in the United Kingdom
- British co-operative movement
