= Camberwell Town Hall, London =

Municipal building in London, England

Camberwell Town Hall
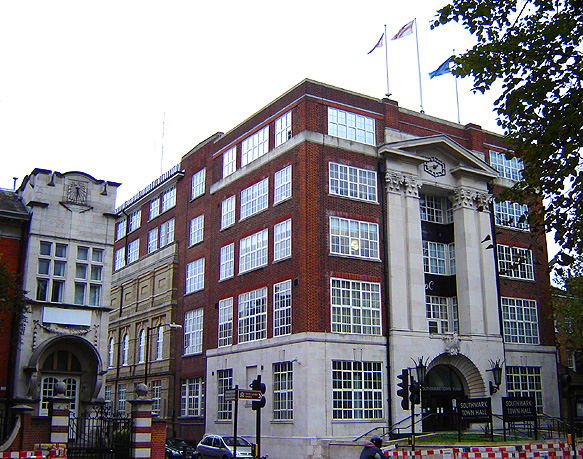
- Camberwell Town Hall

- Shown in Southwark
- 51.4741°N 0.0828°W
- Location: 31 Peckham Road, Camberwell

History
- Built: 1934

Site notes
- Architect(s): Culpin and Bowers
- Architectural style: Classical style

Camberwell Town Hall is a municipal building in Peckham Road, Camberwell, London, England.

== History ==
The building was commissioned to replace an aging 19th century vestry hall on the site which had been designed by Edward Power in a mixture of French Renaissance style and Italianate style for the Parish of St Giles; the old vestry hall was only partially demolished to make way for the current building and significant elements of it are still visible in the western elevation of the new building along Havil Street. The old vestry hall had become the headquarters of the Metropolitan Borough of Camberwell as "Camberwell Town Hall" in 1900.

The new building was designed by Culpin and Bowers in the Classical style and built by Galbraith Brothers. It was officially opened by the mayor, Councillor S. E. Hall, on 10 October 1934. The design involved a symmetrical main frontage with three bays facing onto Peckham Road; the central bay featured an arched doorway with a keystone in the form of the helm of a ship on the ground floor; there was a tall recess on the first, second and third floors flanked by four huge composite order antae with a clock and a pedestal above. Internally, the principal rooms were the council chamber and the mayor's parlour both on the first floor. The council chamber featured the original coved ceiling and pilastered walls, which had been recovered from the vestry hall, together with completely new seating furniture for the council members.

The building took over the role of headquarters of the Metropolitan Borough of Camberwell and continued to be the local seat of government, when the enlarged London Borough of Southwark was formed in 1965. It then became known as "Southwark Town Hall" and benefited from some refurbishment works in the reception area in 1980.

After the council moved to 160 Tooley Street in March 2009, the building was sold to a developer, Alumno Developments, in December 2014. Works to convert the property into student accommodation to a design by Jestico and Whiles for Goldsmiths College were completed in 2016. Memorials to council staff who had died in the First and Second World Wars were taken down during the works and transferred to Tooley Street. The works, which involved extending the building further north along Harvil Street, also facilitated provision of a new auditorium for "Theatre Peckham", which provides performing arts classes for young people, as well as a new café and some self-contained artists' studios within the new complex.
