= Southwark London Borough Council =

Local authority in London

- Coat of arms

- Council logo

Type
- Type: London borough council of the London Borough of Southwark
- Houses: Unicameral

Leadership
- Mayor: Claire Sheppard, Green since 28 May 2026
- Leader: James McAsh, Green since 28 May 2026
- Chief Executive: Althea Loderick since May 2022

Structure
- Seats: 63 councillors
- Political groups: Administration (34) Green (22) Liberal Democrats (12) Other parties (29) Labour (29)
- Length of term: Whole council elected every four years

Elections
- Voting system: Plurality at-large (FPTP)
- Last election: 7 May 2026
- Next election: 2 May 2030

Meeting place
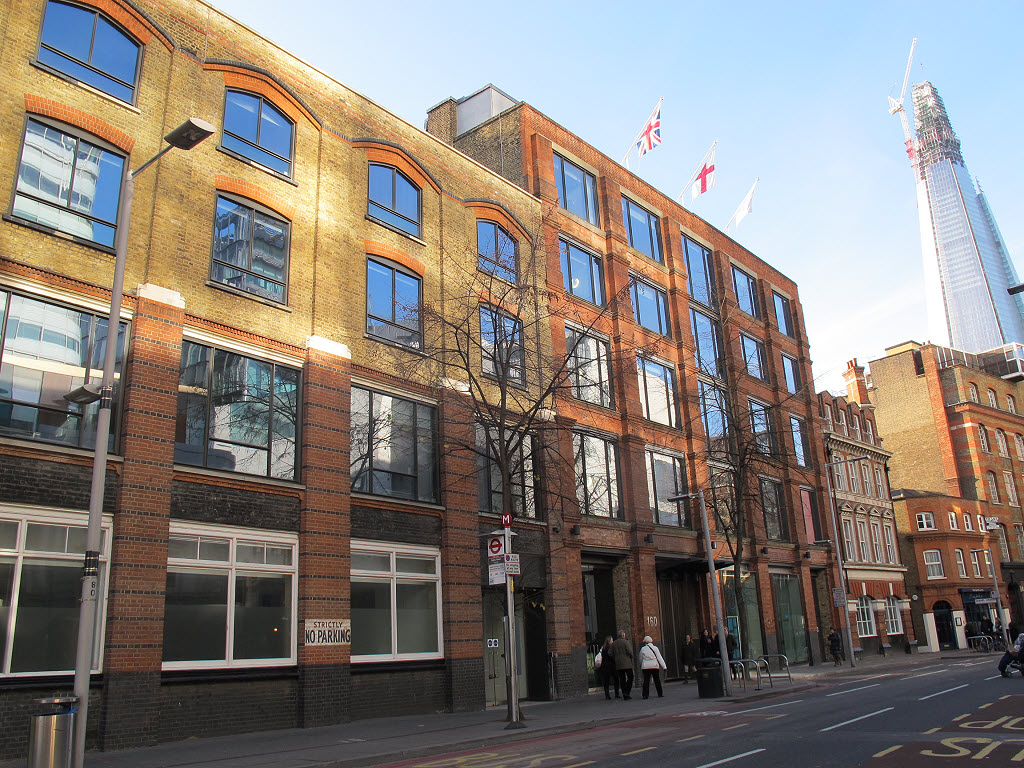
- 160 Tooley Street, London, SE1 2QH

Website
- www.southwark.gov.uk

Southwark London Borough Council, also known as Southwark Council, is the local authority for the London Borough of Southwark in Greater London, England. The council has been under no overall control since May 2026, having previously been under Labour majority control since 2010. The council is based at 160 Tooley Street and is responsible for the provision of a range of services within the borough.

== History ==
Southwark itself had been an ancient borough from at least the 12th century until the 19th century. However, for most of its history it was a manorial property of the neighbouring City of London rather than being a self-governing borough with its own corporation.

From 1856 the area of the modern borough was governed by the Metropolitan Board of Works, which was established to provide services across the metropolis of London. In 1889 the Metropolitan Board of Works' area was made the County of London. From 1856 until 1900 the lower tier of local government within the metropolis comprised various parish vestries and district boards. In 1900 the lower tier was reorganised into metropolitan boroughs, three of which were Bermondsey, Camberwell and Southwark, each with a borough council.

The larger London Borough of Southwark and its council were created under the London Government Act 1963, with the first election held in 1964. For its first year the council acted as a shadow authority alongside the area's three outgoing authorities, being the metropolitan borough councils of Southwark, Bermondsey and Camberwell. The new council formally came into its powers on 1 April 1965, at which point the old boroughs and their councils were abolished. The council's full legal name is the "Mayor and Burgesses of the London Borough of Southwark", but it styles itself Southwark Council.

From 1965 until 1986 the council was a lower-tier authority, with upper-tier functions provided by the Greater London Council. The split of powers and functions meant that the Greater London Council was responsible for "wide area" services such as fire, ambulance, flood prevention, and refuse disposal; with the boroughs (including Southwark) responsible for "personal" services such as social care, libraries, cemeteries and refuse collection. The Greater London Council was abolished in 1986 and its functions passed to the London Boroughs, with some services provided through joint committees. Southwark became a local education authority in 1990 when the Inner London Education Authority was dissolved.

Since 2000 the Greater London Authority has taken some responsibility for highways and planning control from the council, but within the English local government system the council remains a "most purpose" authority in terms of the available range of powers and functions.

From 2006, Southwark commenced implementation of a master data management system in conjunction with IBM UK Ltd., intending to rationalise "a number of disparate computerised systems" in use across the range of functions for which the Council was responsible. The project was abandoned after concerns that the recommended system adopted by Southwark was not satisfactory, but the Council was unsuccessful in its claim against IBM for breach of contract.

== Powers and functions ==
The local authority derives its powers and functions from the London Government Act 1963 and subsequent legislation, and has the powers and functions of a London borough council. It sets council tax and as a billing authority it also collects precepts for Greater London Authority functions and business rates. It sets planning policies which complement Greater London Authority and national policies, and decides on almost all planning applications accordingly. It is also the local education authority.

== Political control ==
The council went under no overall control at the 2026 election, after which a coalition of the Green Party and Liberal Democrats formed to run the council, led by Green councillor James McAsh.

The first election was held in 1964, initially operating as a shadow authority alongside the outgoing authorities until it came into its powers on 1 April 1965. Political control of the council since 1965 has been as follows:

Party in control	Years
Labour	1965–2002
No overall control	2002–2010
Labour	2010–2026
No overall control	2026-present

=== Leadership ===
The role of Mayor of Southwark is largely ceremonial. Political leadership is instead provided by the leader of the council. The leaders since 1965 have been:

Councillor	Party	From	To
Alfred John Kemp	Labour	1965	1968
John O'Grady	Labour	1968	1982
Alan Davis	Labour	1982	1984
Tony Ritchie	Labour	1984	1986
Annie Matthews	Labour	1986	1990
Sally Keeble	Labour	1990	Sept 1993
Jeremy Fraser	Labour	Sept 1993	1997
Niall Duffy	Labour	1997	2000
Stephanie Elsy	Labour	2000	2002
Nick Stanton	Liberal Democrats	2002	May 2010
Peter John	Labour	19 May 2010	16 Sep 2020
Kieron Williams	Labour	16 Sep 2020	9 Jul 2025
Sarah King	Labour	9 Jul 2025	28 May 2026
James McAsh	Green	28 May 2026	

=== Composition ===
Following the 2026 election the composition of the council was:

Party	Councillors
Labour	29
Green	22
Liberal Democrats	12
Total	63

The next election is due in May 2030.

== Cabinet ==
As of June 2026, the composition of the Southwark council executive is as follows:

Post	Councillor	Ward
Leader of the Council	James McAsh	Goose Green
Deputy Leader of the Council; Executive Member for Planning, Infrastructure and Wellbeing	Victor Chamberlain	Borough and Bankside
Executive Member for Public Works and New Homes	Alexandra Austin	Old Kent Road
Executive Member for Inclusive Economy, Equalities and Democracy	Rachel Bentley	North Bermondsey
Executive Member for Education and Care	Rebecca Corn	North Walworth
Executive Member for Finance and General Purposes	Sam Foster	North Walworth
Executive Member for Council Homes	Reginald Popoola	Rye Lane
Executive Member for Parks and Recreation	Vanessa Threadgold	North Walworth
Executive Member for Council Co-ordination and Climate	Eloise Waldon-Day	Goose Green
Executive Member for Community Safety and Engagement	David Watson	Borough and Bankside

== Elections ==
Since the last boundary changes in 2018 the council has comprised 63 councillors representing 23 wards, with each ward electing two or three councillors. Elections are held every four years.

== Wards ==
The wards of Southwark and number of seats:

1. Borough & Bankside (3)
2. Camberwell Green (3)
3. Champion Hill (2)
4. Chaucer (3)
5. Dulwich Hill (2)
6. Dulwich Village (2)
7. Dulwich Wood (2)
8. Faraday (3)
9. Goose Green (3)
10. London Bridge & West Bermondsey (3)
11. Newington (3)
12. North Bermondsey (3)
13. North Walworth (3)
14. Nunhead & Queen's Road (3)
15. Old Kent Road (3)
16. Peckham (3)
17. Peckham Rye (2)
18. Rotherhithe (3)
19. Rye Lane (3)
20. South Bermondsey (3)
21. St George's (2)
22. St Giles (3)
23. Surrey Docks (3)

== Premises ==
The council is based at 160 Tooley Street. The building comprises several converted Victorian warehouses facing the street, with a modern six-storey office building behind, which was completed in 2008. The council moved in during 2009. It initially rented the building, before purchasing it for £170 million in 2012.

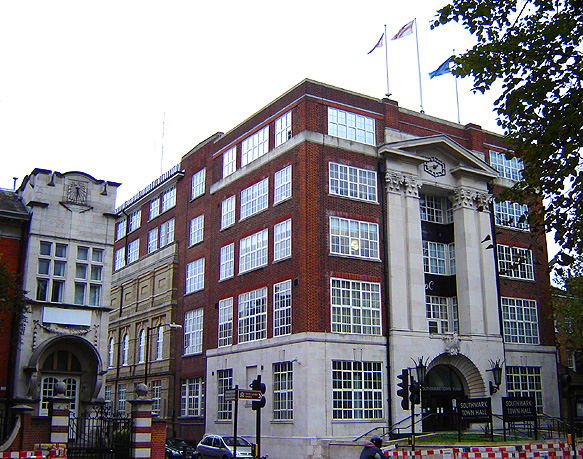
Southwark Town Hall, Camberwell: Council's headquarters until 2009

Prior to 2009 the council was based at Southwark Town Hall, formerly called Camberwell Town Hall, at 31 Peckham Road in Camberwell, which had been completed in 1934 for the old Camberwell Borough Council.

== Universal Credit trial ==
Southwark was one of the first areas where Universal Credit was fully introduced. The Council issued a report in 2018 which was strongly critical of Universal Credit. Rent arrears among council tenants on Universal Credit are much higher than arrears among tenants on traditional benefits. Among two groups of council tenants investigated increase in arrears per claimant averaged between £586 and £309. The report disputed claims by ministers that rent arrears are temporary and notes that there are also arrears from tenants who have been on Universal Credit for over a year. Tenants who have been on Universal Credit for 15 months underpay rent by 7% on average. The report claims, "For now, the government must acknowledge that the current system is unworkable and broken. We strongly argue that the rollout of UC should be halted until radical steps are taken to fix the ongoing issues outlined in this research." Also use of food banks in Southwark has risen by 30% from 2017 to 2018 since Universal Credit was introduced there and 80% of the increase is attributed to Universal Credit. Victoria Mills of Southwark Council said, "Any delay to payments for those who are already under immense financial pressure will result in unrecoverable debt and unacceptable stress on people's lives. (...) A year on from our first research, the issues have simply got worse. We have to act on this evidence now and look at how we can support our residents and the pressure on our services. This situation is echoed across the country. The government needs to take rapid steps to fix universal credit or acknowledge that they have created a system that is unworkable and broken."

== See also ==
- London Mutual Credit Union
