= 2018 Southwark London Borough Council election =

2018 local election in England

2018 Southwark Council election
- 3 May 2018

All 63 seats on Southwark London Borough Council

	First party	Second party
Party	Labour	Liberal Democrats
Last election	48 seats, 44.72%	13 seats, 18.73%
Seats won	49	14
Seat change	▲1	▲1
Popular vote	38,901	15,650
Percentage	53.09%	21.36%
Swing	▲8.37%	▲2.63%
- Map of the results of the 2018 Southwark council election. Labour in red and Liberal Democrats in yellow.
Council control before election
Labour
Council control after election
Labour

The 2018 election for Southwark London Borough Council took place on 3 May 2018, the same day as for other London Boroughs. All 63 seats were up for election.

New boundaries were used, using 23 two- and three-member wards (there were previously 21 three-member wards), following a Local Government Boundary Commission for England review that concluded in 2016. The review reflected demographic growth, shifting seats from the south of the borough to its northwest.

== Results summary ==

Southwark Council election result 2018
Party	Seats	Gains	Losses	Net gain/loss	Seats %	Votes %	Votes	+/−
Labour	49			▲1	77.8	53.09	38,901	▲8.37
Liberal Democrats	14			▲1	22.2	21.36	15,650	▲2.63
Green	0			Steady	0.0	12.04	8,822	▼2.54
Conservative	0			▼2	0.0	10.46	7,664	▼1.95
Women's Equality	0			Steady	0.0	1.63	1,193	New
Independent	0			Steady	0.0	0.84	612	New
UKIP	0			Steady	0.0	0.37	270	▼5.89
CPA	0			Steady	0.0	0.1	71	New
TUSC	0			Steady	0.0	0.08	62	▼0.86
Socialist (GB)	0			Steady	0.0	0.04	27	New

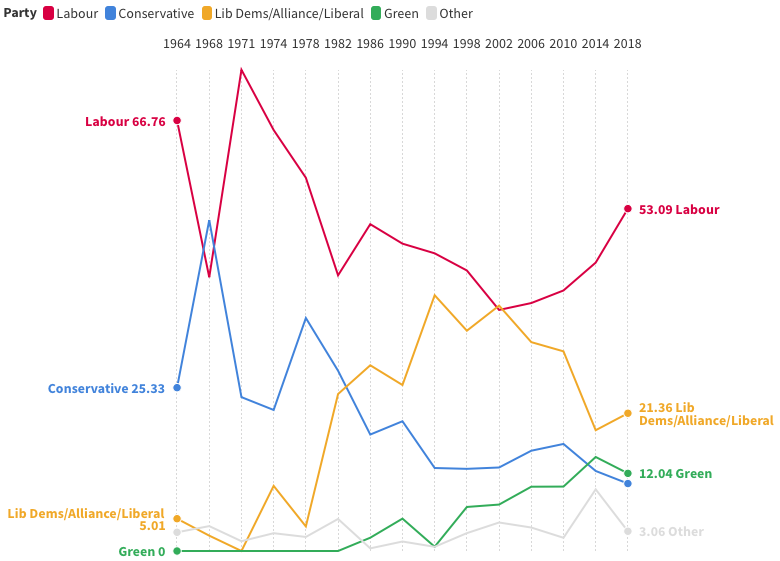
Southwark Council voting history

== Ward results ==
=== Borough & Bankside ===
- Following ward boundary changes, this ward is made up of the northern two thirds of the former Cathedrals ward.

Borough & Bankside (3)
Party	Candidate	Votes	%	±%
Liberal Democrats	Adele Morris*	1,258	52.3	
Liberal Democrats	David Noakes*	1,257	52.2	
Liberal Democrats	Victor Chamberlain	1,197	49.8	
Labour	Lorin Bell-Cross	746	31.0	
Labour	Gloria Ponle	739	30.7	
Labour	Aman Thakar	693	28.8	
Conservative	Robert Ferguson	207	8.6	
Conservative	Suzie Dider-Garnham	201	8.4	
Conservative	Anthony McNamee	180	7.5	
Green	Peter Hamilton	158	6.6	
Green	Maren White	147	6.1	
Green	William Leuchars	122	5.1	
Women's Equality	Eileen Scholes	118	4.9	
Socialist (GB)	Kevin Parkin	27	1.1	
Majority				
Turnout		2,406	36.02	
Liberal Democrats win (new seat)				
Liberal Democrats win (new seat)				
Liberal Democrats win (new seat)				

=== Camberwell Green ===
Camberwell Green (3)
Party	Candidate	Votes	%	±%
Labour Co-op	Dora Dixon-Fyle*	2,234	71.0	
Labour Co-op	Tom Flynn*	2,082	66.1	
Labour Co-op	Kieron Williams*	2,043	64.9	
Green	Tracey Beresford	552	17.5	
Green	Alexis Fidgett	376	11.9	
Conservative	Naomi Anderson	307	9.8	
Green	Paul Ingram	301	9.6	
Conservative	Robert Hayward	286	9.1	
Conservative	Erik O'Connor	254	8.1	
Liberal Democrats	Jason Leech	218	6.9	
Liberal Democrats	Nik Nicol	197	6.3	
Liberal Democrats	Joseph Willie	172	5.5	
Majority				
Turnout		3,148	30.74	
Labour Co-op win (new seat)				
Labour Co-op win (new seat)				
Labour Co-op win (new seat)				

=== Champion Hill ===
- Following ward boundary changes, this new ward is made up from the former ward of South Camberwell, but is significantly smaller.

Champion Hill (2)
Party	Candidate	Votes	%	±%
Labour	Sarah King*	1,519	64.7	
Labour	Peter John*	1,368	58.3	
Green	Michael Millar	368	15.7	
Green	Alexander Howard	329	14.0	
Liberal Democrats	Jonathan Hunt	283	12.1	
Liberal Democrats	Columba Blango	251	10.7	
Conservative	Fraser Schurer-Lewis	184	7.8	
Conservative	Francis Truss	184	7.8	
CPA	Ray Towey	71	3.0	
Majority				
Turnout		2,348	32.79	
Labour win (new seat)				
Labour win (new seat)				

=== Chaucer ===
Chaucer (3)
Party	Candidate	Votes	%	±%
Labour Co-op	Helen Dennis*	1,713	57.7	
Labour Co-op	Karl Eastham*	1,547	52.1	
Labour Co-op	Sirajul Islam	1,463	49.3	
Liberal Democrats	Poddy Clark	764	25.7	
Liberal Democrats	Michael Zreika	633	21.3	
Liberal Democrats	Mackie Sheik	616	20.8	
Green	Winnie Baffoe	336	11.3	
Green	Phil Vabulas	331	11.2	
Conservative	Edward Anyaeji	327	11.0	
Conservative	Laura Collins	313	10.5	
Conservative	George Smith	298	10.0	
Green	Rebecca Warren	213	7.2	
Majority				
Turnout		2,967	28.73	
Labour Co-op win (new seat)				
Labour Co-op win (new seat)				
Labour Co-op win (new seat)				

=== Dulwich Hill ===
Following ward boundary changes, this ward is made up of parts of the former wards of East Dulwich, College and Peckham Rye.

Dulwich Hill (2)
Party	Candidate	Votes	%	±%
Labour	Maggie Browning	1,823	64.6	
Labour	Jon Hartley*	1,618	57.3	
Green	Myrtle Bruce-Mitford	460	16.3	
Liberal Democrats	Jonathan Mitchell	390	13.8	
Liberal Democrats	Michael Bukola	334	11.8	
Conservative	Rachel Wolf	327	11.5	
Green	Jamie Vincent	322	11.4	
Conservative	Edith Okparaocha	302	10.7	
Majority				
Turnout		2,824	38.91	
Labour win (new seat)				
Labour win (new seat)				

=== Dulwich Village ===
Dulwich Village (2)
Party	Candidate	Votes	%	±%
Labour Co-op	Margy Newens	1,755	39.1	
Labour Co-op	Richard Leeming	1,580	35.2	
Conservative	Jane Lyons*	1,306	29.1	
Conservative	Andrew Mitchell*	1,281	28.5	
Liberal Democrats	Brigid Gardner	1,259	28.0	
Liberal Democrats	Ruth Gripper	1,124	25.0	
Green	William Chidley	312	6.9	
Green	Gulnar Hasnain	289	6.4	
Majority				
Turnout		4,492	57.22	
Labour Co-op win (new seat)				
Labour Co-op win (new seat)				

=== Dulwich Wood ===
Following ward boundary changes, this ward was made up from the former ward of College, but is significantly smaller.

Dulwich Wood (2)
Party	Candidate	Votes	%	±%
Labour	Catherine Rose*	1,802	59.1	
Labour	Andy Simmons*	1,782	58.5	
Conservative	Lindsay Chathli	678	22.2	
Conservative	John Cope	626	20.5	
Liberal Democrats	Andrew Mackay	335	11.0	
Liberal Democrats	Steven Gauge	282	9.3	
Green	Christopher Glenn	275	9.0	
Green	Dale Rapley	235	7.7	
Majority				
Turnout		3,048	40.55	
Labour win (new seat)				
Labour win (new seat)				

=== Faraday ===
Faraday (3)
Party	Candidate	Votes	%	±%
Labour	Lorraine Lauder*	1,747	68.2	
Labour	Paul W. Fleming*	1,726	67.4	
Labour	Jack Buck	1,679	65.6	
Green	Liam Hennessy	338	13.2	
Green	Liba Hoskin	308	12.0	
Green	Ignas Galvelis	291	11.4	
Liberal Democrats	Tim Colbourne	228	8.9	
Liberal Democrats	Chris Hudson	226	8.8	
Conservative	Novelette Ellis	214	8.4	
Conservative	Loana Morrison	209	8.2	
Conservative	David Furze	204	8.0	
Liberal Democrats	Lauren Pemberton-Nelson	198	7.7	
Majority				
Turnout		2,560	29.71	
Labour win (new seat)				
Labour win (new seat)				
Labour win (new seat)				

=== Goose Green ===
- Following ward boundary changes, this ward was made up of half of East Dulwich and parts of South Camberwell, The Lane, Village and Peckham Rye wards.

Goose Green (3)
Party	Candidate	Votes	%	±%
Labour	Victoria Olisa	2,372	49.7	
Labour	James McAsh	2,042	42.8	
Labour	Charlie Smith*	2,039	42.7	
Liberal Democrats	James Barber*	1,719	36.0	
Liberal Democrats	Clare Donachie	1,202	25.2	
Women's Equality	Claire Empson	1,075	22.5	
Liberal Democrats	Michael Green	974	20.4	
Green	Rosemary Ades	679	14.2	
Conservative	David Bradbury	408	8.5	
Green	David Jennings	394	8.2	
Conservative	Robert Broomhead	354	7.4	
Conservative	Michael Poole-Wilson	334	7.0	
Green	Dale Latchford	311	6.5	
Majority				
Turnout		4,776	44.23	
Labour win (new seat)				
Labour win (new seat)				
Labour win (new seat)				

=== London Bridge & West Bermondsey ===
- Following ward boundary changes, this ward is made up of most of the former Grange ward, together with the western end of the former Riverside ward.

London Bridge & West Bermondsey (3)
Party	Candidate	Votes	%	±%
Liberal Democrats	Humaira Ali	1,340	45.6	
Liberal Democrats	William Houngbo	1,281	43.6	
Liberal Democrats	Damian Shaun O'Brien*	1,270	43.2	
Labour	Julie Eyles	1,239	42.2	
Labour	John Batteson	1,215	41.3	
Labour	Joseph McDonagh	1,171	39.8	
Conservative	Sir Richard Packer	291	9.9	
Conservative	Hannah Ginnett	221	7.5	
Green	Rubio Werner	215	7.3	
Conservative	Nathan Newport Gay	205	7.0	
Green	John Creely	191	6.5	
Majority				
Turnout		2,939	28.57	
Liberal Democrats win (new seat)				
Liberal Democrats win (new seat)				
Liberal Democrats win (new seat)				

=== Newington ===
In May 2019, Coldwell resigned from Labour in opposition to the then leader Jeremy Corbyn and the parties stance on Brexit. He now sits as an Independent.

Newington (3)
Party	Candidate	Votes	%	±%
Labour	Eleanor Kerslake*	2,137	65.7	
Labour	James Coldwell*	2,082	64.0	
Labour	Alice MacDonald	1,997	61.4	
Liberal Democrats	James Doran	457	14.0	
Green	Kate Belcheva	429	13.2	
Liberal Democrats	Harriet Shone	420	12.9	
Liberal Democrats	Alistair Bigos	406	12.5	
Green	David Powell	354	10.9	
Green	Betiel Mehari	337	10.4	
Conservative	Sue Badman	275	8.5	
Conservative	Will Amor	257	7.9	
Conservative	Joseph Lyons	243	7.5	
Majority				
Turnout		3,254	31.59	
Labour win (new seat)				
Labour win (new seat)				
Labour win (new seat)				

=== North Bermondsey ===
Following boundary changes, this ward is mostly made up of the former ward of Riverside, but also includes an area previously in Rotherhithe ward.

North Bermondsey (3)
Party	Candidate	Votes	%	±%
Liberal Democrats	Anood Al-Samerai*	1,744	49.3	
Liberal Democrats	Eliza Mann*	1,570	44.4	
Liberal Democrats	Hamish McCallum*	1,550	43.8	
Labour	Leona Emmanuel	1,155	32.7	
Labour	Shahina Jaffer	1,109	31.4	
Labour	Jack Taylor	1,051	29.7	
Conservative	Andrew Baker	452	12.8	
Conservative	Luke Johnson	394	11.1	
Conservative	Dan Bridgett	368	10.4	
Green	Clare Cummings	331	9.4	
Green	Kevin Jones	229	6.5	
UKIP	Rosie Beattie	121	3.4	
TUSC	Gary Kandinsky	62	1.8	
Majority				
Turnout		3,537	30.73	
Liberal Democrats win (new seat)				
Liberal Democrats win (new seat)				
Liberal Democrats win (new seat)				

=== North Walworth ===
North Walworth (3)
Party	Candidate	Votes	%	±%
Labour	Rebecca Lury*	1,726	62.2	
Labour	Martin Seaton*	1,552	55.9	
Labour	Darren Merrill*	1,512	54.5	
Green	Peter Baffoe	425	15.3	
Liberal Democrats	Emily Hirst	424	15.3	
Liberal Democrats	Daniel Beckley	400	14.4	
Liberal Democrats	Edward Sainsbury	349	12.6	
Green	Guy Mannes-Abbott	303	10.9	
Conservative	Alex Deane	289	10.4	
Green	Lina Usma	287	10.3	
Conservative	Michael Champion	279	10.1	
Conservative	Ben Bitek-Omach	253	9.1	
Independent	Lucy Carrington	124	4.5	
Majority				
Turnout		2,774	29.66	
Labour win (new seat)				
Labour win (new seat)				
Labour win (new seat)				

=== Nunhead & Queen's Road ===
Nunhead & Queen's Road (3)
Party	Candidate	Votes	%	±%
Labour	Sunil Chopra*	2,305	69.3	
Labour	Gavin Edwards*	2,276	68.4	
Labour	Sandra Rhule*	2,221	66.7	
Green	Rosalie Schweiker	528	15.9	
Green	Steve Barbe	479	14.4	
Green	Bartley Shaw	445	13.4	
Conservative	Domonic Garriques	254	7.6	
Conservative	Andrew Smith	251	7.5	
Conservative	Harry Chathli	249	7.5	
Liberal Democrats	Sarah Mustoe	216	6.5	
Liberal Democrats	Rupert Morris	198	5.9	
Liberal Democrats	Gillian Shields	196	5.9	
Majority				
Turnout		3,328	29.45	
Labour win (new seat)				
Labour win (new seat)				
Labour win (new seat)				

=== Old Kent Road ===
Following ward boundary changes, this ward is made up of the former ward of Livesey, a small southern portion of the former ward of East Walworth and a small southern portion of South Bermondsey.

Old Kent Road (3)
Party	Candidate	Votes	%	±%
Labour	Evelyn Akoto*	2,303	70.1	
Labour	Richard Livingstone*	2,228	67.8	
Labour	Michael Situ*	2,113	64.3	
Liberal Democrats	Gemma Cooper	508	15.5	
Liberal Democrats	Paul Kyriacou	432	13.2	
Liberal Democrats	Tim McNally	407	12.4	
Green	Nick Martin	387	11.8	
Conservative	Dominic Burstin	309	9.4	
Conservative	Simon Kitchen	293	8.9	
Conservative	Chris Mottau	273	8.3	
Majority				
Turnout		3,285	27.96	
Labour win (new seat)				
Labour win (new seat)				
Labour win (new seat)				

=== Peckham ===
Peckham (3)
Party	Candidate	Votes	%	±%
Labour	Barrie Hargrove*	2,215	77.3	
Labour	Johnson Situ*	2,143	74.8	
Labour	Cleo Soanes*	2,112	73.7	
Green	Anthony Griffiths	303	10.6	
Green	Christopher Henderson	287	10.0	
Conservative	John Evans	207	7.2	
Conservative	Martina Ward	187	6.5	
Conservative	Jane MacLaren	181	6.3	
Liberal Democrats	Jeff Hook	171	6.0	
Liberal Democrats	Philomena Ofodu	154	5.4	
Liberal Democrats	Benjamin Johnson*	151	5.3	
Majority				
Turnout		2,864	28.02%	
Labour win (new seat)				
Labour win (new seat)				
Labour win (new seat)				

=== Peckham Rye ===
Peckham Rye (2)
Party	Candidate	Votes	%	±%
Labour	Victoria Mills*	1,891	63.4	
Labour	Renata Hamvas*	1,872	62.7	
Green	Gerard Bennett	612	20.5	
Independent	Claire Sheppard	488	16.3	
Conservative	Matthew Bartholomew	249	8.3	
Conservative	Nathan Gamester	218	7.3	
Liberal Democrats	Robert Skelly	194	6.5	
Liberal Democrats	Derek Partridge	192	6.4	
Majority				
Turnout		2,985	39.74	
Labour win (new seat)				
Labour win (new seat)				

=== Rotherhithe ===
Rotherhithe (3)
Party	Candidate	Votes	%	±%
Labour Co-op	Stephanie Cryan*	1,726	50.2	
Labour Co-op	Kath Whittam*	1,558	45.3	
Labour Co-op	Bill Williams*	1,504	43.7	
Liberal Democrats	Tom Holder	1,142	33.2	
Liberal Democrats	Mel Gordon	1,013	29.4	
Liberal Democrats	Wendy Nowak	994	28.9	
Green	Colin Boyle	517	15.0	
Green	Roger Manser	404	11.7	
Conservative	Kirsten Lindsay	381	11.1	
Conservative	Edward Burton	345	10.0	
Conservative	William Robinson	334	9.7	
Majority				
Turnout		3,440	31.99	
Labour Co-op win (new seat)				
Labour Co-op win (new seat)				
Labour Co-op win (new seat)				

=== Rye Lane ===
Rye Lane (3)
Party	Candidate	Votes	%	±%
Labour	Jasmine Ali*	2,543	71.5	
Labour	Peter Babudu	2,287	64.3	
Labour	Nick Dolezal*	2,060	57.9	
Green	Jagan Devaraj	589	16.6	
Green	Kirsty Lothian	580	16.3	
Green	David Evans	492	13.8	
Liberal Democrats	Veronica Hunt	375	10.5	
Liberal Democrats	Al Scott	325	9.1	
Conservative	Robert Clarke	294	8.3	
Conservative	Damian Fox	283	8.0	
Conservative	Barry Joseph	275	7.7	
Liberal Democrats	Thomas Rogers	262	7.4	
Majority				
Turnout		3,558	33.12	
Labour win (new seat)				
Labour win (new seat)				
Labour win (new seat)				

=== St George's ===
Following ward boundary changes, this ward was made up from the southern third of the former Cathedrals ward.

St George's (2)
Party	Candidate	Votes	%	±%
Liberal Democrats	Maria Linforth-Hall*	884	45.9	
Liberal Democrats	Graham Neale	839	43.6	
Labour	Ellie Cumbo	773	40.2	
Labour	Mark Griffiths	768	39.9	
Green	Ian Pocock	170	8.8	
Conservative	Siobhan Aarons	146	7.6	
Conservative	Kishan Chandarana	137	7.1	
Majority				
Turnout		1,925	37.78	
Liberal Democrats win (new seat)				
Liberal Democrats win (new seat)				

=== St Giles ===
St Giles (3)
Party	Candidate	Votes	%	±%
Labour	Radha Burgess*	2,508	62.1	
Labour	Ian Wingfield*	2,141	53.0	
Labour	Jason Ochere	2,118	52.5	
Green	Eleanor Margolies	1,420	35.2	
Green	Susie Wheeldon	971	24.0	
Green	Paula Orr	813	20.1	
Liberal Democrats	Vanessa MacNaughton	410	10.2	
Liberal Democrats	Timothy Brown	287	7.1	
Conservative	Oliver Wooller	263	6.5	
Conservative	Graham Davison	250	6.2	
Liberal Democrats	John Munro	239	5.9	
Conservative	Adam Pimlott	233	5.8	
Majority				
Turnout		4,038	34.48	
Labour win (new seat)				
Labour win (new seat)				
Labour win (new seat)				

=== South Bermondsey ===
South Bermondsey (3)
Party	Candidate	Votes	%	±%
Labour	Sunny Lambe*	1,787	48.3	
Labour	Leanne Werner	1,754	47.4	
Labour	Leo Pollak*	1,701	46.0	
Liberal Democrats	Gareth Bell	1,324	35.8	
Liberal Democrats	Kirsty Grove	1,261	34.1	
Liberal Democrats	Andrew Tipler	1,133	30.6	
Green	Paul Blackman	268	7.2	
Conservative	Alexander Williams	262	7.1	
Conservative	Ian Twinn	238	6.4	
Conservative	Antoine Morizur-Bruller	233	6.3	
Green	Valerie Remy	223	6.0	
UKIP	Michael King	162	4.4	
UKIP	Toby Prescott	151	4.1	
UKIP	Tony Sharp	135	3.6	
Majority				
Turnout		3,699	32.45	
Labour win (new seat)				
Labour win (new seat)				
Labour win (new seat)				

=== Surrey Docks ===
Surrey Docks (3)
Party	Candidate	Votes	%	±%
Liberal Democrats	Dan Whitehead*	1,475	50.2	
Liberal Democrats	Nicola Salmon	1,358	46.2	
Liberal Democrats	Nick Johnson	1,294	44.0	
Labour	Amy Clarke	911	31.0	
Labour	John Rule	773	26.3	
Labour	Will Tucker	770	26.2	
Conservative	Mark Findell	467	15.9	
Conservative	Hannah Ginnett	440	15.0	
Green	Sandra Lane	437	14.9	
Conservative	Simon Fox	403	13.7	
Majority				
Turnout		2,941	31.47	
Liberal Democrats win (new seat)				
Liberal Democrats win (new seat)				
Liberal Democrats win (new seat)				
