= List of Christopher Wren churches in London =

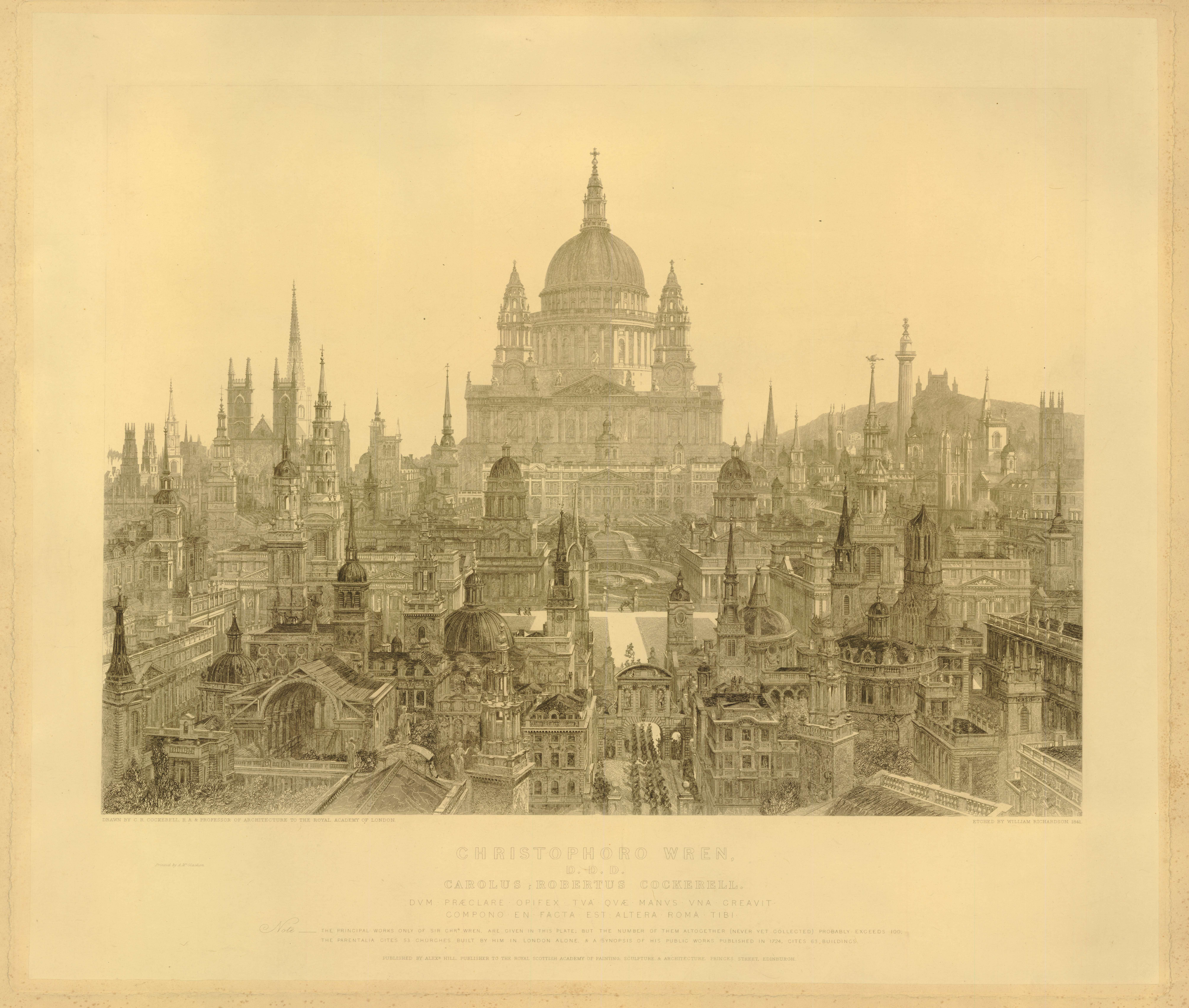
Tribute to the memory of Sir Christopher Wren by Charles Robert Cockerell, showing an array of Wren's churches from around London imagined together

Sir Christopher Wren was 33 years old and near the beginning of his career as an architect when the Great Fire of London in 1666 destroyed many of the city's public buildings, including 88 of its parish churches. Wren's office was commissioned to build 51 replacement churches and St Paul's Cathedral. Many of these buildings survive to this day; others have been substantially altered or rebuilt. Some others were completely or partially destroyed during the German Blitz of 1940–41; others were demolished for different reasons.

== Churches in the City of London ==
Many of Wren's churches were demolished as the population of the City of London declined in the 19th century and more were destroyed or damaged during the Blitz.

=== Survived in original form ===
Image	Name	Location	Date	Listing	Coordinates
	St Benet Paul's Wharf	Queen Victoria Street, Queenhithe, City of London	1677–83	Grade I (1950)	51°30′42.01″N 0°5′57.38″W
	St Clement Eastcheap	Clement's Lane, Candlewick, City of London	1683–87	Grade I (1950)	51°30′40.77″N 0°5′12.81″W
	St Edmund, King and Martyr	Lombard Street, Langbourn, City of London	1670–79	Grade I (1950)	51°30′44.62″N 0°5′10.68″W
	St James Garlickhythe	Garlick Hill, Vintry, City of London	1676–83	Grade I (1950)	51°30′39.99″N 0°5′37.54″W
	St Margaret Lothbury	Lothbury, Coleman Street Ward and Broad Street Ward, City of London	1686–90	Grade I (1950)	51°30′52.91″N 0°5′19.92″W
	St Margaret Pattens	Eastcheap, Billingsgate, City of London	1684–87	Grade I (1950)	51°30′38.75″N 0°4′58.74″W
	St Martin, Ludgate	Ludgate Hill, Farringdon Within, City of London	1677–84	Grade I (1950)	51°30′50.55″N 0°6′6.99″W
	St Mary Abchurch	Abchurch Lane, Candlewick, City of London	1681–86	Grade I (1950)	51°30′42.02″N 0°5′18.05″W
	St Mary Aldermary	Queen Victoria Street, Cordwainer, City of London	1679–82	Grade I (1950)	51°30′46″N 0°05′36″W
	St Michael's Cornhill	Cornhill, Cornhill, City of London	1669–72	Grade I (1950)	51°30′47.50″N 0°5′7.68″W
	St Paul's Cathedral	St Paul's Churchyard, Castle Baynard, City of London	1675-1711	Grade I (1950)	51°30′49″N 0°05′53″W
	St Peter upon Cornhill	Cornhill, Cornhill, City of London	1677–84	Grade I (1950)	51°30′47.7″N 0°5′4.5″W
	St Stephen Walbrook	Walbrook, Walbrook, City of London	1672–79	Grade I (1950)	51°30′45.46″N 0°5′23.71″W

=== Substantially altered before the Blitz ===
Image	Name	Location	Date	Listing	Comment	Coordinates
	St Magnus-the-Martyr	Lower Thames Street, Bridge, City of London	1671–87	Grade I (1950)	altered after London Bridge was widened in 1762	51°30′33.41″N 0°5′10.81″W
	St Mary-at-Hill	Lovat Lane, Billingsgate, City of London	1670–76	Grade I (1950)	altered in 1787–88 and 1826–27	51.510069°N 0.08374°W

=== Substantially rebuilt after the Blitz ===
The Blitz in 1940–1941 damaged nearly all the churches in the City of London and many were nearly destroyed leaving just the outer walls and tower. However most of them were rebuilt to Wren's original design.

Image	Name	Location	Date	Listing	Comment	Coordinates
	St Andrew-by-the-Wardrobe	Queen Victoria Street, Castle Baynard, City of London	1685–95	Grade I (1950)	rededicated in 1961	51°30′44.44″N 0°6′4.89″W
	St Andrew, Holborn	Holborn Viaduct, Farringdon Without, City of London	1686–87	Grade I (1950)	re-opened in 1961	51°31′2.10″N 0°6′24.14″W
	St Anne and St Agnes	Gresham Street, Aldersgate, City of London	1676–87	Grade I (1950)	rededicated in 1966	51°30′59″N 0°5′47″W
	St Bride's Church	Fleet Street, Castle Baynard, City of London	1670–84	Grade I (1950)	rededicated in 1957	51°30′50″N 0°6′21″W
	St Lawrence Jewry	Gresham Street, Cheap, City of London	1670–86	Grade I (1950)	restored in 1957	51.5152°N 0.0925°W
	St Mary-le-Bow	Cheapside, Cordwainer, City of London	1670–83	Grade I (1950)	reconsecrated in 1964	51°30′50″N 0°05′37″W
	St Michael Paternoster Royal	College Hill, Dowgate, City of London	1686–94	Grade I (1950)	restored in 1966–8	51°30′40.22″N 0°5′31.76″W
	St Nicholas Cole Abbey	Queen Victoria Street, Bread Street Ward, City of London	1671–81	Grade I (1950)	reconsecrated in 1962	51°30′43″N 0°5′48″W
	St Vedast Foster Lane	Foster Lane, Cheap, City of London	1670–97	Grade I (1950)	restored by 1962	51°30′53.56″N 0°5′46.08″W

=== Tower remaining ===
These churches were destroyed in the Blitz or demolished in the 19th century. Only their towers remained with perhaps a short section of the outer wall. They are no longer working churches.

Image	Name	Location	Date	Listing	Comment	Coordinates
	St Mary Somerset	Upper Thames Street, Queenhithe, City of London	1686–94	Grade I (1950)	Body of the church demolished in 1871. Tower surrounded by small garden	51°30′40.92″N 0°5′48.80″W
	St Olave Old Jewry	Ironmonger Lane, Walbrook, City of London	1670–79	Grade I (1950)	Body of the church was demolished in 1887. Tower is part of an office building.	51°30′52.15″N 0°5′28.70″W
	Christ Church Greyfriars	Newgate Street, Farringdon Within, City of London	1677–91	Grade I (1950)	Destroyed in the Blitz. The ruins are a public garden, the tower is private residence	51°30′56.94″N 0°5′56.93″W
	St Alban's, Wood Street	Wood Street, Bassishaw, City of London	1682–87	Grade II (1950)	Destroyed in the Blitz. The tower is private dwelling	51°30′59.69″N 0°5′38.95″W
	St Augustine Watling Street	Watling Street, Bread Street Ward, City of London	1680–87	Grade I (1950)	Destroyed in the Blitz. Tower part of St Paul's Cathedral Choir School	51°30′48.52″N 00°05′49.00″W
	St Dunstan-in-the-East	St Dunstan's Hill, Billingsgate, City of London	1698	Grade I (1950)	Rebuilt in 1817–21, but destroyed in the Blitz. Ruins are a public garden	51°30′34.82″N 0°4′57.80″W

=== Stones re-used ===
Image	Name	Location	Date	Listing	Comment	Coordinates
	All Hallows Lombard Street	Lombard Street, Langbourn, City of London	1686–94	never listed	Demolished in 1939, with the tower and interior fittings moved to All Hallows Twickenham	51°30′39.09″N 0°5′5.84″W
	St Mary Aldermanbury	Aldermanbury, Bassishaw, City of London	1670–74	Grade II (1972)	Ruined in 1940, and the stones transported to Fulton, Missouri in 1964. Rebuilt as a memorial to Sir Winston Churchill	51°30′59.34″N 0°5′35.06″W

=== Demolished due to the Union of Benefices Act (chronological order) ===
The population of the City of London declined sharply in the 19th century, and the Union of Benefices Act 1860 reduced the number of parish churches. The surplus churches were demolished.

Image	Name	Location	Date	Comment	Coordinates
	St Benet Gracechurch	Gracechurch Street, Bridge, City of London	1681–87	demolished in 1868	51°30′42″N 0°5′6″W
	St Mildred, Poultry	Poultry, Walbrook, City of London	1670–77	demolished in 1872	51°30′49″N 0°5′24″W
	St Antholin, Budge Row	Watling Street, Cordwainer, City of London	1678–84	demolished in 1875	51°30′45″N 0°05′31″W
	St Michael Queenhithe	Upper Thames Street, Queenhithe, City of London	1676–86	demolished in 1876	51°30′40″N 0°5′42″W
	All Hallows Bread Street	Bread Street, Cordwainer, City of London	1681–98	demolished in 1878	51.5131°N 0.0951°W
	St Dionis Backchurch	Fenchurch Street, Langbourn, City of London	1670–77	demolished in 1878	51°30′43″N 0°5′2″W
	St Matthew Friday Street	Friday Street, Bread Street Ward, City of London	1682–85	demolished in 1885	51°30′49″N 0°5′44″W
	St Mary Magdalen Old Fish Street	Old Change, Bread Street, City of London	1683–87	demolished in 1893	51°30′45″N 0°5′51″W
	All-Hallows-the-Great	Upper Thames Street, Dowgate, City of London	1677–84	demolished in 1894	51.5100°N 0.0902°W
	St Michael Wood Street	Wood Street, Cripplegate, City of London	1670–75	demolished in 1897	51°30′56″N 0°5′41.5″W

=== Demolished for other reasons (chronological order) ===
Image	Name	Location	Date	Demolition	Reason	Coordinates
	St Christopher le Stocks	Threadneedle Street, Walbrook, City of London	1670–71	demolished in 1782	to provide space for the extension of the Bank of England	51.5141°N 0.0886°W
	St Michael, Crooked Lane	Miles's Lane, Candlewick, City of London	1687	demolished in 1831	wider approaches were needed for the rebuilt London Bridge	51.51070°N 0.087280°W
	St Bartholomew-by-the-Exchange	Bartholomew Lane, Walbrook, City of London	1675–83	demolished in 1840	to provide space for the widening of Threadneedle Street	51.51376°N 0.0873°W
	St Benet Fink	Threadneedle Street, Cornhill, City of London	1670–75	demolished between 1841 and 1846	to improve the site of the Royal Exchange	51°30′50″N 0°5′10″W
	St Michael Bassishaw	Basinghall Street, Bassishaw, City of London	1675–79	demolished in 1900	judged structurally unsafe in 1892	51°31′0.1″N 0°5′30″W
	St George Botolph Lane	Botolph Lane, Bridge, City of London	1671–76	demolished in 1904	judged structurally unsafe and closed 1901	51°30′38″N 0°5′7″W

=== Destroyed in the Blitz ===
These churches were destroyed in the Blitz and their ruins demolished afterwards.

Image	Name	Location	Date	Demolition	Coordinates
	St Stephen Coleman Street	Coleman Street, Coleman Street Ward, City of London	1677	1940	51.5155°N 0.0904°W
	St Mildred, Bread Street	Bread Street, Vintry, City of London	1677–83	1941	51.5123°N 0.0952°W
	St Swithin, London Stone	Cannon Street, Walbrook, City of London	1678	1962	51°30′42″N 0°5′22″W

=== Interior refurbished by Christopher Wren ===
Image	Name	Location	Date	Listing	Comment	Coordinates
	Temple Church	Fleet Street, Farringdon Without, City of London	1682–83	Grade I (1950)	During the restoration after the Blitz Wren's wooden altar was discovered in a museum and was restored to its original position	51°30′47.52″N 0°06′37.44″W

== Churches built outside the City of London ==
These churches were outside the area of the Great Fire of London.

Image	Name	Location	Date	Listing	Comment	Coordinates
	St Anne's Church, Soho	Dean Street, Soho, City of Westminster	1677–85	Grade II (1958)	The body of the church by Wren and William Talman was destroyed in the Blitz and later totally demolished; the preserved tower was built by S. P. Cockerell in 1801–03	51.5124°N 0.1323°W
	St Clement Danes	Strand, City of Westminster	1680–82	Grade I (1958)	Destroyed in 1941; reconsecrated in 1958 after the Blitz.	51.513107°N 0.113898°W
	St James's Church, Piccadilly	Piccadilly, St James's, City of Westminster	1676–84	Grade I (1958)	Destroyed in 1940; restored in 1947–54 after the Blitz	51°30′31″N 0°8′12″W
	Chapel of the Royal Hospital Chelsea	Royal Hospital Road, Chelsea, Royal Borough of Kensington and Chelsea	1682–87	Grade I (1969)	Wren designed the rest of the hospital, as well.	51°29′11″N 0°9′28″W

== See also ==
- List of demolished churches in the City of London

== Bibliography ==
- Betjeman, John (1992) [1967], Sovereign City of London Churches, Andover: Pitkin, ISBN 978-0-85372-565-7
- Godwin, George (1839), Churches of London, Vols.1–2, C. Tilt
- Huelin, G (1996), Vanished Churches of the City of London, London: Guildhall Library Publications, ISBN 978-0-900422-42-3
- Reynolds, H (1922), The Churches of the City of London, London: The Bodley Head Limited
