= City of London ward clubs =

English civil society organisations

City of London ward clubs are civil society organisations based in the wards of the City of London. Every ward has such a club.

== Contemporary Ward Club ==
The United Wards Club was founded in 1877 by Joseph Newbon.

Ward	Founded	Associate of United Wards’ Club	website
Aldersgate	1860	No	Aldersgate Ward Club
Aldgate	1906	Yes	Aldgate Ward Club
Bassishaw	1903	Yes	Bassishaw Ward Club
Billingsgate	1928	Yes	Billingsgate Ward Club
Bishopsgate	1790/1860	Yes	Bishopsgate Ward Club
Bread Street	Reformed 1967	No	Bread Street Ward Club
Bridge	1930	Yes	Bridge Ward Club
Broad Street	1893	Yes	Broad Street Ward Club
Candlewick	1739	Yes	Candlewick Ward Club
Castle Baynard	1909	Yes	Castle Baynard Ward Club
Cheap	1863	Yes	Ward of Cheap Club
Coleman Street	1862	Yes	Coleman Street Ward Club
Cordwainer	1902	Yes	Cordwainer Ward Club
Cornhill			See Lime Street Ward Club
Cripplegate	1878	Yes	Cripplegate Ward Club
Dowgate			See Vintry
Farringdon Within		no	
Farringdon Without		no	
Langbourn	1890	No	Langbourn Ward Club
Lime Street	1946	No	Lime Street Ward Club
Portsoken	1924	No	Portsoken Ward Club
Queenhithe	1932	No	Queenhithe Ward Club
Tower	1971	Yes	Tower Ward Club
Vintry		No	Vintry and Dowgate Ward Club
Walbrook	1806	No	
