= Bridge Without =

Ward of the City of London, 1550–1899

Bridge Without was a historical ward of the City of London situated to the south of the River Thames, which existed between 1550 and 1899. The area of the Bridge Without ward today forms part of the London Borough of Southwark. It was so-called to distinguish it from the ward of Bridge Within which covered the buildings on London Bridge and the nearby north bank of the Thames (within the walls of the City of London). Bridge Within since 1978 is formally called Bridge and Bridge Without.

== History ==
In 1550 the new ward of Bridge Without was created to cover the City's area of control in Southwark (the three manors of the Guildable Manor, King's Manor and Great Liberty), the Court of Aldermen appointing its alderman; there were never any members of the Court of Common Council elected there as the three Courts Leet of the Manors fulfilled that representative role. The existing ward on the bridge and just to the north became Bridge Within.

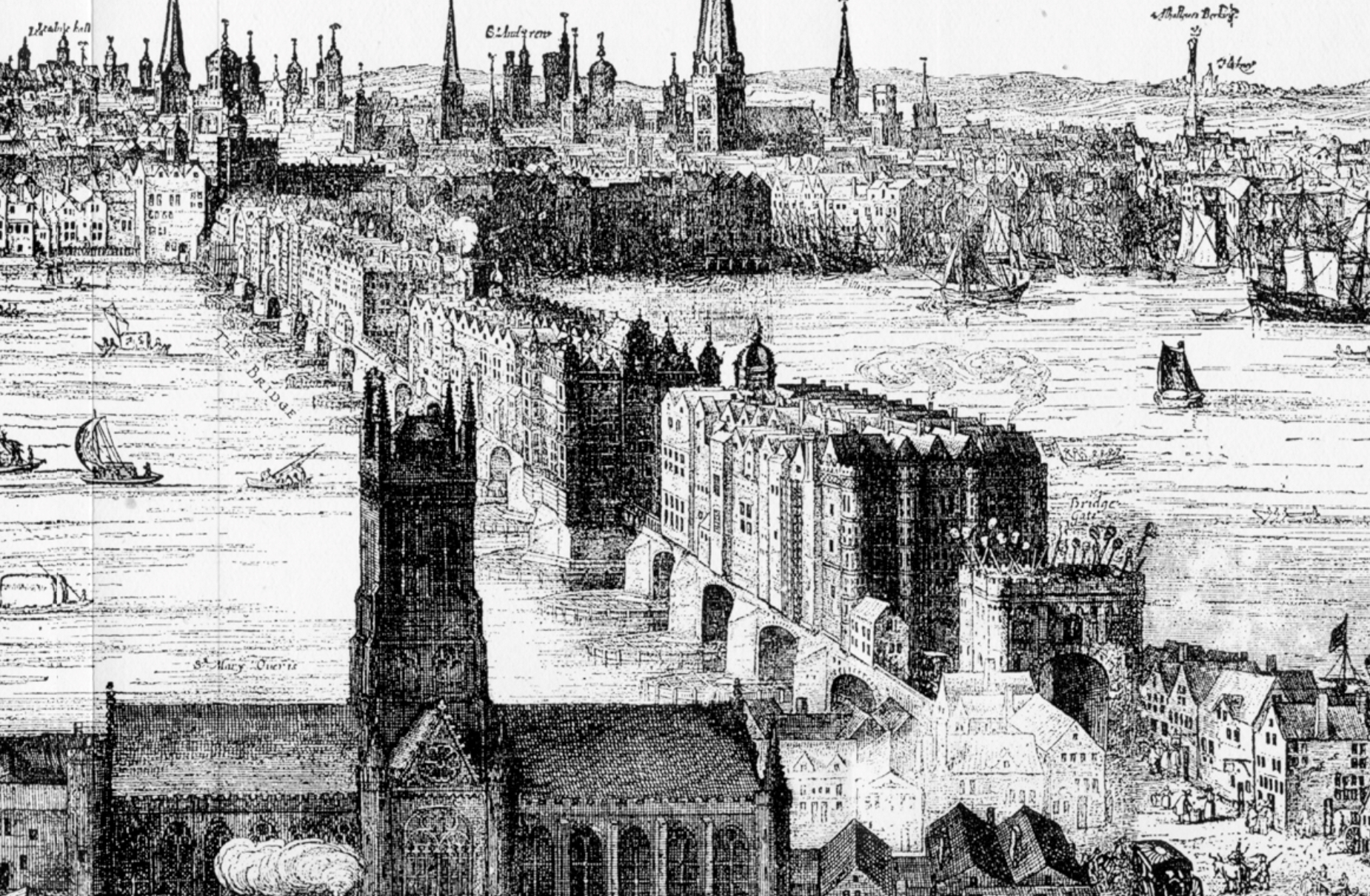
London Bridge viewed from Southwark and Saint Mary Overie. The Great Stone Gateway at the very southern end of the bridge formed the boundary between Within and Without.

However, the City's administrative responsibility for the Without ward had in practice disappeared by the mid-Victorian era as various aspects of metropolitan government were extended into the neighbouring areas.

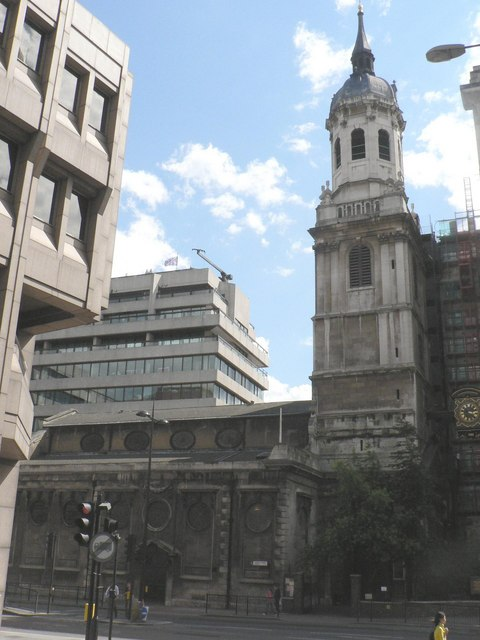
St. Magnus-the-Martyr church.

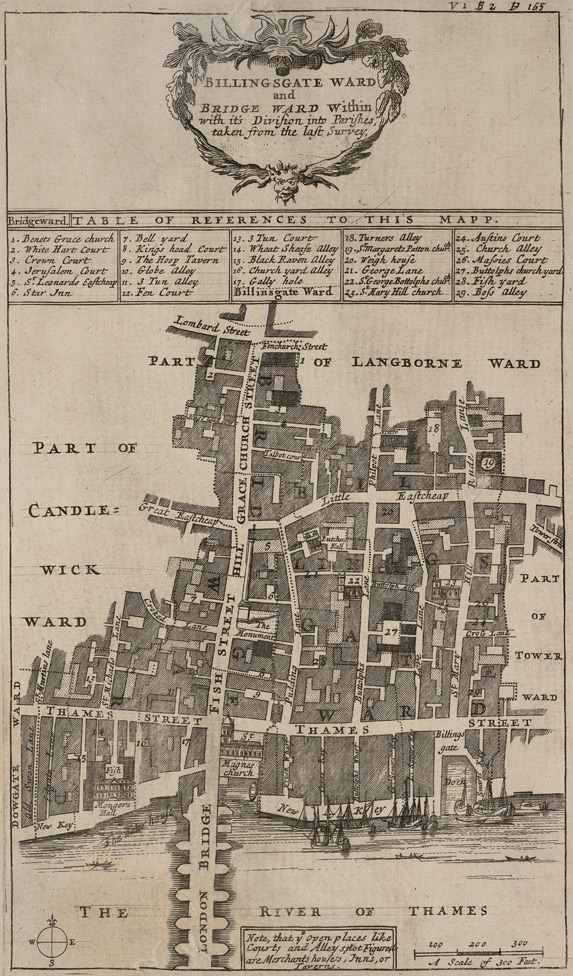
A 1720 map showing the wards of Bridge Within and neighbouring Billingsgate.

Despite the fact that the area of Bridge Without had been removed completely from the City's boundaries in 1899, the ward continued to de jure exist and the Court of Aldermen continued to appoint an alderman for the ward by co-option, usually the senior emeritus lord mayor (or father of the City) until as late as 1978 — Bridge Without was then merged with Bridge Within, to become the present-day Bridge ward. This is, in a sense, a return to the situation prior to 1550. However the ward is still officially referred to as "Bridge and Bridge Without" as a result of the 1978 amalgamation. This had no practical effect in terms of representation on the Court of Common Council because Without had never had Councilmen.

"Without" and "Within" denote whether a ward, or a division of one, fell outside or within the London Wall — this is still the case for the wards of Farringdon Within and Farringdon Without — though in this instance Bridge Without fell beyond the fortified gate leading to London Bridge, rather than London Wall itself. The full span of London Bridge was for many centuries lined with buildings, including many houses, and they formed part of the ward of Bridge Within. Indeed, so numerous were the dwellings on the bridge that at one time it constituted three of the 14 precincts (a former sub-division of the wards) of Bridge Within.

== Relationship with Southwark ==
Southwark was outside of the control of the City of London and was a haven for criminals and free traders, who would sell goods and conduct trades outside the regulation of the City livery companies. In 1327 the City obtained control from Edward III, of the manor next to the south-side of London Bridge 'the town of Southwark' (called latterly 'Guildable Manor', i.e. the place of taxes and tolls). The livery companies also ensured that they had jurisdiction over the area.

From the Norman period manorial organisation obtained through major lay and ecclesiastic magnates. Southwark still has vestiges of this because of the connection with the City of London. In 1327 the City acquired from Edward III the original 'vill of Southwark' and this was also described as "the borough". In 1536 Henry VIII acquired the Bermondsey Priory properties and in 1538 that of the Archbishop. In 1550 these were sold to the City.

After many decades of petitioning, in 1550 Southwark was incorporated into the City of London as 'The Ward of Bridge Without'. However, the alderman was appointed by the Court of Aldermen and no Common Councilmen were ever elected. This 'ward' was constituted of the original 'Guildable Manor' and the properties previously held by the church, under a charter of Edward VI, latterly called the 'King's Manor' and 'Great Liberty' manor. These manors are still constituted by the City under a bailiff and steward with their courts leet and View of Frankpledge juries and officers which still meet – their annual assembly being held in November under the present High Steward (the Recorder of London). The ward and aldermanry were effectively abolished in 1978, by merging it with the Ward of Bridge (Within). These manorial courts were preserved under the Administration of Justice Act 1977. Therefore, between 1750 and 1978 Southwark had two persons (the alderman and the recorder) who were members of the City's Court of Aldermen and Common Council who were elected neither by the City freemen or by the Southwark electorate but appointed by the Court of Aldermen.
