= Baynard =

Baynard may refer to:

== Places ==
- Baynard House, London
- Baynard's Castle
- Castle Baynard

== People ==
- Ann Baynard (1672–1697), British philosopher
- Edward Baynard (disambiguation), several people
- Emerson Baynard (died 1997), American basketball player
- Fulk Baynard (fl. 1226), English landowner and judge
- Richard Baynard (c. 1371–1434), English politician
