= Wards of London =

Wards of London may refer to:

- Wards of the City of London
- List of electoral wards in Greater London
