= Local government area =

Administrative division of a country that a local government is responsible for

A local government area (LGA) is an administrative division of a country that a local government is responsible for. The size of an LGA varies by country but it is generally a subdivision of a division, province, state, or territory.

== Australia ==
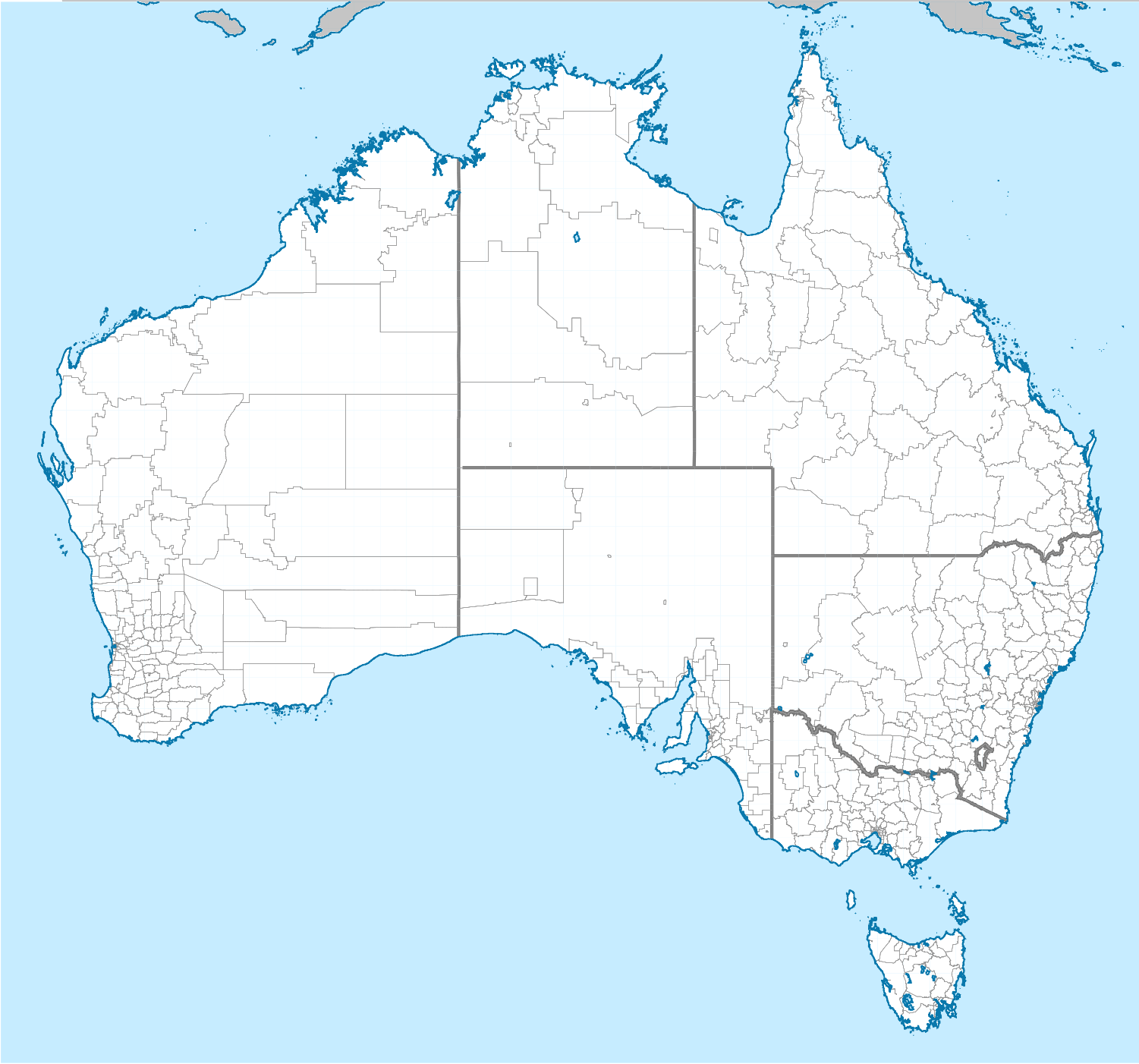
Map of Australian local government areas

The term is particularly common in Australia where it provides a general term for shires, municipalities, or cities. Local government authorities across the country have similar functions and powers, but have different official designations in different states, and according to whether they are urban or rural. Most urban LGAs in all states are "cities". Many in Western Australia are officially "towns", even within the Perth metropolitan area. Many rural areas in Queensland, New South Wales, Victoria and Western Australia are "shires", while rural areas in South Australia have "district councils", and those in Tasmania officially use the title "municipality". Due to the Australian Capital Territory's small size it has no local government and is instead overseen by the ACT Legislative Assembly.

Australian LGA status by state/territory
State/territory	LGA status
New South Wales	Cities; Shires
Northern Territory	Cities; Towns; Municipalities; Shires
Queensland	Cities; Shires; Towns; Regional councils
South Australia	Cities; Rural cities Municipalities/municipal councils District councils Regional councils Towns; Aboriginal councils
Tasmania	Cities; Municipalities
Victoria	Cities; Rural cities Boroughs; Shires
Western Australia	Cities; Towns; Shires

It is largely for this reason that the term "local government area", or simply "LGA", is favoured over the term "municipality", the use of which could easily lead to confusion. In recent years changes to the structures of local government have given rise to new official designations, while other terms have fallen out of favour. In the mid-1990s the state government of Victoria amalgamated almost all municipalities, abolishing many cities and shires, all towns and all but one borough. Queenscliff, south of Melbourne, is now the only place in Australia that is officially a borough. Meanwhile, many "rural cities" were formed in largely rural areas where the core town is large enough, in terms of population, to be considered a city. In many such cases that town had previously been governed by a now defunct city council. Restructuring of local government in New South Wales and Queensland in the following decade gave rise to the municipal designations of "region" and "area", for example, the Sunshine Coast of Queensland was formerly divided into several shires, but is now governed by a single Sunshine Coast Regional Council.

The least densely populated areas of Australia's largest states have no local government, and are referred to as unincorporated areas.

== The Gambia ==
"Local government area" is an official designation for eight administrative subdivisions of the Gambia.

== Nigeria ==
"Local government area" is also an official designation in Nigeria.

== United Kingdom ==
The phrase is used as a generalised description in the United Kingdom to refer to a variety of political divisions such as boroughs, counties, unitary authorities, and cities, all of which have a council or similar body exercising a degree of self-government. Each of the United Kingdom's four constituent countries has its own structure of local government, for example Northern Ireland has local districts; many parts of England have non-metropolitan counties consisting of rural districts; London and many other urban areas have boroughs; there are three island councils off the coast of Scotland; while the rest of Scotland and all of Wales are divided into unitary authority counties, some of which are officially designated as cities. As such the term local government area is a convenient generic label referring to all of these authorities and the areas within their control.

== See also ==
- Municipal corporation
- Municipal council
- Shire
- Town council
