= Edward Baynard =

Edward Baynard may refer to:

- Edward Baynard (sheriff) (c. 1512–1575), English politician
- Edward Baynard (physician) (1641–?), English physician and poet

== See also ==
- Baynard
