= Subdivisions of Tanzania =

Type of administrative territorial entity of a single country

- Location: Tanzania
- Subdivisions: Region (31); District (169); Division; Ward (Urban) > Street; Ward (Rural) > Village > Hamlet

The administrative divisions of Tanzania are controlled by Part I, Article 2.2 of the Constitution of Tanzania. Tanzania is divided into thirty-one regions (mkoa in Swahili). Each region is subdivided into districts (wilaya in Swahili). The districts are sub-divided into divisions (tarafa in Swahili) and further into local wards (kata in Swahili). Wards are further subdivided for management purposes: for urban wards into streets (mtaa in Swahili) and for rural wards into villages (kijiji in Swahili). The villages may be further subdivided into hamlets (kitongoji in Swahili).

== Regions ==
In 1922 under the British Tanganyika was divided into twenty-two regions, known as "divisions": Arusha, Bagamoyo, Bukoba, Dar es Salaam, Dodoma, Iringa, Kilwa, Kondoa-Irangi, Lindi, Mahenge, Morogoro, Moshi, Mwanza, Pangani, Rufiji, Rungwe, Songea, Tabora, Tanga, Ufipa, Ujiji, and Usambara.

== Districts ==
According to the 2012 Tanzania National Census, Tanzania was divided into 169 districts. There is one type of rural district: a District Council. And there are three types of urban districts: Town Council, Municipal Council and City Council.

== Divisions ==
A division is an administrative organization for several wards.

== Wards ==
A village is the lowest government administrative structure at the community level. In an urban area, a cluster (mtaa) can include a number of streets. A ward (kata) is an administrative structure for one single town or portion of a bigger town (Urban Wards). Rural wards are composed of several villages
