= Castle Baynard =

Ward of the City of London

Coordinates: 51.51307°N 0.10471°W

- Ward
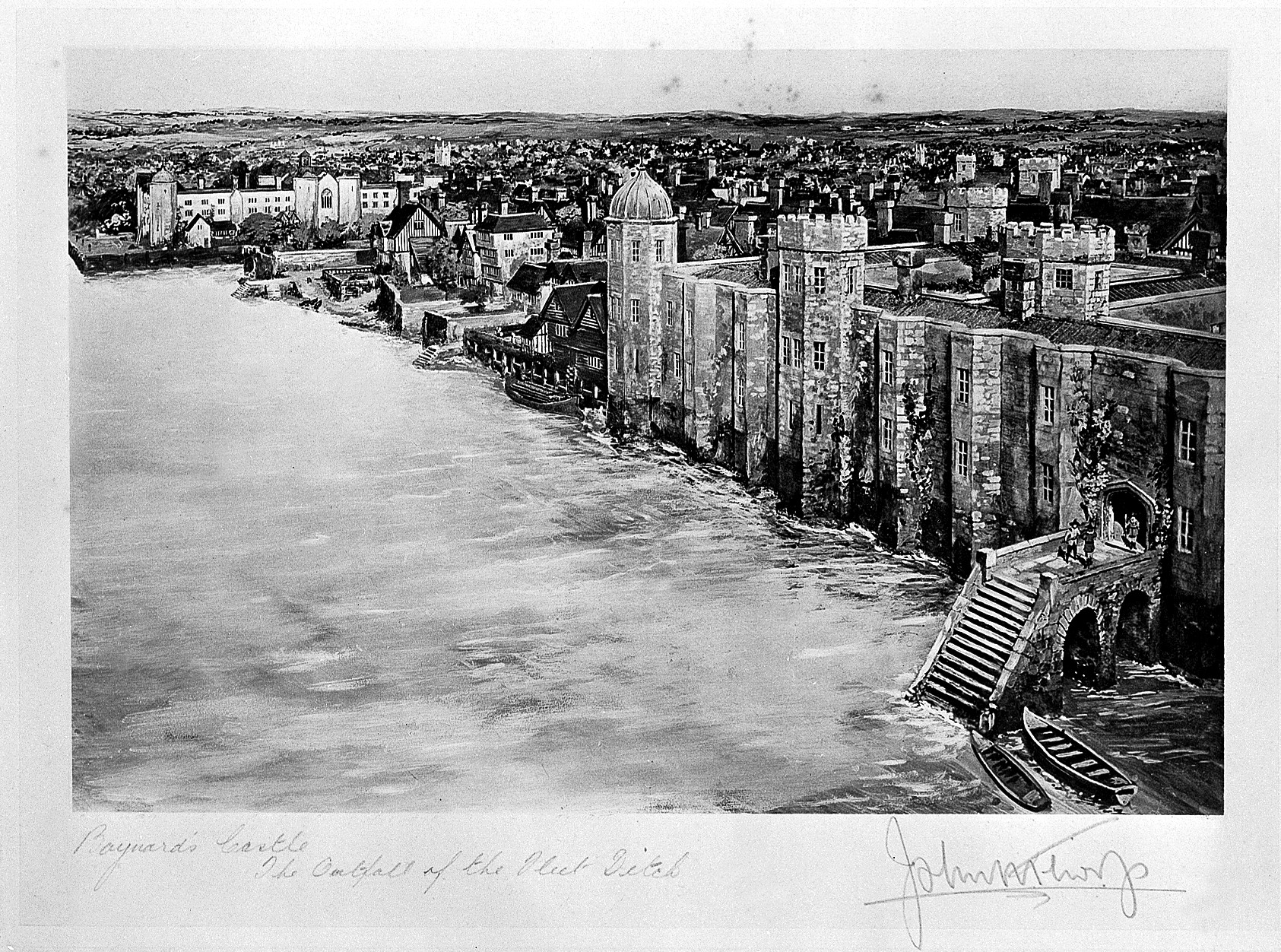
- The ward took its name from Baynard’s Castle

- Location within Greater London
- Castle Baynard ward boundaries since 2013
- OS grid reference: TQ315811
- Sui generis: City of London
- Administrative area: Greater London
- Region: London
- Country: England
- Sovereign state: United Kingdom
- Post town: LONDON
- Postcode district: EC4
- Dialling code: 020
- Police: City of London
- Fire: London
- Ambulance: London
- UK Parliament: Cities of London and Westminster
- London Assembly: City and East

Castle Baynard is one of the 25 wards of the City of London, with the City forming the historic and financial centre of Greater London, England.

== Features ==
The ward covers an irregularly shaped area, sometimes likened to a tuning fork, bounded on the east by the wards of Queenhithe and Bread Street; the ward of Farringdon Without to the north and west; the ward of Farringdon Within to the north; and by the River Thames to the south.

Major landmarks within the ward include Blackfriars Bridge (the full span of which falls within the City and this ward), the naval establishment HMS President, and St Paul's Cathedral. In addition, the area includes the churches of St Bride's, which the Poet Laureate Sir John Betjeman described as "magnificent, even by the exalted standards of Sir Christopher Wren", and St Andrew-by-the-Wardrobe. The College of Arms is also located in Castle Baynard. The historic Dr Johnson's House is in the ward as well. The ward formerly also included the Church of St Mary Magdalen Old Fish Street, which burned down in 1886 and was not rebuilt, and its own charitable foundation, Castle Baynard Ward School. Today the Mermaid Theatre, on the site of Curriers' Alley and Puddle Dock, lies within the ward's catchment area. The north-bank entrance of Blackfriars station, the only London station to span the Thames, also lies within Castle Baynard.

Boundary changes in 2003 expanded the ward considerably into the traditional area of the two Farringdon wards, though a small amount of territory was lost to Queenhithe ward. Today, Castle Baynard is busy and an exceptionally concentrated area of commercial and tourist activity, but still retains its own distinct identity.

== History ==
Castle Baynard derives its name from Baynard's Castle, which existed there from the Norman Conquest until it burnt down during the Great Fire of London in 1666. It was anciently spelled as one word — Castlebaynard — but this is regarded today as incorrect.

== Politics ==
Castle Baynard ward boundaries from 2003 to 2013

Castle Baynard is one of 25 wards in the City of London, each electing an Alderman to the Court of Aldermen and Commoners (the City equivalent of a Councillor) to the Court of Common Council of the City of London Corporation. Only electors who are Freemen of the City of London are eligible to stand.

Martha Grekos is the current Alderwoman representing the ward, and Deputy Bethany Coombs, Tana Adkin KC, Susan Farrington, Josephine Hayes, Helen Ladele, Vasiliki Manta, Leyla Ostovar and Stephanie Steeden are the Common Councilwomen.

In October 2018, the Labour Party won its sixth seat on the Common Council in Castle Baynard when the local resident Natasha Lloyd-Owen (now Cripplegate) topped the polls for Labour in an unexpected by-election victory. Labour had previously won a record total of five seats on the Common Council in March 2017 winning two seats in Portsoken, two seats in Cripplegate ward and one seat in Aldersgate ward.
