= Edward Baynard (physician) =

English physician and poet

Edward Baynard (born c. 1641, fl. 1719), was an English physician and poet.

Baynard was probably born at Preston, Lancashire. In 1665, at the time of the great plague, he was sometimes at Chiswick and sometimes in London. He entered the university of Leyden to study medicine in 1671 and most likely graduated there. He became an honorary fellow of the College of Physicians of London in 1684, and a fellow in 1687. Before this, he had commenced practice at Preston. From about the year 1675, for twenty-six years, it was his custom to visit the hot baths at Bath. He was established there as a physician, as well as in London, his home, his address in 1701 being the Old House, Ludgate Hill. Baynard is said to have been the 'Horoscope' of Garth's Dispensary.

Sir John Floyer's treatise on cold bathing, entitled The ancient Psychrolousia revived (1702), has appended to it a letter from Baynard "containing an Account of many Eminent Cures done by the Cold Baths in England; together with a Short Discourse of the wonderful Virtues of the Bath Waters on decayed Stomachs, drank Hot from the Pump." Baynard's popular work entitled Health, a Poem. Shewing how to procure, preserve, and restore it. To which is annex'd The Doctor's Decade, was published at London in 1719, 8vo. The fourth edition appeared in 1731; the fifth, corrected, in 1736; the seventh in 1742; the eighth without date; and the ninth at Manchester in 1758. Another edition, also called the ninth, was published at London in 1764. The preface, partly in verse and partly in prose, is mainly directed against drunkenness; and the poem itself is made up of homely medical advice. Baynard has two papers in the Philosophical Transactions, one of them being on the "Case of a Child who swallowed two Copper Farthings."

His only daughter was Ann Baynard.
