= Farringdon, London =

Coordinates: 51.520905°N 0.103675°W

Farringdon
- Location within Greater London
- OS grid reference: TQ315818
- London borough: Islington
- Ceremonial county: Greater London
- Region: London
- Country: England
- Sovereign state: United Kingdom
- Post town: LONDON
- Postcode district: EC1
- Dialling code: 020
- Police: Metropolitan
- Fire: London
- Ambulance: London
- UK Parliament: Islington South and Finsbury
- London Assembly: North East

Farringdon (/ˈfærɪŋdən/) is an area in the London Borough of Islington, situated immediately north of its border with the City of London. The term is used to describe the area around Farringdon station.

Historically the district corresponded to southern Clerkenwell and the small parish of St Sepulchre Middlesex. The area's name is a back-formation: It takes its name from the station, which was in turn named after Farringdon Street.

To the south lie the City of London wards of Farringdon Within and Farringdon Without. The City Wards, which were once a single unit, are unconnected to the distinct area of Farringdon to their north, though there is an etymological connection.

== History ==
=== Toponymy ===
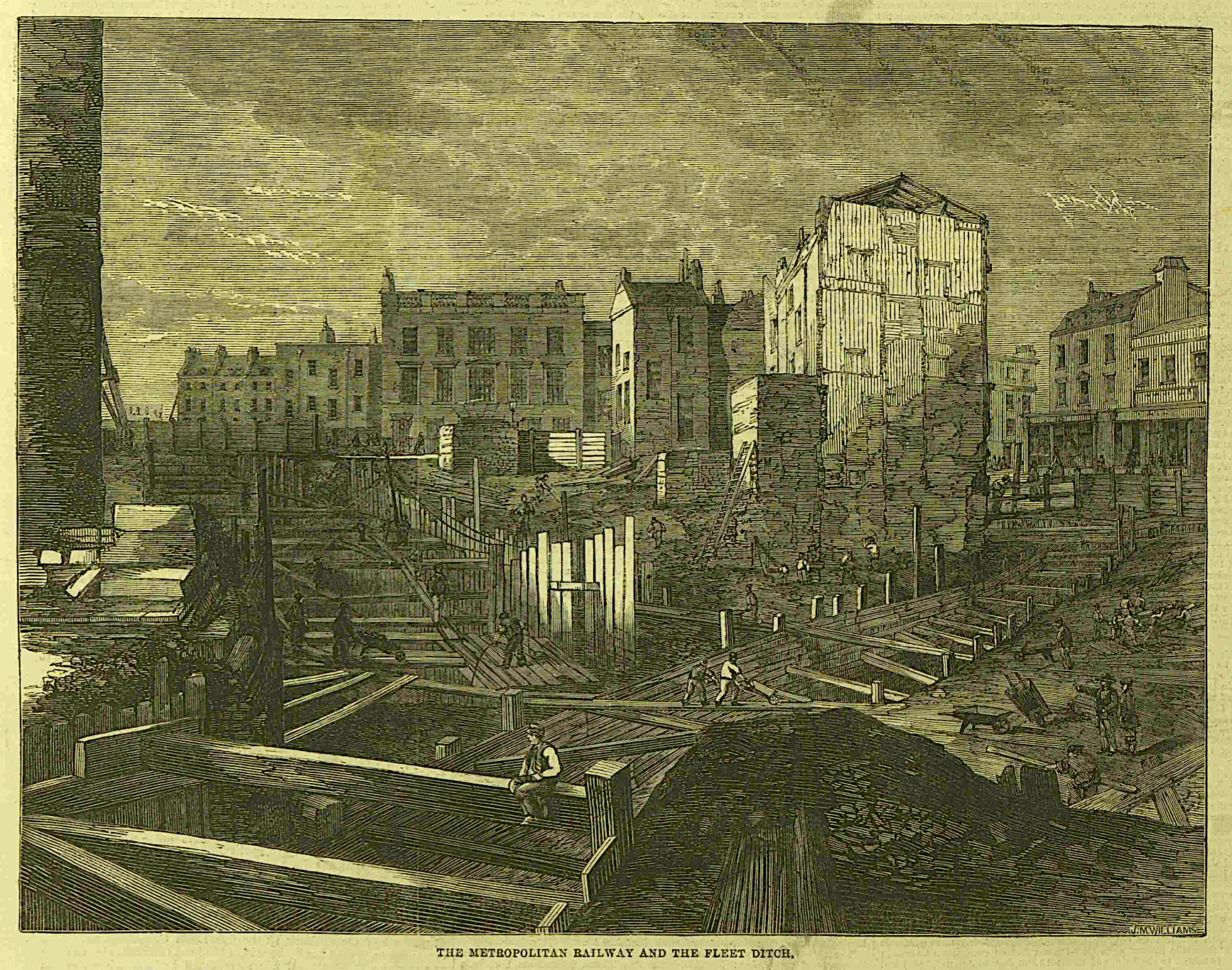
The Metropolitan Railway and the Fleet Ditch: February 1862

There are numerous places in England called Farringdon; all meaning fern covered hill. William and Nicholas de Faringdon, whose name is likely to have originated from one of these places, were two related prominent citizens and Aldermen in the early 13th century. Nicholas purchased the area of the Farringdon ward of the City of London in 1279 and became its Alderman in 1281. In 1394 the ward was split into the still extant Farringdon Within and Farringdon Without.

Farringdon Street was built by covering part of the River Fleet in the Farringdon Without Ward of the city. The street was named after either the Ward or after the Nicholas de Faringdon. Farringdon Road was an extension of Farringdon Street, also built over the River Fleet, but lying northward, beyond the city.

Farringdon Station was built close to Farringdon Road, and originally named Farringdon Street Station. The presence of the railway station has led to the surrounding areas of southern Clerkenwell being referred to as Farringdon.

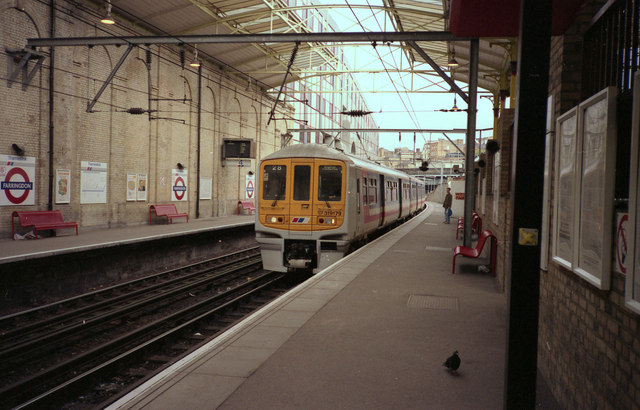
Farringdon station under British Rail with a Network SouthEast livery British Rail Class 319 on a Thameslink service

=== Administration ===
Farringdon station and its environs historically corresponded to southern Clerkenwell and three much smaller areas; the parish of St Sepulchre Middlesex, Charterhouse and Glasshouse Yard.

When the Metropolitan Borough of Finsbury was formed in 1900, Clerkenwell and the other areas were absorbed into the new borough. In 1965 the Metropolitan Borough of Finsbury became part of the new London Borough of Islington.

=== Street name etymologies ===
- Albion Place – thought to be simply a suitably patriotic name; formerly George Court
- Aldersgate Street – the name Aldersgate is first recorded around 1000 in the form Ealdredesgate, i.e. "gate associated with a man named Ealdrād". The gate, constructed by the Romans in the 2nd or 3rd centuries when London Wall was constructed, probably acquired its name in the late Saxon period.
- Benjamin Street – unknown; thought to probably be for a local landowner/builder
- Briset Street – after Jordan de Briset, local 12th-century landowner who gave land to the Order of St John for their headquarters here
- Britton Street – after Thomas Britton, local coal seller and prominent patron of the arts, who lived nearby in the 17th – 18th century; it was formerly known as Red Lion Street, after a local inn
- Broad Yard
- Carthusian Street – after the Carthusian monks who lived near here in the Middle Ages
- Charterhouse Buildings, Charterhouse Mews, Charterhouse Square and Charterhouse Street – Anglicisation of Chartreuse, from Grande Chartreuse, head monastery of the Carthusians in France; a nearby abbey was founded by monks of this order in 1371
- Cowcross Street – this street was path for cattle being taken to nearby Smithfield market
- Dickens Mews – presumably after Victorian author Charles Dickens
- Eagle Court – after Eagle, Lincolnshire; the Order of Knights of St John owned land in this village and the Bailiff of Eagle owned a house near here
- Farringdon Road – from Sir William or Nicholas de Farnedon/Faringdon, local sheriffs or aldermen in the 13th century
- Faulkners Alley
- Fox and Knot Street – after the Fox and Knot tavern of the 18th century
- Francis Court
- Glasshouse Yard – after a 17th-century glass factory on this site
- Goswell Road – There is dispute over the origins of the name, with some sources claiming the road was named after a nearby garden called 'Goswelle' or 'Goderell' which belonged to Robert de Ufford, 1st Earl of Suffolk, and others a well called the Gode Well whilst others state it derives from "God's Well", and the traditional pagan practice of well-worship.
- Greenhill's Rents – after John Greenhill, local 18th-century property owner
- Hat and Mitre Court – after an 18th-century tavern of this name
- Passing Alley – altered from the descriptive Pissing Alley, renamed at some point prior to the 1790s
- Peter's Lane – after the former St Peter's Key pub on this site
- Rutland Place – after the Manners family, earls of Rutland, local property owners of the 17th century
- St John's Lane, St John's Path, St John's Place, St John's Square and St John Street – after the Monastic Order of the Knights Hospitallers of St John of Jerusalem, who set up their English headquarters here in the 12th century
- Smokehouse Yard – after the bacon stoves formerly located here
- Stable Court
- Turk's Head Yard – after an 18th-century tavern of this name here
- Turnmill Street – originally 13th-century ‘Trimullstrete’ or ‘Three Mills Street’, after three mills that stood near here by the river Fleet
- White Horse Alley

== Geography ==
The station and its immediate environs are located in the southern extremity of the London Borough of Islington, adjacent to the northern boundary of the City of London and the eastern boundary of the London Borough of Camden.

=== Boundaries ===
Farringdon has no formally defined boundaries, but can be approximated as extending to Clerkenwell Road to the north, Goswell Road and Aldersgate Street to the east, Charterhouse Street, Charterhouse Square and Carthusian Street to the south and Farringdon Road to the west. Central District Alliance BID is the Business Improvement District representing Farringdon.

=== Boundary with the City ===
A map based on Stow c 1600 shows the Fagswell Brook south of Cowcross Street as the northern boundary of the city. At Long Lane, by the brook, were the now lost ornamental boundary markers known as West Smithfield Bars, first documented in 1170 and 1197.

Until 1993, a small triangle of land south of Cowcross Street was within the City of London and formed part of the Farringdon Without ward. The boundary between the City of London and the London Borough of Islington was locally realigned in 1993 with small exchanges of land between each; in this area the boundary was moved slightly south to align with Charterhouse Street.

== Transport ==
The redevelopment and expansion of Farringdon station has had a significant effect on the local area. The station is served by the Thameslink north–south rail route and since May 2022 the east–west Elizabeth line service which required the construction of additional station entrances. The Crossrail project to construct the Elizabeth line was delayed by a number of years, having been due to open in December 2018. A proposed upgrade of the Thameslink route would also affect the local area, including the construction of further station entrances, the pedestrianisation of Cowcross Street and the demolition of several buildings.
