= Wards of the City of London =

Special form of ward in the City of London

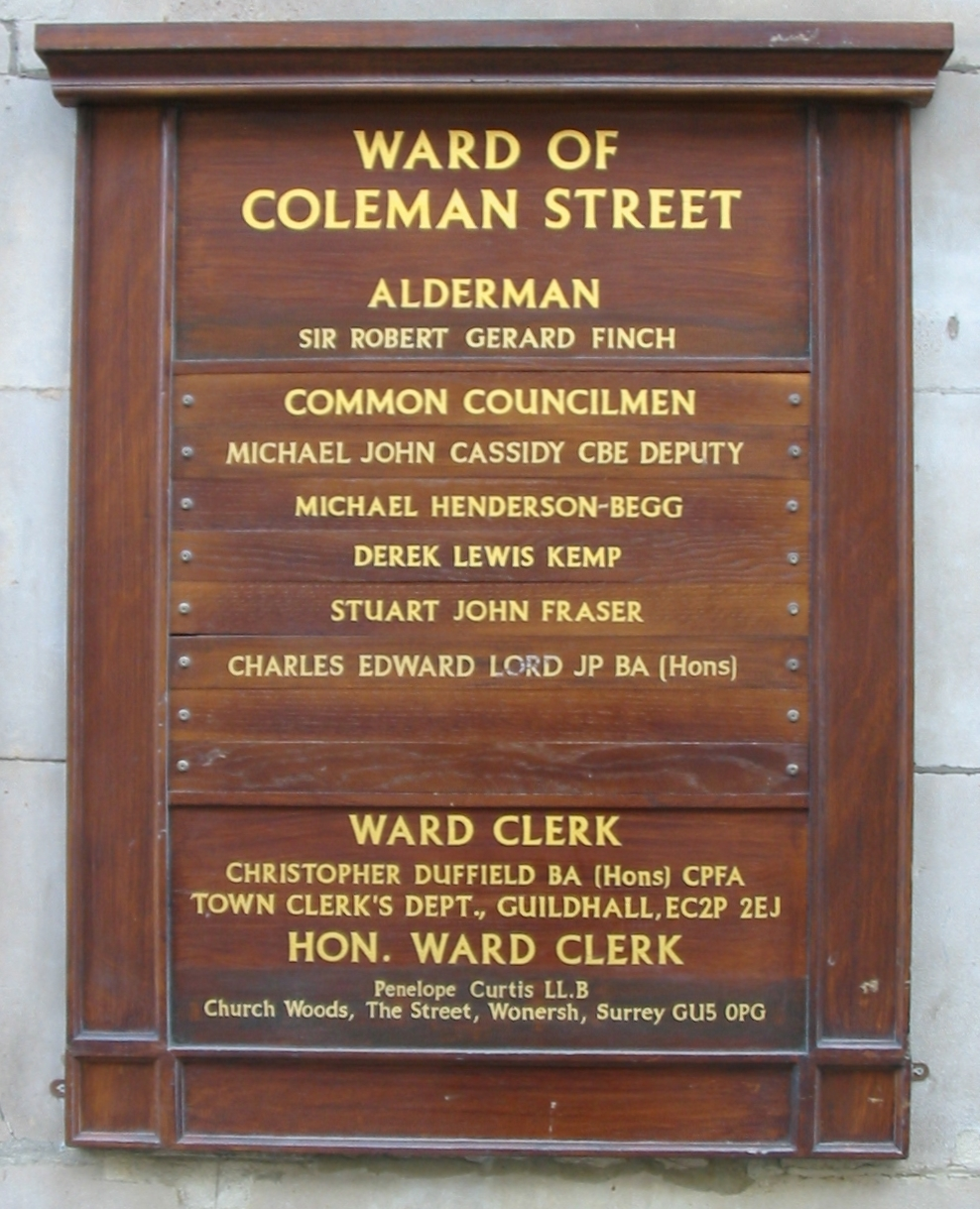
A wooden notice board (each ward has at least one) displaying the Alderman, the Common Councilmen (one of whom is the Alderman's Deputy), and the clerks of that ward.

The City of London (also known simply as "the City") is divided into 25 wards. The City is the historic core of the much wider metropolis of Greater London, with an ancient and sui generis form of local government, which avoided the many local government reforms elsewhere in the country in the 19th and 20th centuries. Unlike other modern English local authorities, the City of London Corporation has two council bodies: the now largely ceremonial Court of Aldermen, and the Court of Common Council.

The wards are a survival of the medieval governmental system that allowed very small areas to exist as self-governing units within the wider city. They are both electoral/political sub-divisions and permanent ceremonial, geographic and administrative entities within the city. They had their boundaries changed in 2003, and to a lesser extent in 2013, though the number of wards and their names did not change.

== Aspects of the ward system ==
=== Aldermanries ===
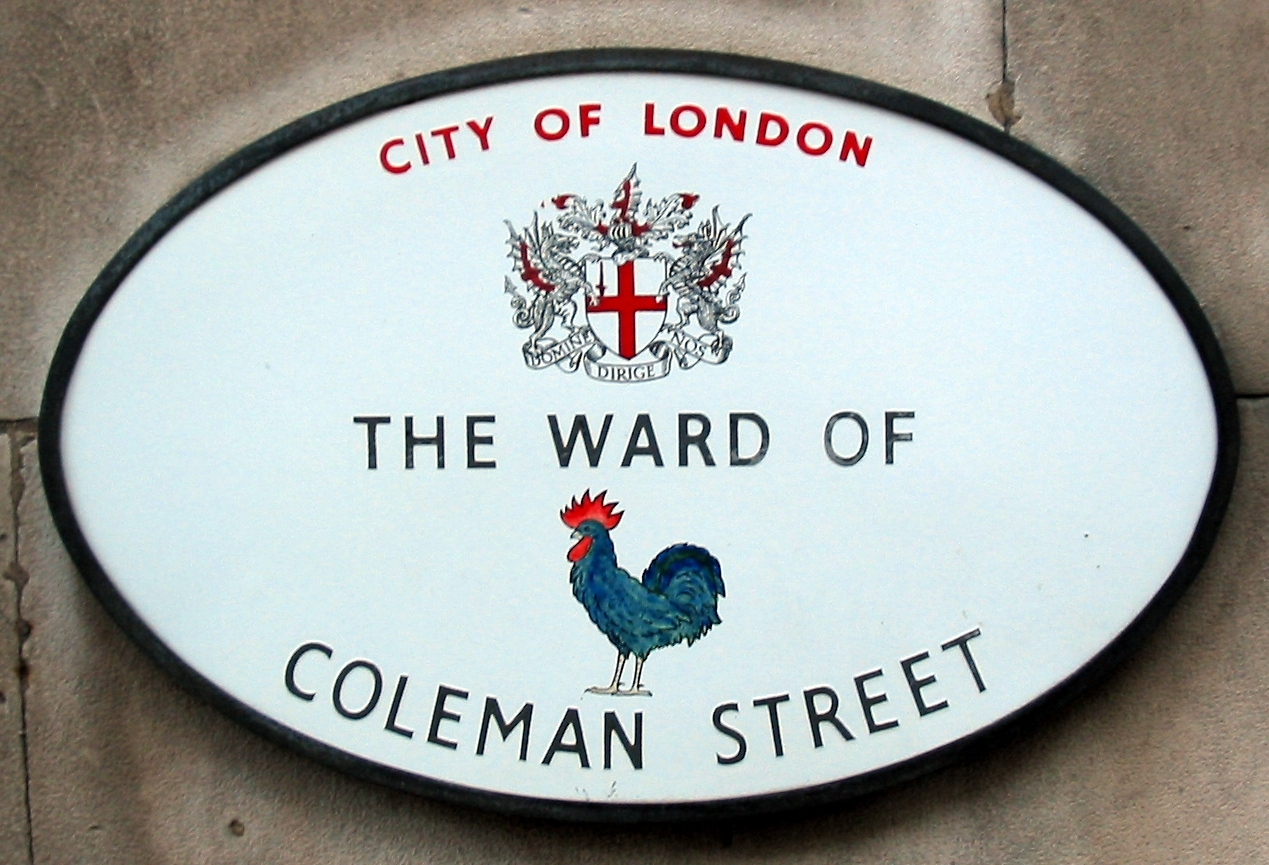
In some places in the city, a plaque will state the local ward's name.

Each ward, or aldermanry, has its own alderman, who is the most senior official or representative in the ward. The aldermen traditionally held office for life but in the modern era put themselves up for re-election at least every six years. They also now customarily retire at 70, the same retirement age as a justice of the peace. Each ward (irrespective of its size) returns one alderman to the Court of Aldermen. One of the aldermen is elected (by the senior liverymen) as Lord Mayor of London for a period of one year.

The Lord Mayor performs many functions and holds many ancient positions and privileges. The Lord Mayor continues to be the alderman of their ward during and after their term of office, though there is a period of purdah whilst in (and for a period after) office, and during this period their appointed deputy will usually take their role within the ward. The City of London is the only remaining local authority in Great Britain to have (non-honorary) aldermen, since their general abolition in England and Wales in 1974 and the London boroughs in 1978.

=== Wardmotes, Ward Beadles and Ward Clerks ===
Wards continue to have beadles, with most having just one, but the larger wards two or three. This is an ancient elected office that is now largely ceremonial, in that they accompany their alderman on the eight high ceremonial occasions in the city's civic calendar and in attending to call to order the wardmote, an annual meeting in each ward of electors, representatives and officials. These should not be confused with the beadles of the livery companies of the city, who are employees of them.

The ward's alderman presides over the wardmote and appoints one of the common councillors of the ward as a deputy (in some wards two are appointed) for the year ahead. Wardmotes at which an alderman is to be elected are presided over by the Lord Mayor. There are also ward clubs, which are similar to residents' associations found elsewhere in the country, but because these have membership open to those without an electoral qualification in the ward they have essentially become social clubs as part of the city's general civic social life along with the guilds, associations and liveries. There are twenty-two of these (Farringdon has always been an association of both wards of that name and Vintry and Dowgate the result of merger of the two clubs of each ward in 1957). Confusingly, there is also a 'United Wards Club' which was formed before many of the others as a joint association and is now additional to them.

In recent times, the ward clerk is a permanent position held by an official at the corporation, and based at the Guildhall, though wards can appoint (usually at the wardmote) an honorary ward clerk in addition. The ward clerk is a separate office to that of the Town Clerk of London, who is the chief executive of the corporation.

=== Association ===
Particular churches, livery halls and other historic buildings, structures and institutions are associated with specific wards, such as St Paul's Cathedral with Castle Baynard ward, Vintners' Hall with Vintry ward, the insurance markets (especially Lloyd's) with Lime Street ward, and London Bridge with Bridge ward. Boundary changes in 2003 removed some of these connected places from their wards, but that boundary review and the 2013 review did take into account of these historic/traditional connections.

=== City police ===
The City of London Police use the wards in their day-to-day neighbourhood policing, as well as in recording crime and other statistics, with each ward having a constable assigned, known as the Ward Constable, with the larger wards having Assistant Ward Constables in addition.

== History ==
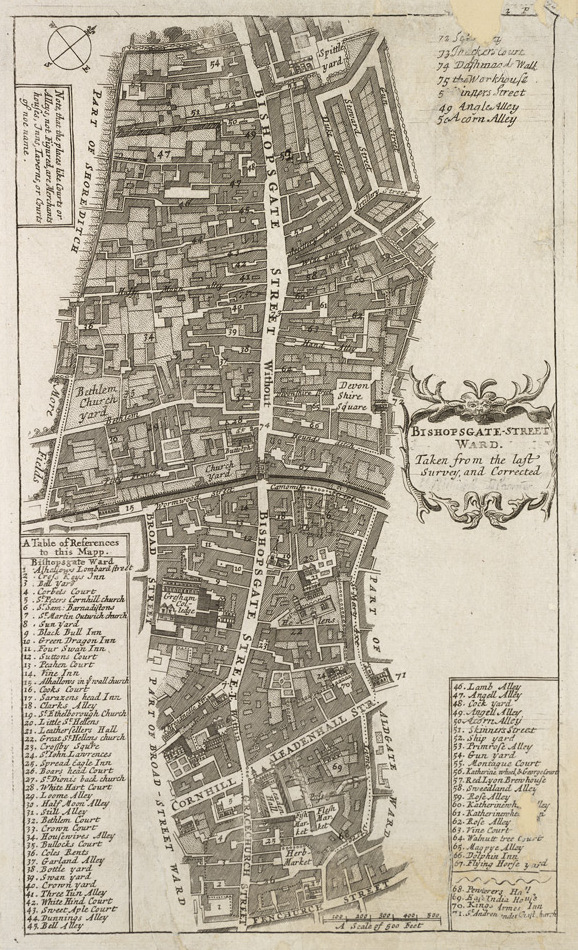
A 1720 map of Bishopsgate ward, clearly showing London Wall; the street and ward to the north is regarded as being "Without" while to the south is "Within".

=== Origin ===
The wards appear to have taken shape by the 11th century, before the Norman Conquest of England. Their administrative, judicial and militia purposes made them equivalent to hundreds in the shires. The primary purpose of wards that had a gate on the city wall appears to be the defence of that gate, as gates were the weakest points in any fortification.

=== Civic representation ===
In 1322 it was settled that an assembly consisting of two people elected from each ward would create ordinances for the whole city; in 1346 the number of representatives from each ward was formally linked to the size of the ward. The Common Council as we know it today, as a representative body of the wards, was realised in 1384 when the city's guilds no longer elected members. The number of members of the Common Council grew to 240 by the mid-nineteenth century, but is today fixed at 100.

Each ward was divided into precincts, each of which elected one common councilman. As the number of precincts grew over time, the number of councilmen elected therefore also increased. The precincts have now been abolished.

=== Changes over time ===
The wards are ancient and their number has only changed three times since their creation in time immemorial. Their number was stated as 24 in the year 1206. In 1394 Farringdon was divided into Farringdon Within and Farringdon Without. In 1550 the ward of Bridge Without was created south of the river, with the ward of Bridge becoming Bridge Within. These two wards were merged in 1978, into the present-day Bridge ward. Thus the number of wards was 24 prior to 1394, 25 from 1394 to 1550, then 26 from 1550 to 1978, and has been 25 since 1978.

A map of the wards as they were in the late 19th century. Farringdon Within and Tower wards each had a detached part (no detached parts exist from 2003).

A map of the wards after the 2003 boundary review.

==== London Wall ====
The words "Without" and "Within" indicate whether the ward fell outside or within the London Wall, though only Farringdon and (formerly) Bridge have been split into separate wards in this way (Bridge Without was beyond the gates on London Bridge). Some wards—Aldersgate, Bishopsgate and Cripplegate—cover an area that was both within and without the Wall and, although not split into separate wards, often the part (or division) within the Wall is denoted (on maps, in documents, etc.) as being "Within" and the part outside the Wall as being "Without". Archaically "Infra" (within) and "Extra" (without) and the terms "intramural" and "extramural" had the same meaning.

=== 1994 boundary changes ===
Changes were made in 1994 to the City of London's external boundary with several London boroughs, which meant consequential changes to boundaries of several wards, where areas were transferred either to or from the city – the wards affected were: Farringdon Without, Cripplegate, Coleman Street, Bishopsgate, Aldgate, Portsoken, and Tower.

=== Boundary reviews ===
Following a significant reform of the business vote in the city, all the wards underwent a major boundary and electoral representation revision in 2003. The ward boundaries, and electoral representation at the Court of Common Council, were reviewed again in 2010 for change in 2013, though the change was less extensive this time. The reviews were conducted by senior officers of the corporation and senior judges of the Old Bailey. The wards are not reviewed by the Electoral Commission or a local government boundary commission under the Parliamentary Constituencies Act 1986 and (unlike other local government electoral reviews) the number and the names of the wards do not change.

The final decision on changes to ward boundaries and representation was made by the Court of Common Council and an Act of Common Council was passed on 4 November 2010 to give effect to the changes from 8 March 2013.

A map of the wards after 2010 boundary review

== Electoral representation ==
Under the current arrangements, each ward is an electoral district, electing one alderman to the Court of Aldermen, and between two and ten common councilmen (the city's equivalent of a councillor) to the Court of Common Council. The number of common councilmen elected by a ward depends inter alia on the number of electors (which comprises both of residents and the business vote) in the ward.

Only electors who are freemen are eligible to stand. Instead of a conventional electoral register, each ward has a ward list. All common councilmen are elected every four years in one set of elections held citywide. A by-election in a particular ward can occur between scheduled elections if a vacancy arises, for example, by the resignation or death of a councilman. The elections of aldermen are held individually from one another and arise if the sitting alderman dies, resigns or (after the six-year term) puts themselves up for re-election.

Since the 2003 review (and confirmed by the 2013 review process) the four residential wards elect twenty of the hundred common councilmen, and the remaining, "business-dominated" wards elect the remaining eighty councilmen. The four residential wards are Portsoken, Queenhithe, Aldersgate and Cripplegate, and the 2003 boundary changes reinforced this. The majority of City residents are in the Barbican Estate, which is split between Aldersgate and Cripplegate wards. There are a minimum of two common councilmen per ward and three specific wards have their number of councilmen capped: Farringdon Without at ten, Cripplegate at nine and Farringdon Within at eight.

=== Changes from 2013 ===
With boundary changes as well as changes in the electorate, the elections in 2013 and 2017 elected a revised number of common councilmen in a number of wards. The present and altered representation is shown in the main ward summary table below; the total number of common councilmen (one hundred) will not change. The cap on Farringdon Without is maintained; the wards of Farringdon Within and Castle Baynard each have eight councilmen by normal allocation.

== Divisions and precincts ==
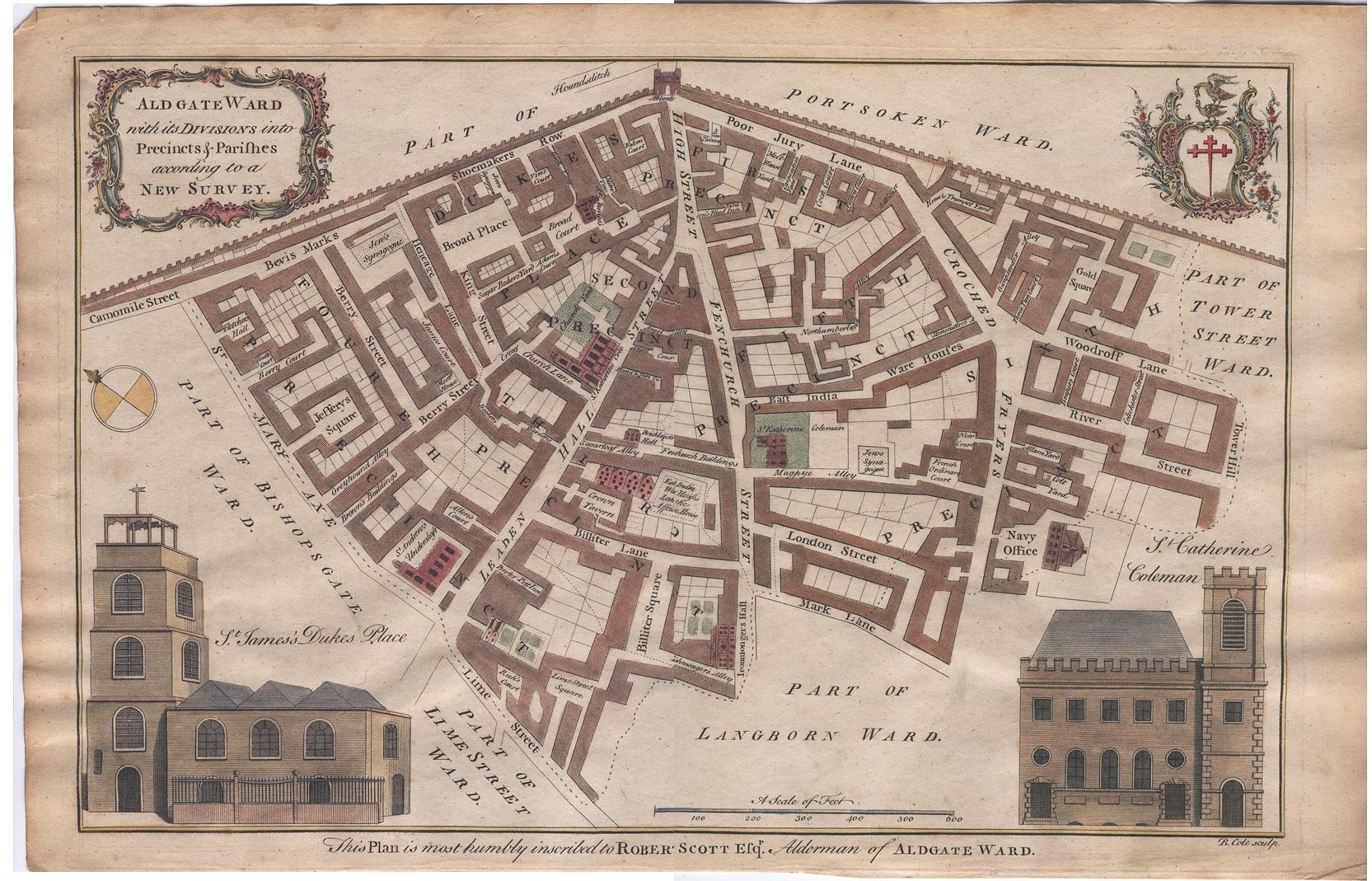
A 1755 map of Aldgate, showing its precincts (six numbered and one named).

Some wards were, or are, divided into two divisions (these are given in the main ward list of this article) and where this happens a Deputy is appointed by the Alderman for each division, instead of the one for the whole ward. Additionally, all wards were further divided into precincts.

The numbers and names of these precincts changed gradually over the centuries; precincts were named in various manners across the city's wards. In some wards they were named after localities or the numerous parishes (on which many precincts were based), in other wards they were simply given numbers. In those wards which were divided into divisions, the precincts were allocated to one division or another.

=== Precincts ===
As of around 1800, the numbers of precincts in each ward (and for each division in brackets) were: Aldersgate 8 (4 Within and 4 Without), Aldgate 7, Bassishaw 2, Billingsgate 12, Bishopsgate 9 (5 Within and 4 Without), Bread Street 13, Bridge Within 14, Broad Street 10, Candlewick 7, Castle Baynard 10, Cheap 9, Coleman Street 6, Cordwainer 8, Cornhill 4, Cripplegate 13 (9 Within and 4 Without), Dowgate 8, Farringdon Within 17, Farringdon Without 16, Langbourn 12, Lime Street 4, Portsoken 5, Queenhithe 6, Tower 12, Vintry 9, and Walbrook 7. This amounted to 228 precincts, making each precinct on average around 3 acres (1.2 ha) in size. The City of London was very densely populated until the mid-19th century, giving each precinct in the region of 500 residents on average.

A record of the wards, their divisions and precincts (including the names of the precincts) in 1715 give the following differences from the above figures: Aldersgate Within 5, Billingsgate 6, Broad Street 8 (4 Upper and 4 Lower), Castle Baynard 7 (4 First and 3 Second), Farringdon Without 15 (Fleet Street Side 8 and Holborn Side 7), and Queenhithe 9. This record also states the numbers of precincts for each division in two further wards: Dowgate (4 West and 4 East), and Langbourn (7 West and 5 East). This made a total of 220 precincts in 1715.

Each precinct elected a Common Councilman. In 1831 there were a total of 236 Common Councilmen (including Deputies, some of whom were elected in their wards in addition to the Councilmen elected by precincts). The ward of Bridge Without had no precincts and did not elect any Common Councilmen throughout its history.

Precincts no longer exist in the city.

== List of wards ==
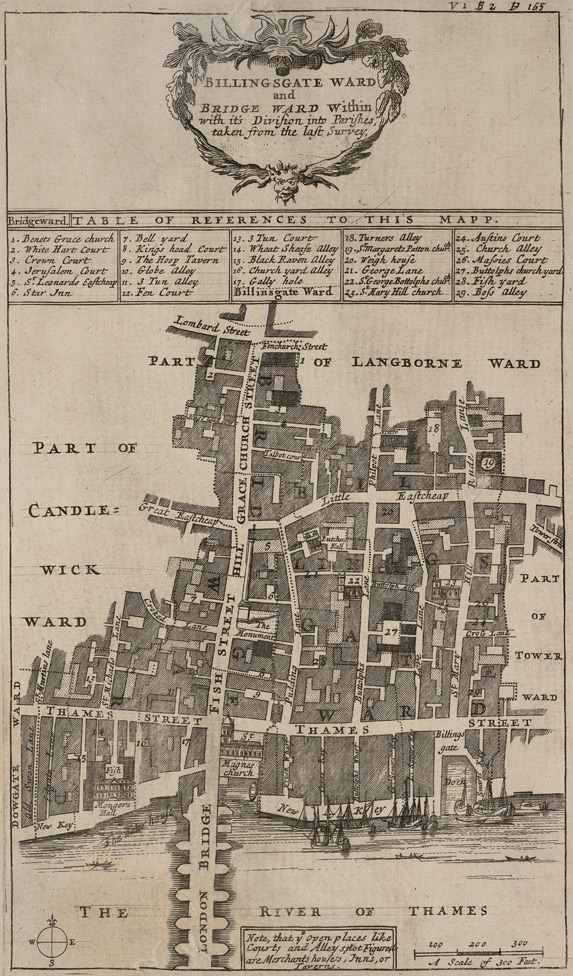
A 1720 map showing the wards of Billingsgate and Bridge Within.

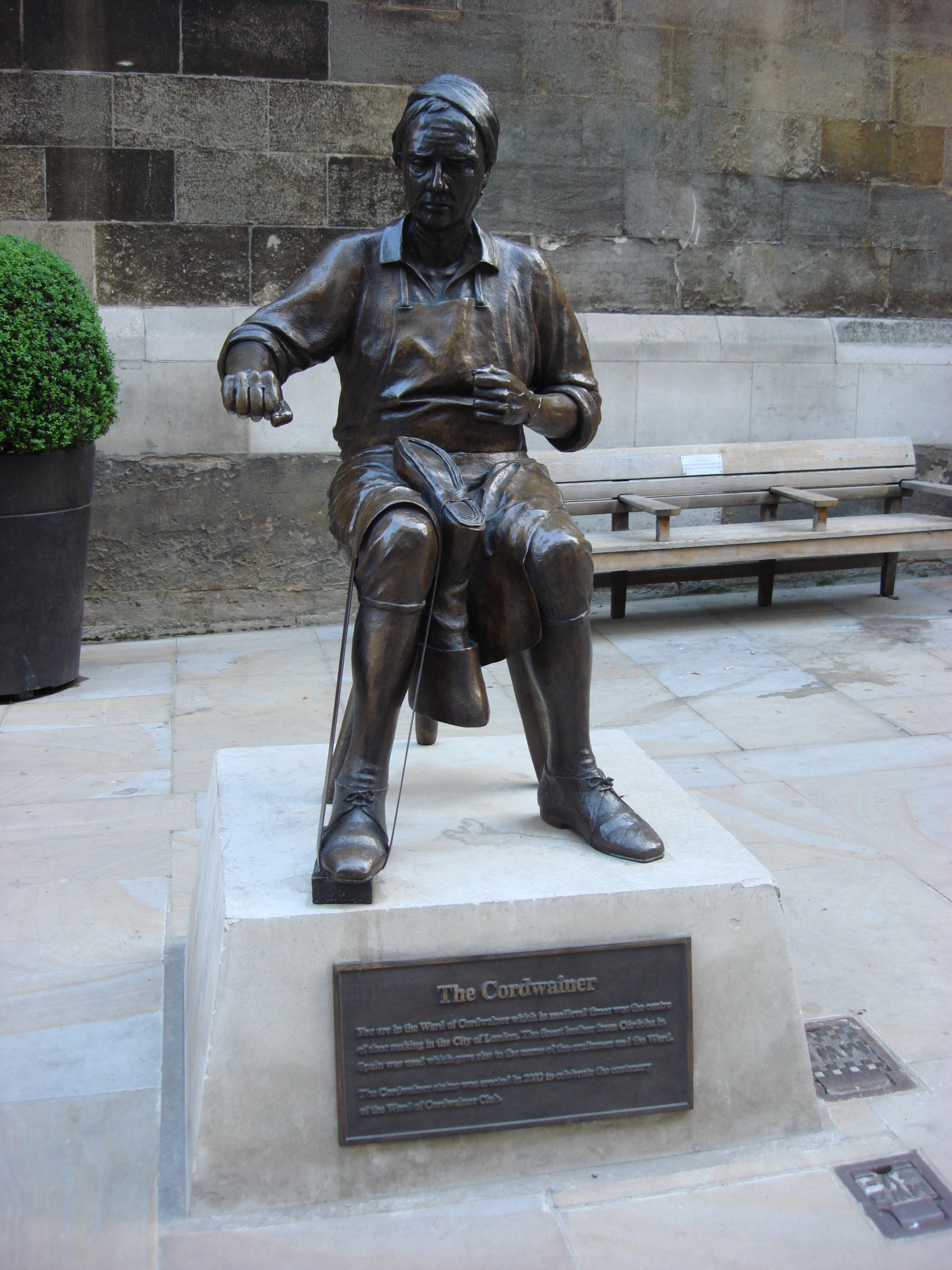
A statue of a cordwainer: the trade gave its name to Cordwainer ward.

The number of Commoners each ward returns to the Court of Common Council is given (for both before and after the 2013 election); being largely based on the size of the electorate, this gives some indication as to the present number of residents (with respect to the four residential wards) and the scale of business activity. (A † symbol is shown where the representation has been capped despite the normal allocation rules.)

Ward	Common Councilmen		Divisions	Notes
Ward	2003–2013	2013–	Divisions	Notes
Aldersgate	5	6	Often (though not currently) divided into "Within" and "Without"	Named for the Roman gate.
Aldgate	5	5	None	Named for the Roman gate.
Bassishaw	3	2	None	Archaically named "Basinghall ward"; historically the smallest ward.
Billingsgate	2	2	None	Riverside ward, named for a water gate, legendarily built for king Belinus.
Bishopsgate	8	6	Often (even today) divided into "Within" and "Without", with a Deputy appointed for each division	Named for the Roman gate.
Bread Street	2	2	None	Named for what was its principal thoroughfare.
Bridge and Bridge Without	2	2	None	Named for London Bridge. Merger of Bridge (Within) with Bridge Without in 1978; commonly known simply as Bridge.
Broad Street	3	3	Historically (pre-c. 1800) was divided into "Upper" and "Lower" divisions.	Named for its principal thoroughfare.
Candlewick	2	2	None	Named for Cannon Street, which historically was called Candlewright (or Candlewick) Street.
Castle Baynard	7	8	Historically (pre-c. 1800) was divided into "First" and "Second" divisions	Named after Baynard's Castle.
Cheap	2	3	None	Archaic word meaning "market".
Coleman Street	5	4	None	Named for what was its principal thoroughfare.
Cordwainer	3	3	None	Sometimes referred to as the "Cordwainers' ward" — the trade which gave the ward its name.
Cornhill	2	3	None	Named for the Corn Hill, one of the highest points of the city.
Cripplegate	9†	8	Often (even today) divided into "Within" and "Without", with 5 Councilmen allocated to Within, 4 to Without, and a Beadle and a Deputy appointed for each division	Named for the Roman gate.
Dowgate	2	2	Historically (pre-c. 1800) was divided into "East" and "West" divisions.	Named for a water gate.
Farringdon Within	8†	8	Currently divided into "North" and "South" sides, with 4 Common Councilmen allocated to and a Deputy appointed for each side	Result of split of Farringdon ward in 1394; within the London Wall.
Farringdon Without	10†	10†	Divided (historically) into Fleet Street and Holborn sides, or (historically and currently) into "North" and "South" sides with 5 Common Councilmen allocated to and a Deputy appointed for each side. City Police however now split ward east–west	Result of split of Farringdon ward in 1394; outside the Wall; includes Inner Temple and Middle Temple.
Langbourn	2	3	Historically (pre-c. 1800) was divided into "East" and "West" divisions	Spelt variously over the ages; possibly named after a supposed subterranean stream.
Lime Street	3	4	None	Named for Lime Street, a thoroughfare.
Portsoken	4	4	None	Lay entirely outside the London Wall.
Queenhithe	2	2	None	Named for the ancient dock.
Tower	5	4	None	Historically known as "Tower Street ward", historically its principal thoroughfare, which leads to the adjacent Tower of London.
Vintry	2	2	None	Named for its association with the Vintners.
Walbrook	2	2	None	Named after the small (now subterranean) stream that flows through the area.

=== Former wards ===
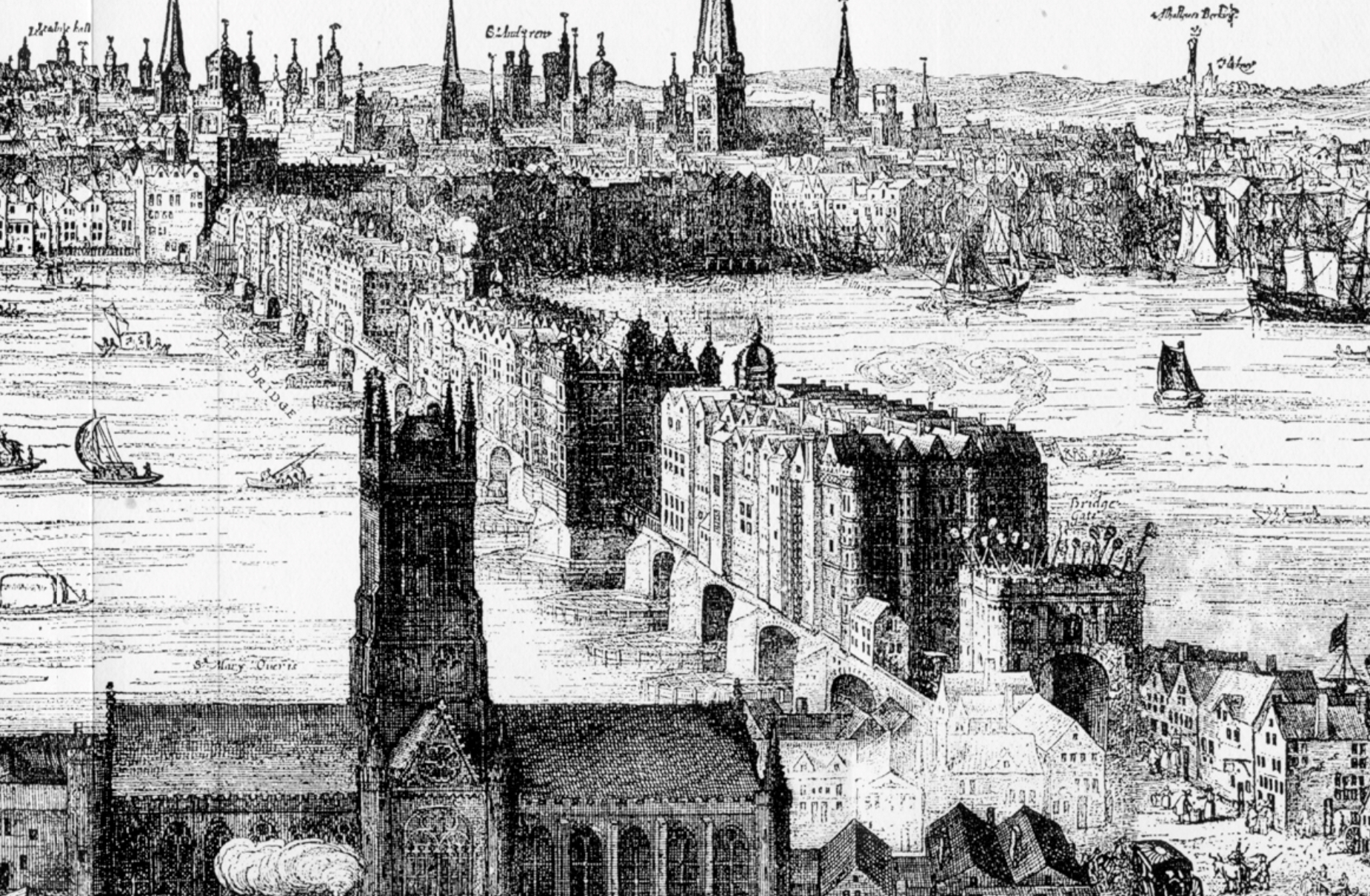
Between 1550 and 1899, the City extended south of the Thames into Southwark, with the Ward of Bridge Without.

Ward	Notes
Farringdon	Named after an alderman, before which it was known variously as the "Ward of Ludgate and Newgate" (two of the Roman gates), or "Fleet (Street) Ward" (the river and street to its west). It became by far the largest ward due to the city's westward expansion, and split into separate Farringdon Within and Farringdon Without wards in 1394.
Bridge Without	Created in 1550; the only City ward south of the Thames (and in Surrey); ceased to be part of the City in 1899, however only de jure merged with Bridge (Within) in 1978

== See also ==
- City of London Corporation
- City of London § Governance
- Livery company
- Wards and electoral divisions of the United Kingdom
