= Ann Baynard =

English philosopher (1672–1697)

Ann Baynard (sometimes spelled Anne) (1672 in Preston, Lancashire, England – 12 June 1697, Barnes, Surrey) was an English natural philosopher and model of piety. She sought discussions with atheists and non-Christians. Later, during her eulogy, Reverend Prude called her philosophical knowledge of this 20-year-old woman the same size as that of an "old bearded male philosopher"

== Life ==
Like most young women of her class, Ann Baynard was tutored by her father, Edward Baynard (c. 1641–1717), physician and pseudonymous poet and a member of the Royal College of Physicians in London, in science, mathematics, philosophy, and classical languages and literature. Her education encompassed classical languages and philosophy as well as science and mathematics, preparing her for a scholarly life. Considered in her time an exemplar of piety and virtue, her erudition was directed to the elucidation of Protestant theology; she disdained secular learning for its own sake. Although she wrote a number of texts in Latin and English, none has survived, but she was distinguished in particular for her facility in Latin.

Baynard declared that secular learning was worthless unless it led to knowledge of God. She was a diligent churchgoer, never missing daily services unless prevented by illness, and spent much of her time in solitary meditation and other pious exercises. Generous to the poor, she set aside a fixed portion of her income for charity. Baynard was active in her attempts to persuade others to lead a religious life. She urged all young people to study philosophy, and, especially, to read the Bible, with a particular appeal to her own sex to make an effort to educate themselves.

Her epitaph read:

"Here lies that happy maiden, who often said,
That no man is happy until he is dead;
That the business of life is but playing the fool,
Which hath no relation to saving the soul:
For all the transaction that's under the sun,
Is doing of nothing—if that be not done,
All wisdom and knowledge does lie in this one."

Anne Baynard obiit June 12. An. ætat. suæ 25. Christi 1697.
O mortales! quotusquisque vestrum cogitet ex hoc momento pendet æternitas."

== Quotation ==
"I would wish that all young persons might be exhorted to read the great book of nature, wherein they may see the wisdom and power of the Creator, in the order of the universe, and in the production of all things." — Anne Baynard, 1697
