= Queenhithe =

Ward of the City of London

Coordinates: 51.511°N 0.097°W

- Ward
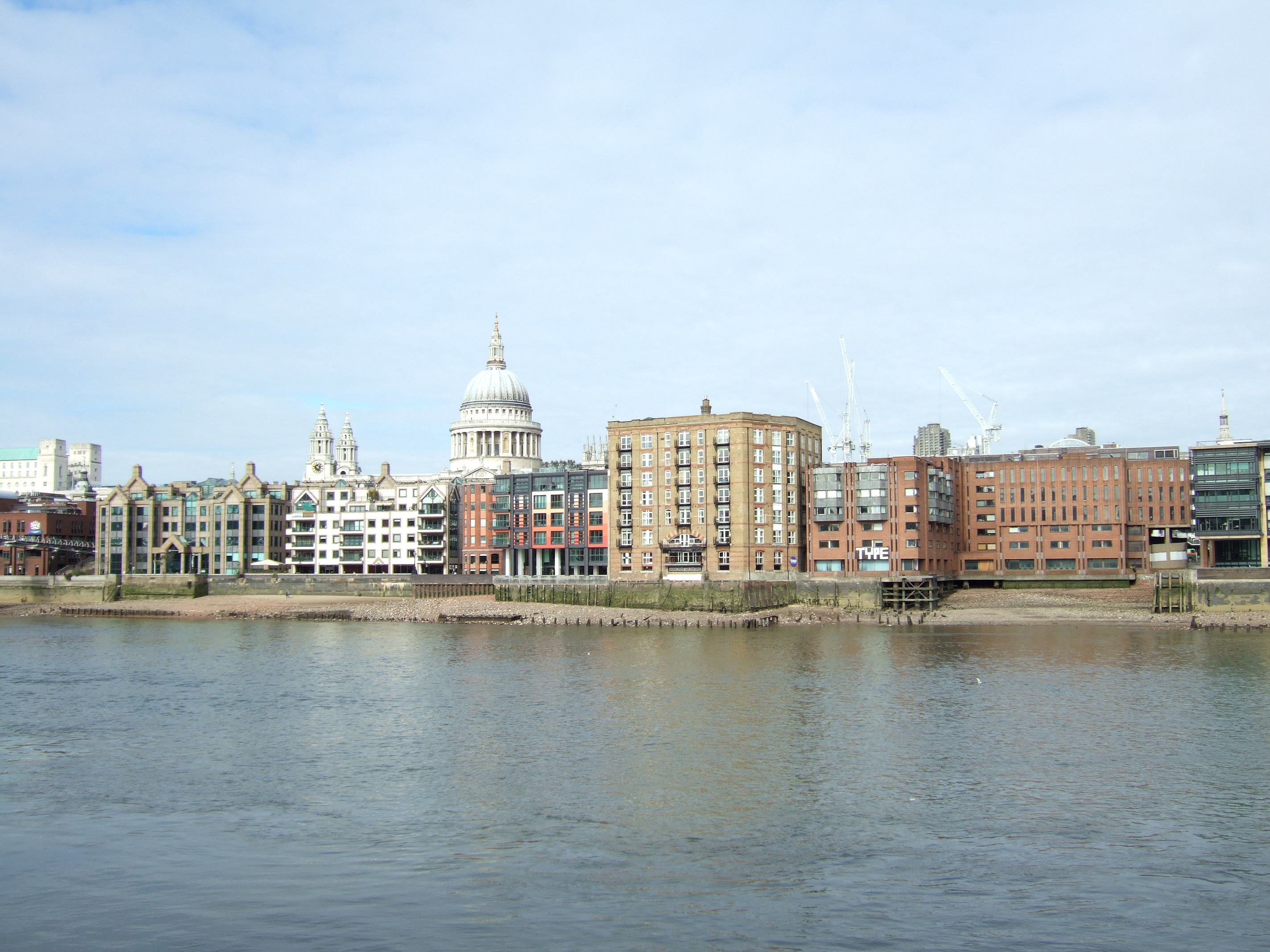
- The Queenhithe riverside (upstream to the left; Queenhithe dock on right) from Bankside

- Location within Greater London
- Queenhithe ward boundaries since 2013
- Population: 319 (2011 Census. Ward)
- OS grid reference: TQ321808
  - Charing Cross: 1.4 miles (2.3 km) West
- Sui generis: City of London
- Administrative area: Greater London
- Region: London
- Country: England
- Sovereign state: United Kingdom
- Post town: LONDON
- Postcode district: EC4
- Dialling code: 020
- Police: City of London
- Fire: London
- Ambulance: London
- UK Parliament: Cities of London and Westminster
- London Assembly: City and East

Queenhithe is a small and ancient ward of the City of London, situated by the River Thames and to the south of St. Paul's Cathedral. The Millennium Bridge crosses into the City at Queenhithe.

Queenhithe is also the name of the ancient, but now disused, dock and a minor street, which runs along that dock, both of which are within the ward.

The ward is served by London Buses route 4, which runs along Queen Victoria Street and stops by the Millennium footbridge, and the nearest London Underground station is Mansion House, on Queen Victoria Street.

== History ==
The ward's name derives from the "Queen's Dock", or "Queen's Quay", which was probably a Roman dock (or small harbour), but known in Saxon times as "Aeðereshyð", later "Ethelred's Hythe". The dock existed during the period when the Wessex king, Alfred the Great, re-established the City of London, circa 886 AD. It only became "Queenhithe" (spelt archaically as "Queenhythe") when Matilda, wife of King Henry I, was granted duties on goods landed there. The Queenhithe dock remains today, but has long fallen out of use and is heavily silted up (being tidal). Queenhithe harbour was used for importing corn into London and continued to be in use into the 20th century, by the fur and tanning trades. Being upstream of London Bridge, however, meant that large sea-going sailing ships could no longer safely reach the dock from the sea. King Charles II landed at Queenhithe during the Great Fire of London in September 1666 to view the extent of the destruction and assist in the firefighting.

The dock, including the wharf walls and adjacent street, was designated a scheduled monument in 1973; it is the only surviving inlet on the modern City's waterfront. Its walls have been re-strengthened, as part of London's flood defences.

Bombing in the Blitz destroyed approximately three-quarters of the ward's buildings: the only listed buildings are St Benet Paul's Wharf Church, and the tower of the former St Mary Somerset Church.

A key sequence of the 1951 comedy The Lavender Hill Mob used Queenhithe as a location for filming: Mr. Holland, played by Alec Guinness, can be seen falling from a wharf into the Thames and being rescued by two actors dressed as police officers.

Construction of the Millennium Bridge began in 1998 before its opening in 2000. The construction of this footbridge, which created a direct pedestrian route from Bankside (at the Tate Modern) to the St Paul's area, has contributed to a dramatic increase in tourists and commuters transitting the ward of Queenhithe.

== Notable sites ==
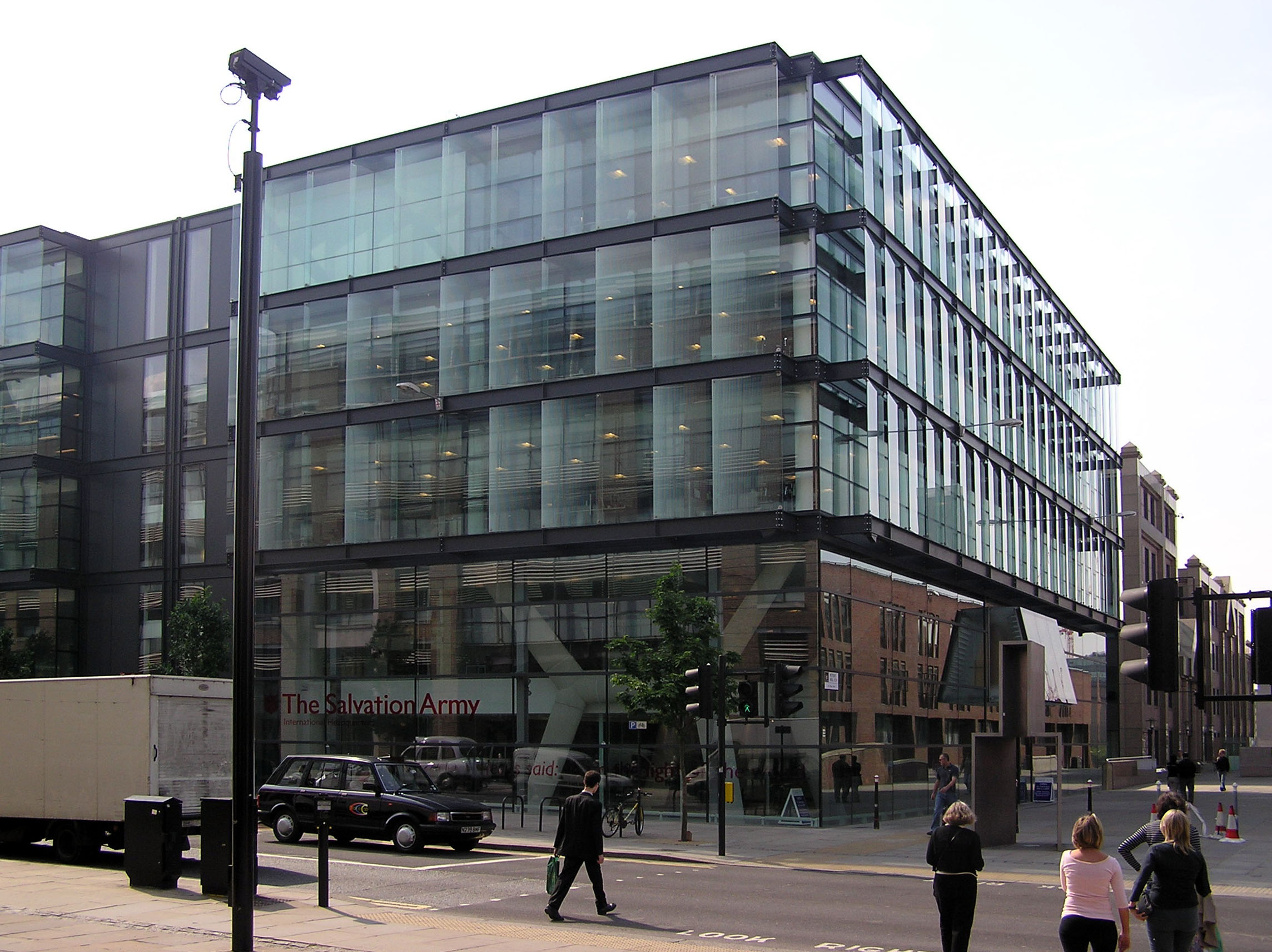
The Salvation Army's headquarters in Queenhithe.

Queenhithe includes a number of notable buildings and sites, including:

- The Aviation Environment Federation's headquarters, at No. 2, Broken Wharf;
- The City of London School, at No. 107, Queen Victoria Street;
- The Salvation Army's international headquarters, at No. 101, Queen Victoria Street, on the corner of Peter's Hill; and
- The Painter Stainers' Hall, at No. 9, Little Trinity Lane.
- The Queenhithe Mosaic, at 1 Queenhithe.

Also within the ward are the London offices of the international law firm Salans and the Japanese bank Sumitomo Mitsui Banking Corporation.

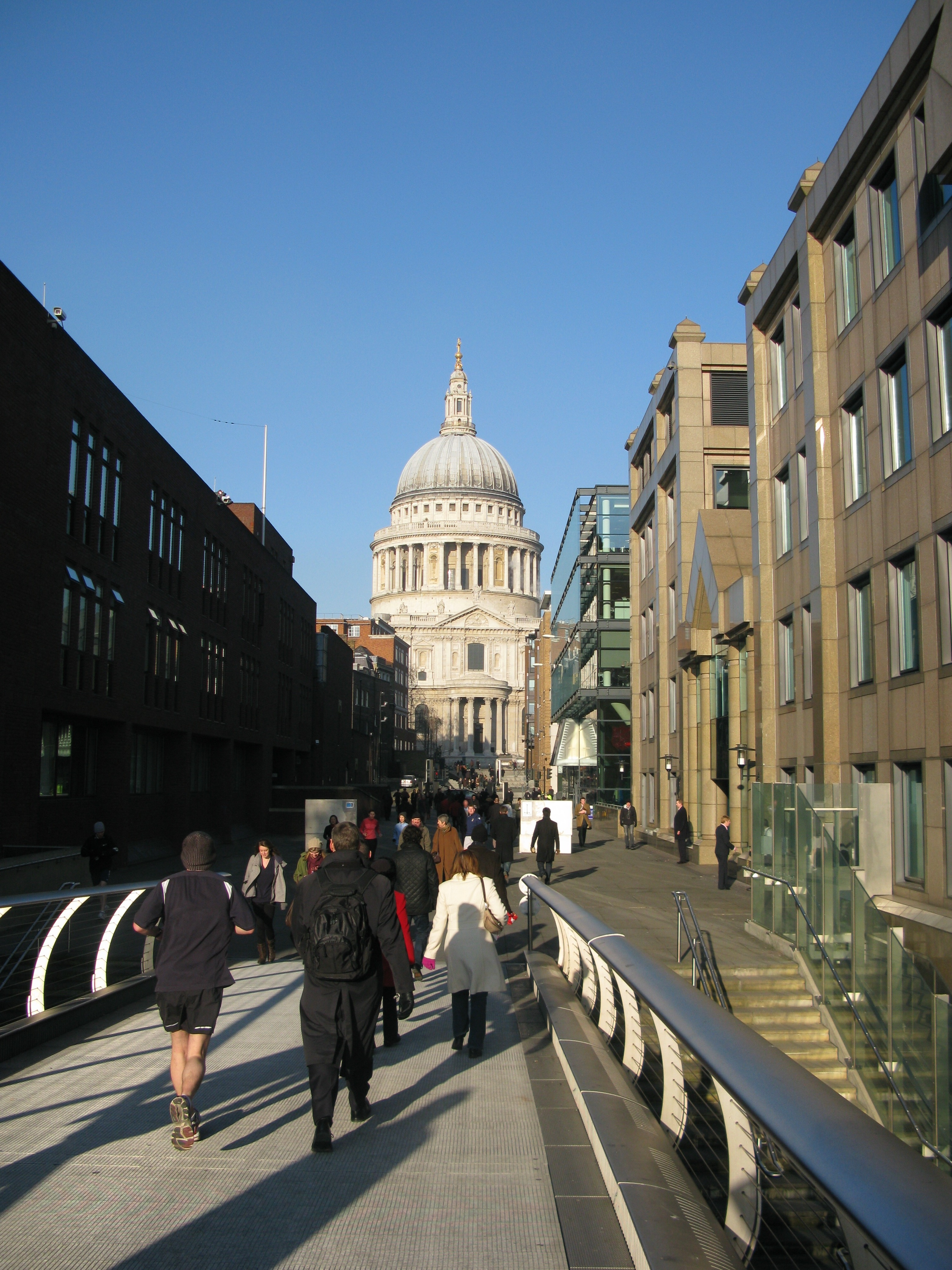
Peter's Hill, which since the construction of the Millennium footbridge is a major pedestrian route, shown leading up to St. Paul's Cathedral.

The ward has a complex urban topography, largely due to post-World War II development, with Upper Thames Street running beneath Peter's Hill and a number of large post-War buildings, such as Millennium Bridge House and Queensbridge House. A number of old lanes and alleys remain, some of which cross the thoroughfare by footbridge.

The Welsh church of St Benet Paul's Wharf, on Bennet's Hill, is in the northwest corner of the ward. Two former churches were situated within the ward, very near to one another: St Michael Queenhithe and St Mary Somerset, of which only the tower of St Mary's remains.

The Queenhithe Mosaic is a 30-metre-long timeline on the wall of Queenhithe Dock. The mosaic was completed in 2014 and features key figures from history who built and used the dock and lived nearby.

Queenhithe is one of the smaller residential centres in the otherwise business-dominated City; with a population of 319 as of 2011, it mostly comprises the residents of the three riverside residential developments: Sir John Lyon House, Globe View and Queen's Quay. A small number of bars and restaurants have been established along the riverside, with views across to the Globe theatre and Tate Modern.

== Boundary ==
In 2003 the ward boundaries of the City of London were altered quite considerably, including those of Queenhithe, in what was the first comprehensive review of local government boundaries. Queenhithe lost some ground to the north and east to Vintry, but gained (including the City of London School) to the west from Castle Baynard. A further review of ward boundaries, effective in 2013, recommended no further changes to Queenhithe's boundaries. The ward is recognised as one of the four residential wards of the City (with a population of 319 (2011), the smallest of those wards) and policy is to retain a predominantly residential vote (as opposed to the business vote being predominant) in these wards.

The present-day boundary of the ward, starting from the Thames in the west, runs north along White Lion Hill (to the west of the City School) then east along Queen Victoria Street then down Lambeth Hill. The boundary then runs for a short distance along Upper Thames Street before heading north up Huggin Hill to include Painters' Hall, after which the boundary turns south towards the river again; the ward includes all of Queensbridge House. Leading to the river, the boundary crosses Upper Thames Street and then runs along Queenhithe (the street), including the whole of the old Queenhithe dock.

Included within the ward boundary is the part of the Thames, adjacent to the Queenhithe shore, which is in the City (i.e. to a line midway across the width of the river). Indeed, approximately half of the ward's area is the River Thames and shore; with this part excluded the ward is the smallest (by area) in the City. The ward (and City) boundary is crossed halfway over the Millennium Bridge.

The ward is bounded by the wards of Castle Baynard to the west, Bread Street to the north, Vintry to the east, and the London Borough of Southwark to the south (across the river). Prior to the 2003 changes it also bounded Cordwainer ward.

== Politics ==
Queenhithe is one of 25 wards in the City of London, each electing an alderman to the Court of Aldermen, and commoners (the City equivalent of a councillor) to the Court of Common Council of the City of London Corporation. Only Freemen of the City of London are eligible to stand for election.

Queenhithe returns an alderman and two Common Councilmen to the Corporation of London.

== Queenhythe, Jamaica ==
A rural community called Queenhythe (or Queen Hythe) exists in the Saint Ann parish of Jamaica. As with many place names in that country, it is named after a locality in England.
