= Division (political geography) =

Administrative territorial entity in some Asian and African countries

A division is a type of administrative division of some Asian and African countries, all of them were part of the British Empire, as well as a type of electoral district for county councils in England and Ireland.

== Administrative divisions ==
Group	Continent	Level	Note
Divisions of Antigua and Barbuda	North America	2nd	only in Antigua
Divisions of Bangladesh	Asia	1st	after Districts of Bangladesh
Divisions of Cameroon (also called departments)	Africa	2nd	below provinces of Cameroon
Divisions of Fiji	Oceania	1st	
Divisions of the Gambia	Africa	1st	renamed to regions
Divisions of India	Asia	2nd	below states of India
Divisions of Malaysia	Asia	2nd	in two of the states of Malaysia: Sabah and Sarawak
Divisions of Myanmar	Asia	1st	renamed to regions, per 2008 Constitution
Divisions of Pakistan	Asia	2nd	below Provinces of Pakistan dissolved in 2000, re-established between 2008 and 2011

== England ==
In England, a division refers to the electoral district used for elections to a county council, with ward the usual term used for other authorities.

Some of the hundreds and wapentakes in England (of the historic counties of England) were divided into divisions. Also a number of the Wards of the City of London are, or were, divided into two divisions.
