= Broad Street (ward) =

Ward of the City of London

Coordinates: 51.5161°N 0.085°W

- Ward
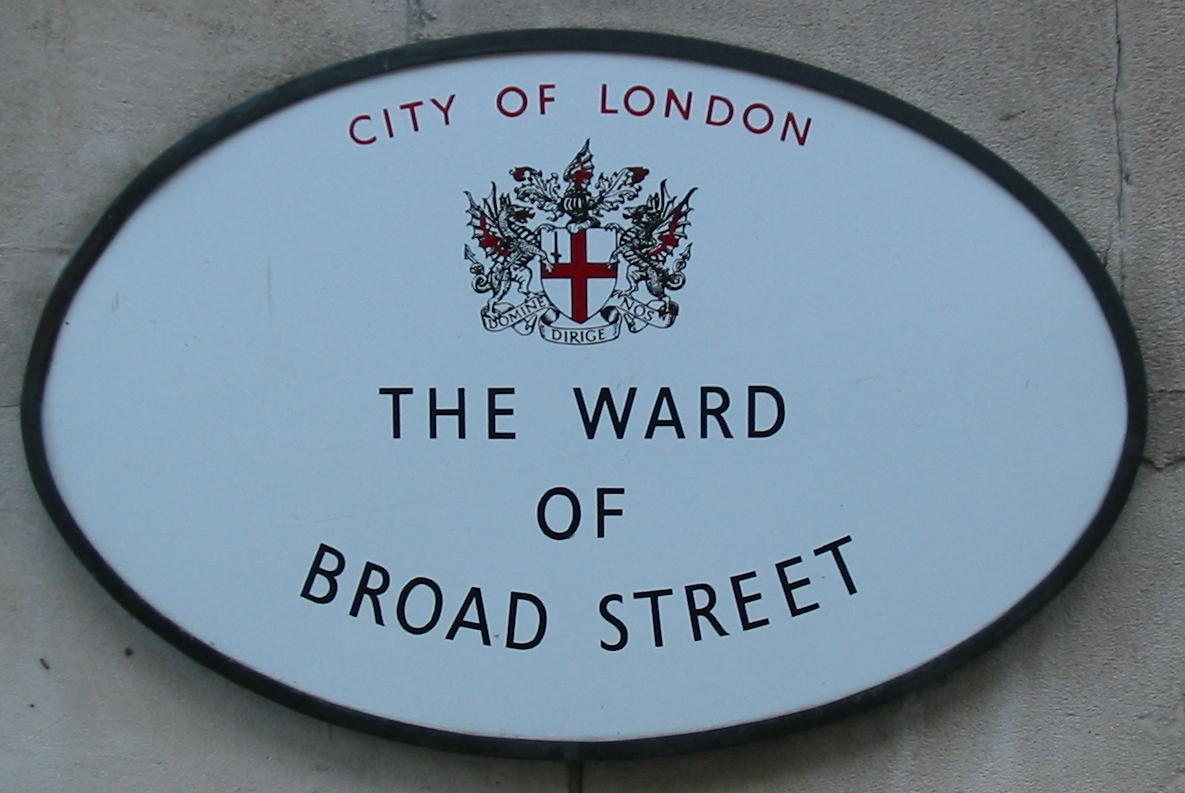
- Street plaque

- Location within Greater London
- Broad Street ward boundaries since 2013
- OS grid reference: TQ329814
- Sui generis: City of London
- Administrative area: Greater London
- Region: London
- Country: England
- Sovereign state: United Kingdom
- Post town: LONDON
- Postcode district: EC2
- Dialling code: 020
- Police: City of London
- Fire: London
- Ambulance: London
- UK Parliament: Cities of London and Westminster
- London Assembly: City and East

Broad Street is one of the 25 ancient wards of the City of London.

== History ==
In medieval times it was divided into ten precincts and contained six churches, of which only two, St Margaret Lothbury and All Hallows-on-the-Wall now survive: St Bartholomew-by-the-Exchange was demolished in 1840, St Benet Fink in 1844, St Martin Outwich in 1874 and St Peter le Poer in 1907.

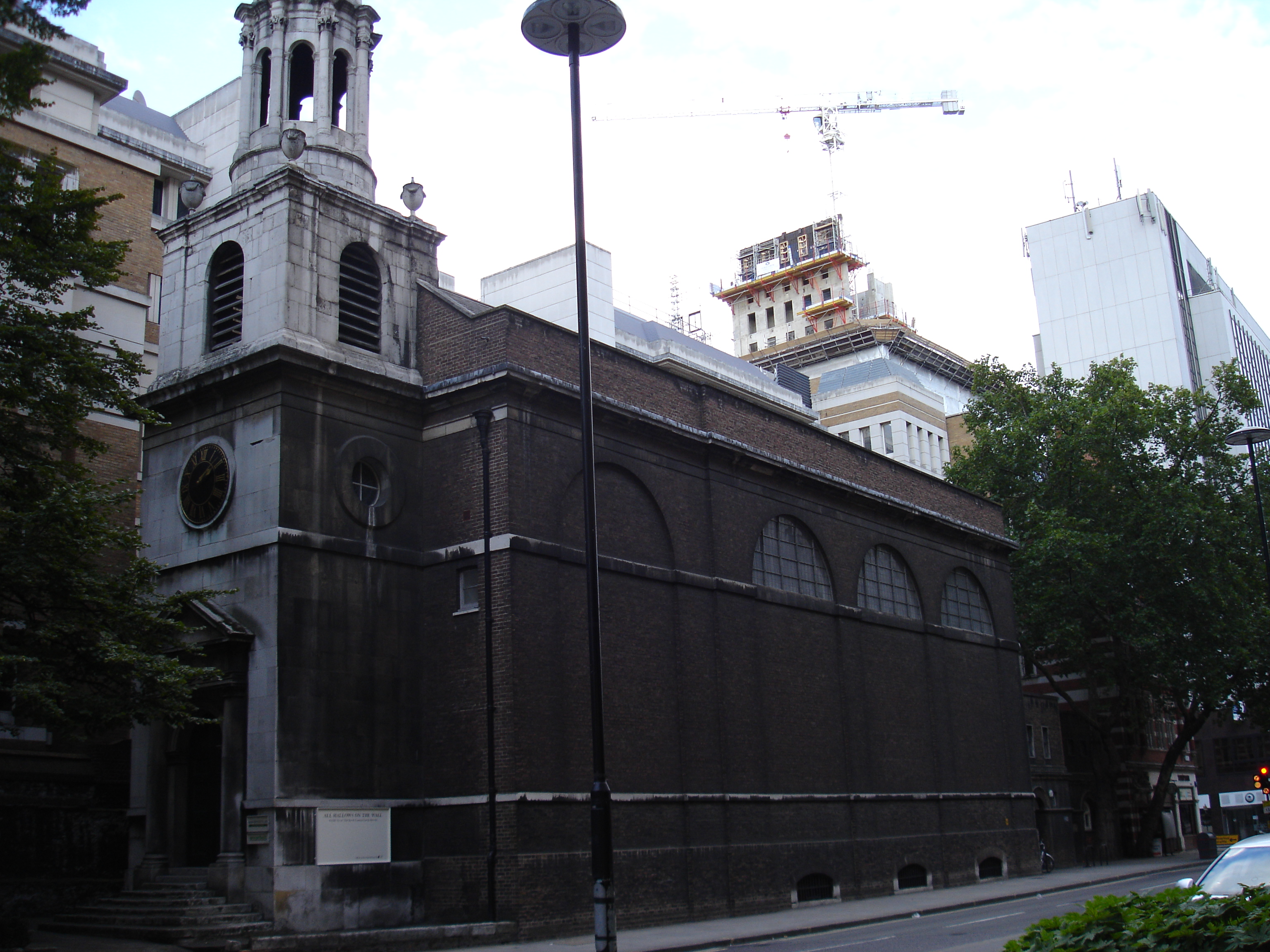
All Hallows-on-the-Wall church

The ward's northern boundary along London Wall and Blomfield Street borders Coleman Street ward, before curving to the north-east along Liverpool Street, the division with Bishopsgate. From here, Old Broad Street runs south-west along the border with Cornhill where it joins Throgmorton Street, its southern boundary—to the south of which is the Bank of England in Walbrook ward. The western boundary follows a series of small courts and alleys adjacent to Moorgate and then runs up Copthall Avenue. A busy commercial area it also contains two livery halls of the Worshipful Company of Carpenters and Worshipful Company of Drapers on the private Throgmorton Avenue which they jointly own. Like many of the City wards it has a social club for people who work in the area, which celebrated its 30th anniversary in March 2006.

At the top of Old Broad Street, adjacent to Liverpool Street station, was Broad Street station which closed in 1986—the only major terminus station in London to have permanently closed.

== Politics ==
Broad Street is one of 25 wards in the City of London, each electing an alderman to the Court of Aldermen and commoners (the City equivalent of a councillor) to the Court of Common Council of the City of London Corporation. Only electors who are Freemen of the City of London are eligible to stand.

=== Elected representatives ===
- Alderman: Michael Mainelli
- Deputy: Christopher Hayward
- Common Council: Shahnan Bakth, Antony Manchester
