= Bridge (City of London ward) =

Ward of the City of London

Coordinates: 51.511°N 0.085°W

Bridge: Bridge and Bridge Without
- Ward
- Location within Greater London
- Bridge ward boundaries since 2013
- OS grid reference: TQ319812
- Sui generis: City of London
- Administrative area: Greater London
- Region: London
- Country: England
- Sovereign state: United Kingdom
- Post town: LONDON
- Postcode district: EC3
- Postcode district: EC4
- Dialling code: 020
- Police: City of London
- Fire: London
- Ambulance: London
- UK Parliament: Cities of London and Westminster
- London Assembly: City and East

Bridge and Bridge Without is a small ward in the City of London and is named from its closeness to London Bridge. Since boundary changes in 2003, Bridge is bounded by the River Thames to the south, Swan Lane and Gracechurch Street to the west, Fenchurch Street to the north, and Rood Lane and Lovat Lane to the east.

The ward includes Fishmongers' Hall, St. Magnus-the-Martyr church, the Monument to the Great Fire of London, and the full span of London Bridge.

== Bridge Within and Bridge Without ==
The present day ward of Bridge was historically (1550–1978) known as Bridge Within — a separate ward called Bridge Without existed south of the Thames in Southwark with its own Alderman between 1550 and 1978. In 1550 the new ward of Bridge Without was created to cover the city's area of control of three manors in Southwark (the newly acquired King's Manor and Great Liberty added to the Guildable Manor which it had controlled since 1327), the Court of Aldermen appointing its alderman; there were never any members of the Court of Common Council elected there as the three Courts Leet of the Manors fulfilled that representative role. The ward on the bridge and just to its north became Bridge Within.

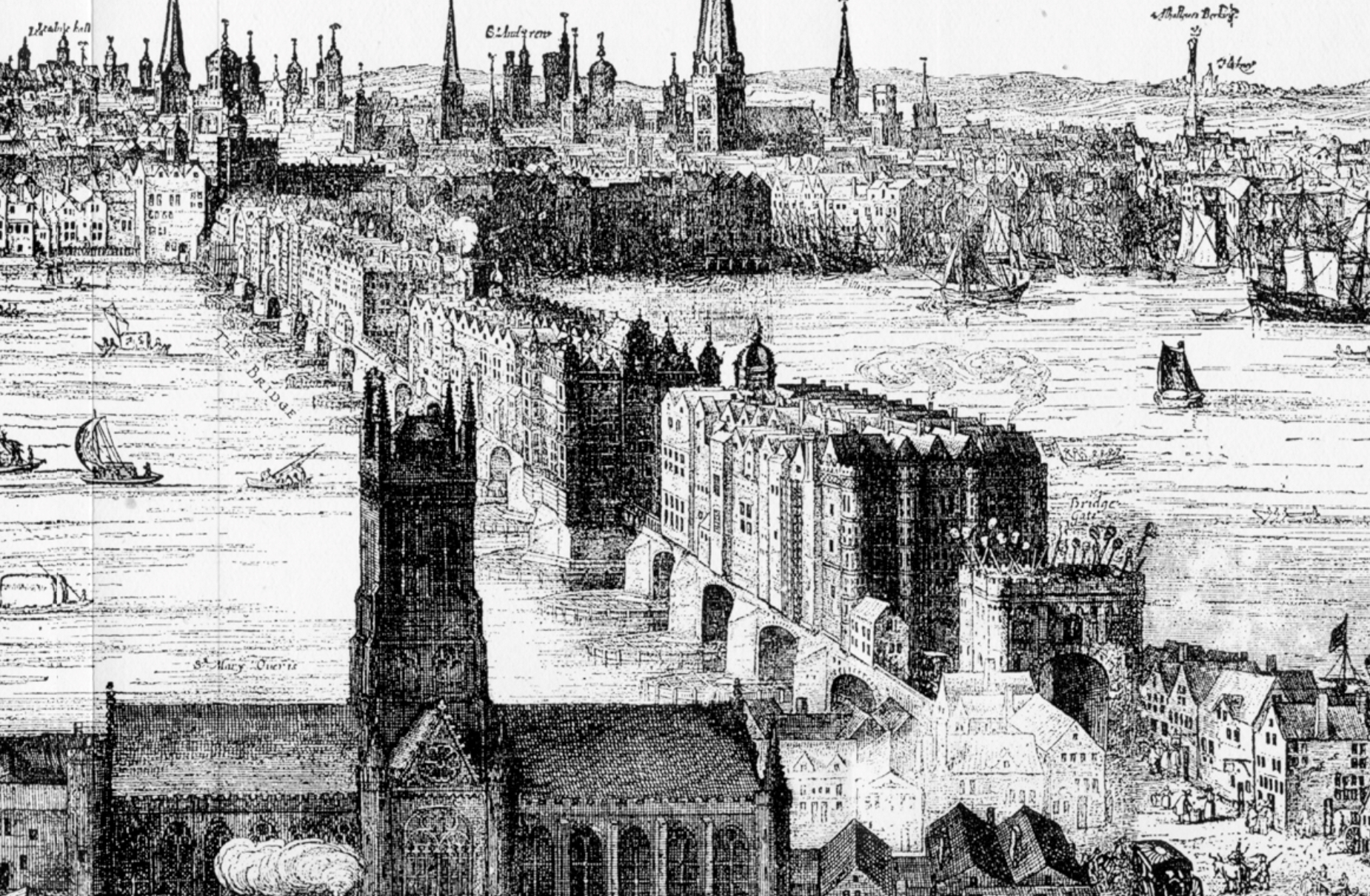
London Bridge viewed from Southwark: the Great Stone Gateway at the very southern end of the bridge formed the boundary between Within and Without.

However, the city's administrative responsibility for the Without ward had in practice disappeared by the mid-Victorian era as various aspects of metropolitan government were extended into the neighbouring areas.

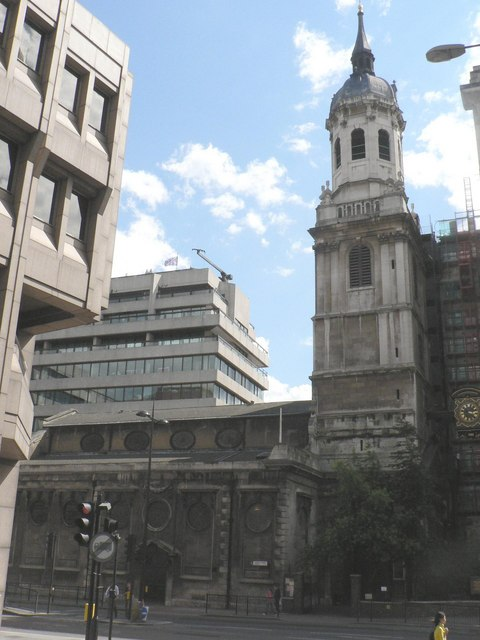
St. Magnus-the-Martyr church.

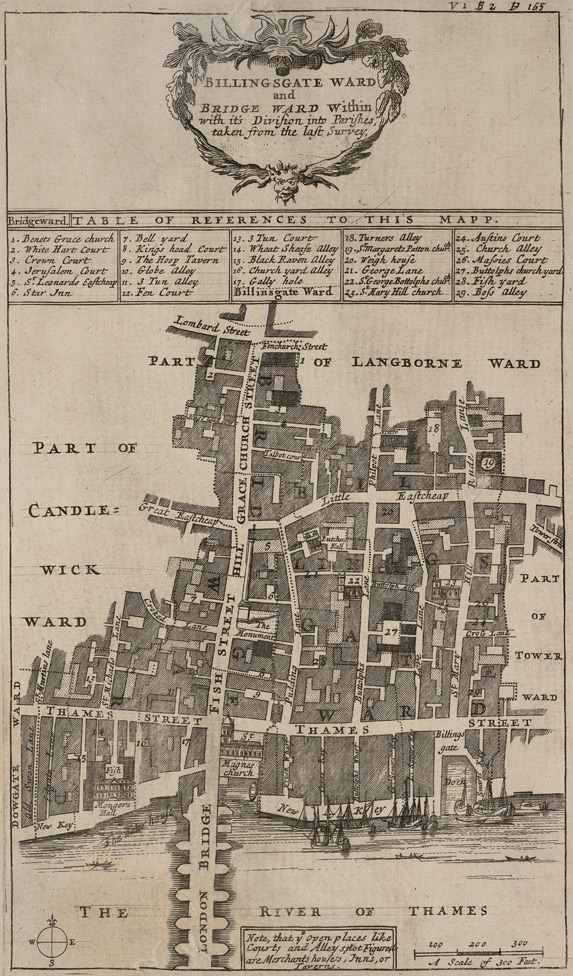
A 1720 map showing the wards of Bridge Within and neighbouring Billingsgate.

Despite the fact that the area of Bridge Without had been removed completely from the city's boundaries in 1899, the ward continued to de jure exist and the Court of Aldermen continued to appoint an alderman for the ward by co-option, usually the senior emeritus Lord Mayor (or father of the city) until as late as 1978 — Bridge Without was then merged with Bridge Within, to become the present day Bridge ward. This is, in a sense, a return to the situation prior to 1550. However the ward is still officially referred to as "Bridge and Bridge Without" as a result of the 1978 amalgamation. This had no practical effect in terms of representation on the Court of Common Council because Without had never had Councilmen.

"Without" and "Within" denote whether a ward, or a division of one, fell outside or within the London Wall — this is still the case for the wards of Farringdon Within and Farringdon Without — though in this instance Bridge Without fell beyond the gates on London Bridge, rather than London Wall itself. The full span of London Bridge was for many centuries lined with buildings, including many houses, and they formed part of the ward of Bridge Within. Indeed, so numerous were the dwellings on the bridge that at one time it constituted three of the 14 precincts (a former sub-division of the wards) of Bridge Within.

The area of the former Bridge Without ward today forms part of the London Borough of Southwark.

== Politics ==
Bridge is one of 25 wards in the City of London, each electing an alderman to the Court of Aldermen and commoners (the City equivalent of a councillor) to the Court of Common Council of the City of London Corporation. Only electors who are Freemen of the City of London are eligible to stand.

Bridge and Bridge Without currently elect two commoners to the Court of Common Council.
