= Farringdon Within =

Ward of the City of London

Coordinates: 51.51438°N 0.10343°W

- Ward
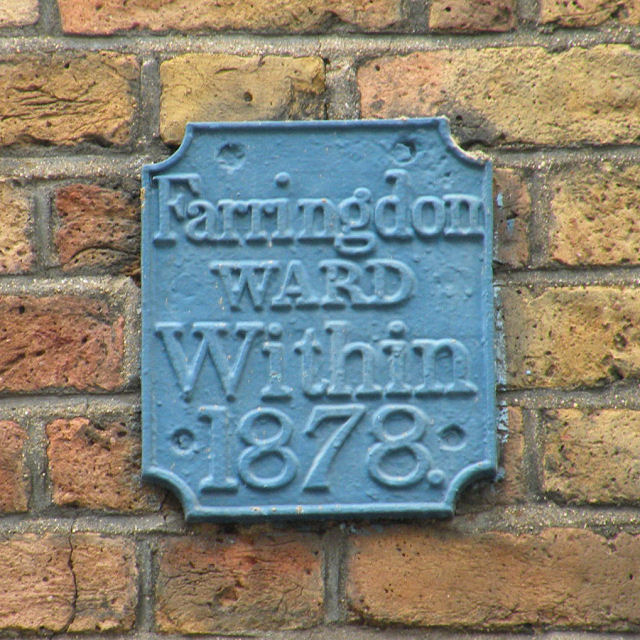
- Ward boundary marker

- Location within Greater London
- Farringdon Within ward boundaries since 2013
- Population: 276 (2011 Census. Ward)
- OS grid reference: TQ317812
- Sui generis: City of London
- Administrative area: Greater London
- Region: London
- Country: England
- Sovereign state: United Kingdom
- Post town: LONDON
- Postcode district: EC1, EC4
- Dialling code: 020
- Police: City of London
- Fire: London
- Ambulance: London
- UK Parliament: Cities of London and Westminster
- London Assembly: City and East

Farringdon Within is one of the 25 wards of the City of London, the historic and financial centre of London, England. It was formed in the 14th century from the sub-division of the pre-existing Farringdon Ward into Farringdon Within (inside the line of the Former London Wall), and Farringdon Without, beyond the Wall.

Farringdon Without and Farringdon Within are unconnected to the Farringdon area to the north, outside the City, in the London Borough of Islington. The area is sometimes referred to as Farringdon due to the presence of Farringdon Station, which was named after Farringdon Street and originally named Farringdon Street Station.

== Origin ==
=== Before the division of Farringdon ward ===
The Wards of London appear to have taken shape in the 11th century, before the Norman Conquest. Their administrative, judicial and military purpose made them equivalent to Hundreds in the countryside. The primary purpose of Wards like Farringdon, which included a gate, appears to be the defence of the gate, as gates were the weakest points in any fortification. Farringdon was a very large ward and had two gates, Ludgate and Newgate, (previously called Chamberlains Gate after an area of land called the Chamberlain's Soke, lying just outside the gate).

Early charters show that the western boundary of the City and Westminster was pushed back to approximately its current position in around 1000, though the area outside the walls is thought to have been sparsely populated, if at all, at this time. The boundary markers at West Smithfield Bars were mentioned in 1170 and 1197.

Early names for the undivided ward included the Ward of Ludgate and Newgate, and in the 13th century Flete Ward (after the River Fleet) and in the 14th Fleet Street Ward.

In the 12th and 13th centuries it was common practice was to refer to wards by the name of their Aldermen. In 1246 the part of the undivided Farringdon ward outside the wall is referred to as the ward of Henry of Frowyk without. and in 1276 the area was carried the name of another Alderman, as the Ward of Anketill de Auvergne.

Farringdon was later named after Sir Nicholas de Faringdon, who was appointed Lord Mayor of London for "as long as it shall please him" by King Edward II. The Ward had been in the Faringdon family for 82 years at this time, his father, William de Faringdon preceding him as Alderman in 1281, when he purchased the position. William de Faringdon was Lord Mayor in 1281–82 and also a Warden of the Goldsmiths' Company. During the reign of King Edward I, as an Alderman and Goldsmith, William Faringdon was implicated in the arrest of English Jewry (some, fellow goldsmiths) for treason.

=== Division of the ward ===
The Ward was split into Farringdon Without and Farringdon Within in 1394. "Without" and "Within" denote whether the ward fell outside or within the London Wall — such designation also applied to the wards of Bridge Within and Without.

The City of London's ancient wards, before the boundary changes of 1994 and 2013

=== 21st century boundary changes ===
Since boundary changes in 2003 Farringdon Within is no longer entirely within the former wall. The ward now covers an area from Blackfriars station in the south to Barbican station in the north.

== Politics ==
Farringdon Within is one of 25 wards in the City of London, each electing an alderman to the Court of Aldermen and commoners (the City equivalent of a councillor) elected to the Court of Common Council of the City of London Corporation. To be eligible to stand for election, candidates must be Freemen of the City of London or own land in the City or have lived in the City for the whole of the twelve months preceding the date of the nomination.

== Population ==
The resident population of the ward is 276 (2011).

== Notable people ==
- John Crowder (died 1830), alderman; Lord Mayor of London
