= Farringdon Without =

Ward of the City of London

Coordinates: 51.51627°N 0.10911°W

- Ward
- Location within Greater London
- Farringdon Without ward boundaries since 2013
- Population: 1,099 (2011 Census. Ward)
- OS grid reference: TQ313814
- Sui generis: City of London
- Administrative area: Greater London
- Region: London
- Country: England
- Sovereign state: United Kingdom
- Post town: LONDON
- Postcode district: EC1, EC4
- Dialling code: 020
- Police: City of London
- Fire: London
- Ambulance: London
- UK Parliament: Cities of London and Westminster
- London Assembly: City and East

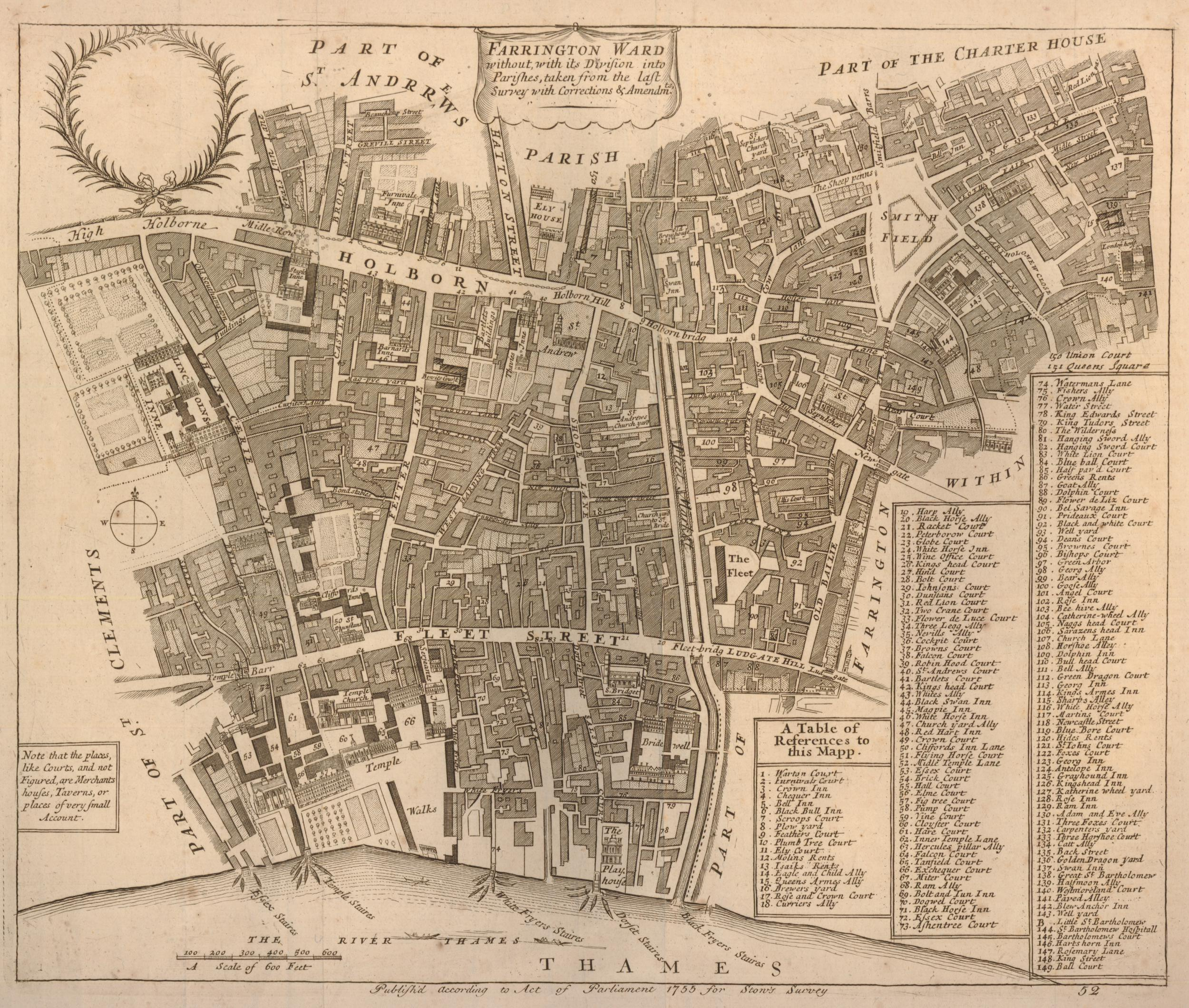
Map of Farringdon Without, 1755

Farringdon Without is the most westerly ward of the City of London, England. Its suffix Without reflects its origin as lying beyond the City's former defensive walls. It was first established in 1394 to administer the suburbs west of Ludgate and Newgate, including West Smithfield and Temple. This was achieved by splitting the very large, pre-existing Farringdon Ward into two parts, Farringdon Within (inside the wall) and Farringdon Without (outside the wall). The large and prosperous extramural suburb of Farringdon Without has been described as having been London's first West End.

The ward was reduced in size considerably after a boundary review in 2003, and no longer corresponds closely to its historic extent, although it remains the largest of the City's 25 wards. Its resident population is 1,099 (2011).

Farringdon Without and Farringdon Within are unconnected to the Farringdon area to the north, outside the city, in the London Borough of Islington. The area is sometimes referred to as Farringdon due to the presence of Farringdon Station, which was named after Farringdon Street and originally named Farringdon Street Station.

== Setting ==
The ward administers the land beyond the city's former western gates, including the Middle Temple, Inner Temple, Smithfield and St Bartholomew's Hospital. Since the boundary changes to the City of London in 1994, the ward now extends further west to meet the City of Westminster at Chancery Lane.

The historic ward boundaries as they appeared in 1870

It includes land on both sides of the (now buried) River Fleet and part of its northern boundary was formed by the Fagswell Brook, which ran east to west along a line approximating to Charterhouse Street, before joining the Fleet which runs north to south under Farringdon Road and Farringdon Street.

The ward includes a part of Holborn; the church of St Andrew Holborn and the part of its parish known as St Andrew below the Bars – with the part known as St Andrew above the Bars outside the city (in the modern London Borough of Camden). The term Bars refers to the historic boundary marks the city established when its rights or jurisdiction came to extend beyond the walls.

Ornamental boundary markers known as West Smithfield Bars, first documented in 1170 and 1197, once marked the city's northern boundary. These stood close to the Charterhouse Street junction with St John Street (at the Fagswell Brook which formed the boundary before it was culverted over). Although the Smithfield Bars are lost, the ward still has Dragon boundary marks at Temple Bar, Farringdon Street and High Holborn.

== History ==
=== Before the division of Farringdon ward ===
The wards of London appear to have taken shape in the eleventh century, before the Norman Conquest. Their administrative, judicial and military purpose made them equivalent to Hundreds in the countryside. The primary purpose of wards like Farringdon, which included a gate, appears to be the defence of the gate, as gates were the weakest points in any fortification. Farringdon was a very large ward and had two gates, Ludgate and Newgate (previously called Chamberlains Gate after an area of land called the Chamberlain's Soke, lying just outside the gate).

Early charters show that the western boundary of the City and Westminster was pushed back to approximately its current position in around 1000, though the area outside the walls is thought to have been sparsely populated, if at all, at this time. The boundary markers at West Smithfield Bars were mentioned in 1170 and 1197. London was one of the first cities in Europe to develop segregated quarters and extramural suburbs, and the growth, west of the wall of its first 'West End' was well underway in the twelfth century. This early 'West End' suburb, heavily influenced by the proximity of the seat of government in Westminster, was based around large houses spread along the Thames, the Strand and the Holborn road.

Early names for the undivided ward included the Ward of Ludgate and Newgate, and in the thirteenth century Flete Ward (after the River Fleet) and in the fourteenth Fleet Street Ward.

In the twelfth and thirteenth centuries it was common practice was to refer to wards by the name of their aldermen. In 1246 the part of the undivided Farringdon ward outside the wall is referred to as the ward of Henry of Frowyk without. and in 1276 the area was carried the name of another Alderman, as the Ward of Anketill de Auvergne,

Farringdon was later named after Sir Nicholas de Faringdon, who was appointed Lord Mayor of London for "as long as it shall please him" by King Edward II. The ward had been in the Faringdon family for 82 years at this time, his father, William de Faringdon preceding him as alderman in 1281, when he purchased the position. William de Faringdon was a sheriff of London in 1279–80.

=== Division of the ward ===
Farringdon Ward was split in two in 1394: Farringdon Without and Farringdon Within. "Without" and "Within" denote whether the ward fell outside or within the London Wall — such designation also applied to the wards of Bridge Within and Without.

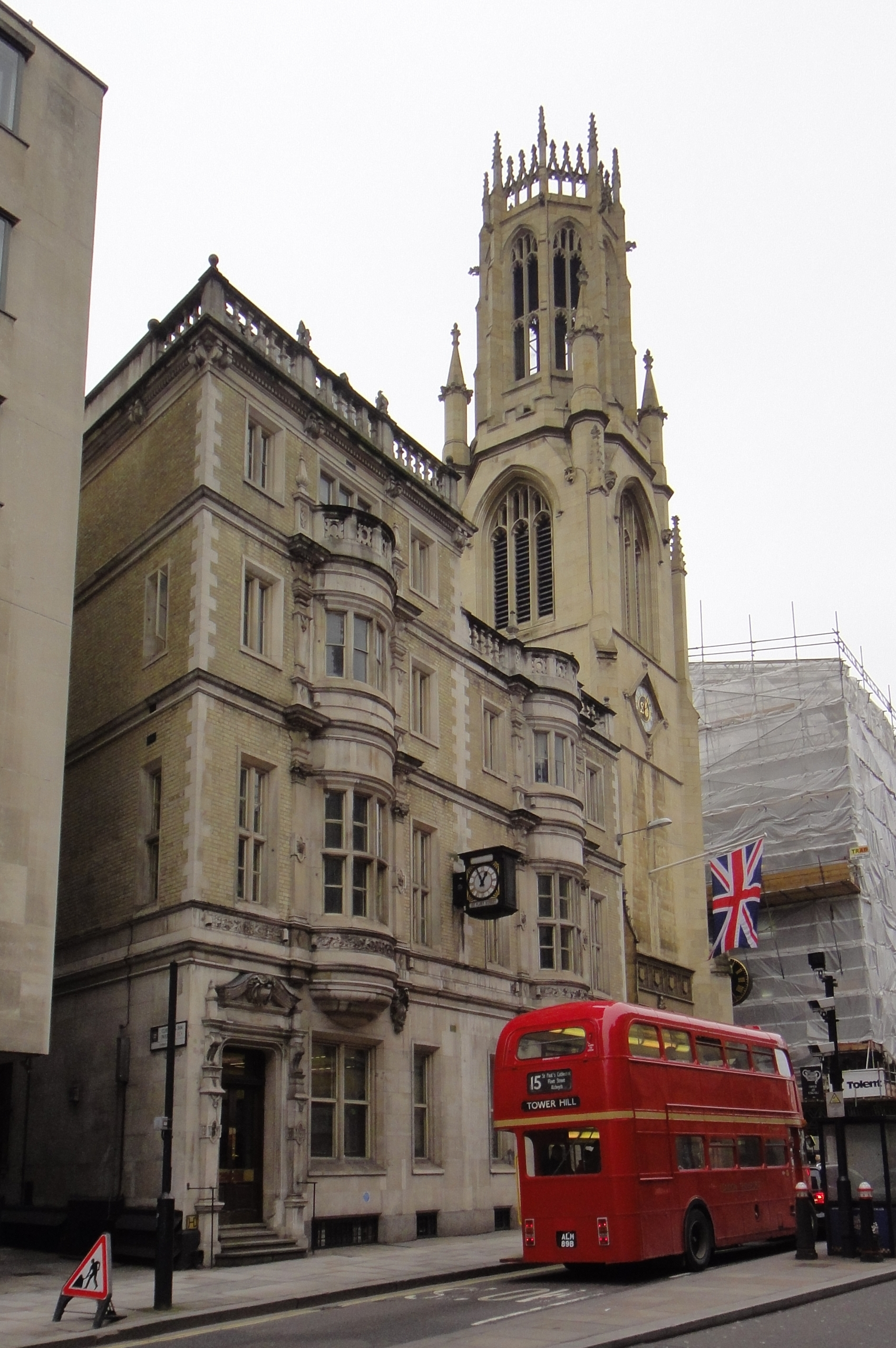
St Dunstan-in-the-West, one of the ward's historic churches.

=== Fleet Ditch and Farringdon Street ===
As well as goldsmiths, in medieval times the Fleet Ditch attracted many tanners and curriers to the ward. As the City became more populous, these trades were banished to the suburbs and by the 18th century the River Fleet had been culverted and built over. In its later years, the Fleet became little more than an open sewer, and the locality was given over to slums due to undesirable odours. The modern Farringdon Street was built over it, with the Fleet Market opening for the sale of meat, fish and vegetables in 1737. Charles Dickens described the market, in unflattering terms, in his novel Barnaby Rudge, set in 1780:

"Fleet Market, at that time, was a long irregular row of wooden sheds and penthouses, occupying the centre of what is now called Farringdon Street. They were jumbled together in a most unsightly fashion, in the middle of the road; to the great obstruction of the thoroughfare and the annoyance of passengers, who were fain to make their way, as they best could, among carts, baskets, barrows, trucks, casks, bulks, and benches, and to jostle with porters, hucksters, waggoners, and a motley crowd of buyers, sellers, pick–pockets, vagrants, and idlers. The air was perfumed with the stench of rotten leaves and faded fruit; the refuse of the butchers' stalls, and offal and garbage of a hundred kinds. It was indispensable to most public conveniences in those days, that they should be public nuisances likewise; and Fleet Market maintained the principle to admiration."

In 1829, it had become necessary to widen Farringdon Street, and the market was moved to new premises at Farringdon Market. This did not thrive, and its activities were moved to West Smithfield.

== Politics ==
Farringdon Without is one of 25 wards in the City of London, each electing an Alderman to the Court of Aldermen and Commoners (the City equivalent of a Councillor) to the Court of Common Council of the City of London Corporation.

On 27 January 1769, the radical MP John Wilkes was elected Alderman for this ward, while a prisoner in Newgate Prison. This was after he had repeatedly been elected as a Member of Parliament and expelled from Parliament for "outlawry"; essentially for what was considered at the time "obscene and malicious libel" against, no less than, King George III. Later, Wilkes was elected Lord Mayor of London (1774–75).

Other famous Aldermen include scions of the Child, Hoare and Gosling banking families. Typefounder Vincent Figgins was a Common Councilman for the ward in the 1820s and 1830s, winning election against Henry Hunt in 1828. From 1901 to 1921 Carl Hentschel represented the ward.

The ward is currently represented by Alderman Gregory Jones QC (elected February 2017, Common Councilman 2013–17) and 10 Common Councilman (elected March 2017). Alderman Gregory Jones QC has appointed John Absalom as Deputy (North) and Edward Lord OBE as Deputy (South).

Freemen of the City of London are eligible to stand for election.

== See also ==
- Farringdon
- Farringdon station
- Fleet Street
- Alpheus Morton, Deputy Alderman for Farringdon Without (1882–1923)
