= River Effra =

Effra Brixton Creek, New River, The Wash
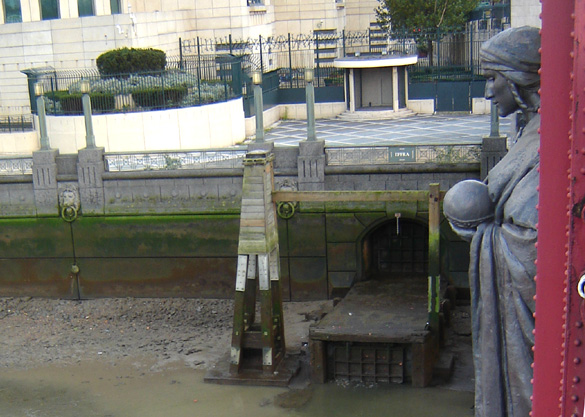
- Diverted overflow outlet of the Effra into the Thames, by Vauxhall Bridge, beneath Alfred Drury's sculpture of Science

Location
- Country: England
- Counties: Greater London

Physical characteristics
- Source
  - location: Upper Norwood Recreation Ground, Upper Norwood, London Borough of Croydon
  - coordinates: 51.4171°N 0.0914°W
- Mouth: River Thames
  - location: historically Walworth Marsh; outlet now at Vauxhall
  - coordinates: 51.4872°N 0.1257°W

Basin features
- Tributaries
  - right: Ambrook

The River Effra is a former stream or small river in south London, England, now culverted for most of its course. Once a tributary of the River Thames, flows from the Effra were incorporated in the Victorian era into a combined sewer draining much of the historic area of Peckham and Brixton.

== Etymology ==
The etymology of the name "Effra" has been much disputed. There is no evidence that it was applied to the stream before the late 18th century, and early 19th century gazetteers gave it no name. A map of 1744 refers to it as the "Shore", and it was also referred to as "Brixton Creek" and "the Wash". Unlikely suggestions for the name's origin include Ruskin's, that it was "shortened from [the Latin word] Effrena", that it was from a Celtic root "yfrid", or that it derived from Anglo-Saxon "efer", "bank", perhaps via "heah efre" ("high bank") recorded in a charter of 693 for a spot on the bank of the Thames.

A more recent suggestion is that the name is a corruption of the place-name "Heathrow", the name of a manor which once covered some 70 acres south of present day Coldharbour Lane and east of present day Effra Road. By the 1790s the land making up the Manor of Heathrow was known as Effra Farm. There is evidence that the name was first applied to the stream at Brixton, perhaps taken from the name of the farm, and was only later extended to the rest of its course. A 2016 book by the Lambeth borough archivist supports this view, suggesting that other etymologies are a product of 19th century antiquarianism.

== History ==
=== Before the 19th century ===
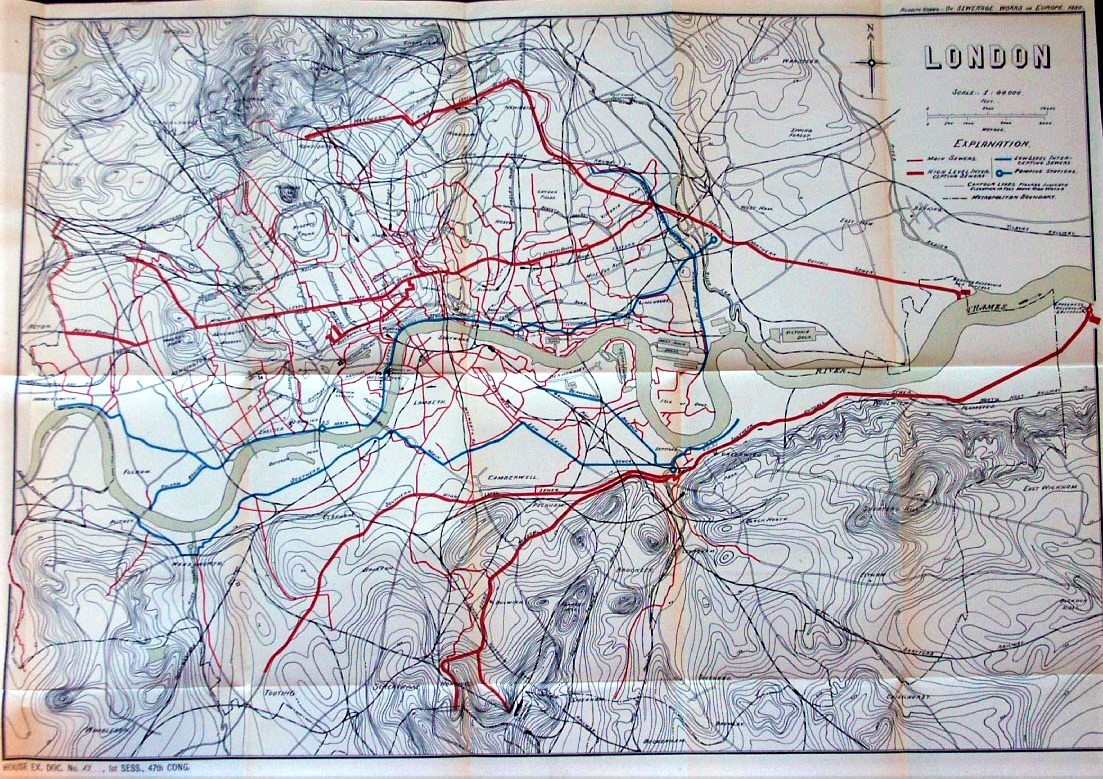
Excerpt from Hering's Sewerage in Europe map of 1882. The Norwood Ridge sits around the Effra Branch sewer, diverting east. The route of the replaced stream is two lateral sewers, partly for local lateral sewage, but otherwise for taking storm combined sewerage from the Effra Branch and Southern High and Low Level sewers to the Tideway.

The drainage basin of the stream covered around 20 square kilometres (8 sq miles) of present-day inner south London. Historically the Effra was fed partly by a line of springs that emerged at between 80 and 100 metres above sea level along the 5km ridge of the Great North Wood, where a layer of gravels overlies the impermeable London Clay. There were also springs at a lower level in Dulwich; the various tributaries met near Brixton before flowing to the Thames.

The lowest part of the river was diverted as early as the 13th century, after the monks of Bermondsey Priory made an agreement with neighbouring landowners to end flooding problems. Before that time the river's course ran either into Walworth Marsh, which after draining became Walworth Common, or into the Earl's Sluice to reach the Thames. The lower, northern part of the river appeared in Ogilby's Britannia of 1675 as the "New River". The last stretch of the diversion from Lambeth Marsh to the Thames just south of today's Vauxhall Bridge was also known as Effra Creek.

The upper, southern parts of the river became increasingly suburbanised as the 19th century went on. The art critic John Ruskin, who grew up at Herne Hill close to one of the Effra's tributaries, described "the good I got out of the tadpole-haunted ditch in Croxted Lane", and made an early sketch of a bridge over it.

Until about 1850 Brixton Road, where it ran along the course of the stream, was known as the "Washway", and the stream itself was often called the "Wash". By that time the Effra was heavily polluted with domestic waste, due to increasing development along its course, and by 1821 it was classed as an open sewer downstream of North Brixton. It still often flooded in heavy rain, and residents of Brixton Road and South Lambeth repeatedly complained of their houses being inundated. In 1847 the commissioners of the Surrey and East Kent Sewers, under the direction of surveyor Joseph Gwilt, carried out works "arching over" (culverting) the Effra as far upstream as Herne Hill.

=== Post-industrial revolution ===
When the London sewerage system was constructed during the mid-19th century, its designer Sir Joseph Bazalgette incorporated flows from the River Effra into the southern division of the system. The Effra Branch Sewer, about 3 miles in length and costing some £19,400 to construct, received much of the Effra's surface water and ran from the Norwood area into the Southern High Level Sewer at Croxted Lane. The Southern High Level itself ran from Herne Hill eastwards under Peckham and New Cross to Deptford. Here it joined the Southern Low Level Sewer, which picked up remaining effluent from the old course at Vauxhall and passed under Kennington and Burgess Park to Deptford; the two branches merging to form the Southern Outfall Sewer that runs underneath Greenwich and Woolwich to Crossness.

Most of the 13th century diversion were converted into culverts known as Effra Culvert that traveled northward and crossed the Southern High Level Sewer and the Southern Low Level Sewer before exiting to the Effra Creek which were still open water. Due to floods in the low lands of Battersea and Vauxhall, which were 6 to 8 feet (1.8 to 2.4 m) below the high water levels of the Thames, required a pumping station to be built in 1897 at the location near where the Effra Culvert and the Southern Low Level Sewer intercepted and it was used as the Effra Creek storm overflow.

As the area was increasingly urbanised, the remaining parts of the Effra's upper course were incorporated into the surface water drainage system, although some parts remained open and marked on Ordnance Survey maps until the later 19th century. The main course of the Effra remained as a sewer and culverts beneath Brixton Road, south London, and seen through a drainage grate in the crypts under St. Luke's Church, West Norwood, south London.

=== The 20th century and later ===
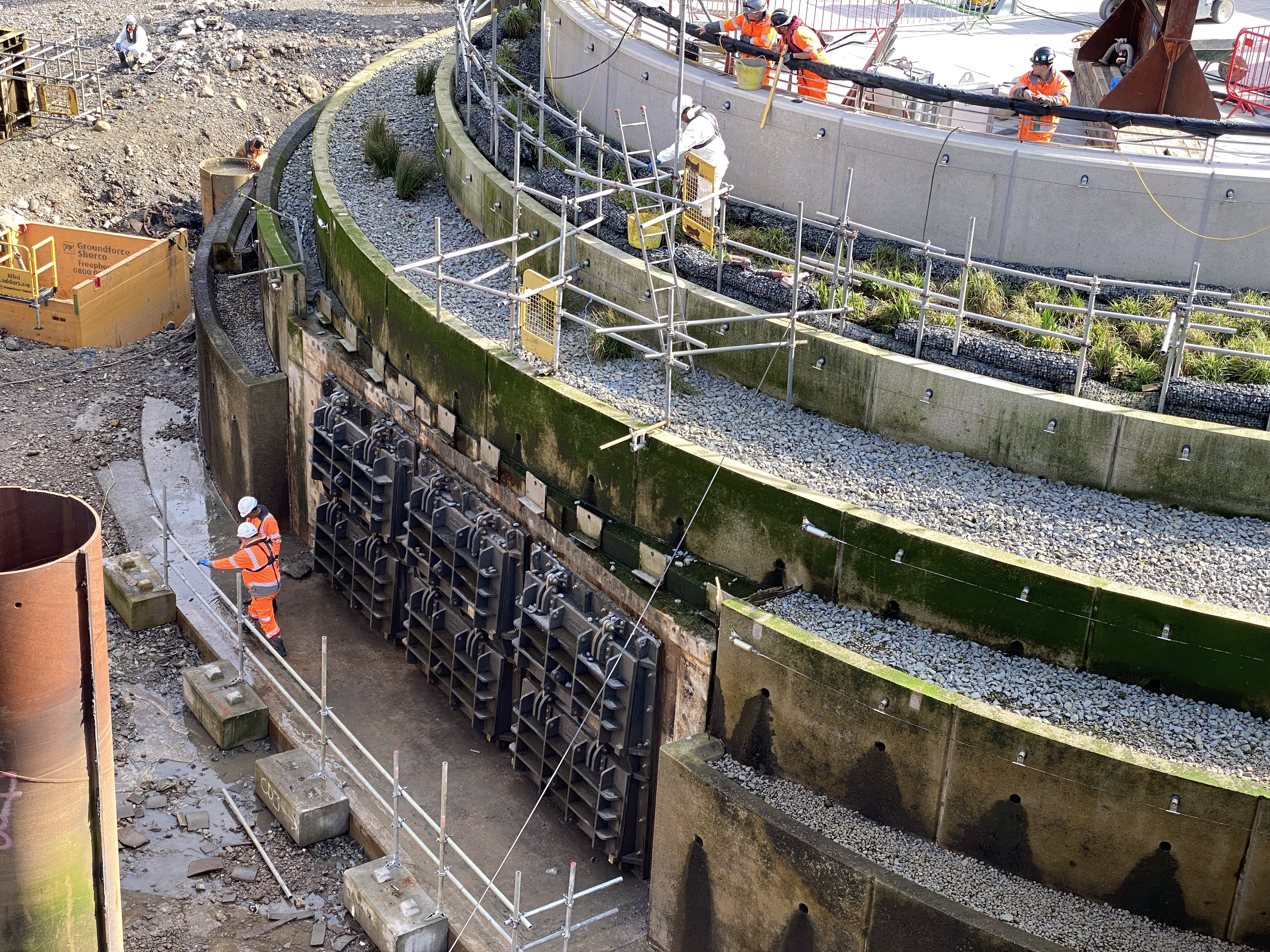
Effra CSO outfall at Isle of Effra during the construction

The combined sewer overflow (CSO) of the Effra followed the Brixton Storm Relief Sewer to discharge to the Thames at an outfall, called Brixton Storm Relief CSO, north of Vauxhall Bridge. A portion of Brixton Storm Relief Sewer was reconstructed in the 1970s around Brixton Road.

The outfall changed again with the construction of Thames Tideway Tunnel in the 2020s. An interception chamber was built into the Thames at Albert Embankment in front of Brixton Storm Relief CSO to intercept the effluence into the Tideway Tunnel. In the event of a sewer overflow, the Effra effluence could still be discharged to the Thames through a new outfall in front of the interception chamber, called Effra CSO. The top of the interception chamber was covered and landscaped for public access. It is now called Isle of Effra.

== Course ==
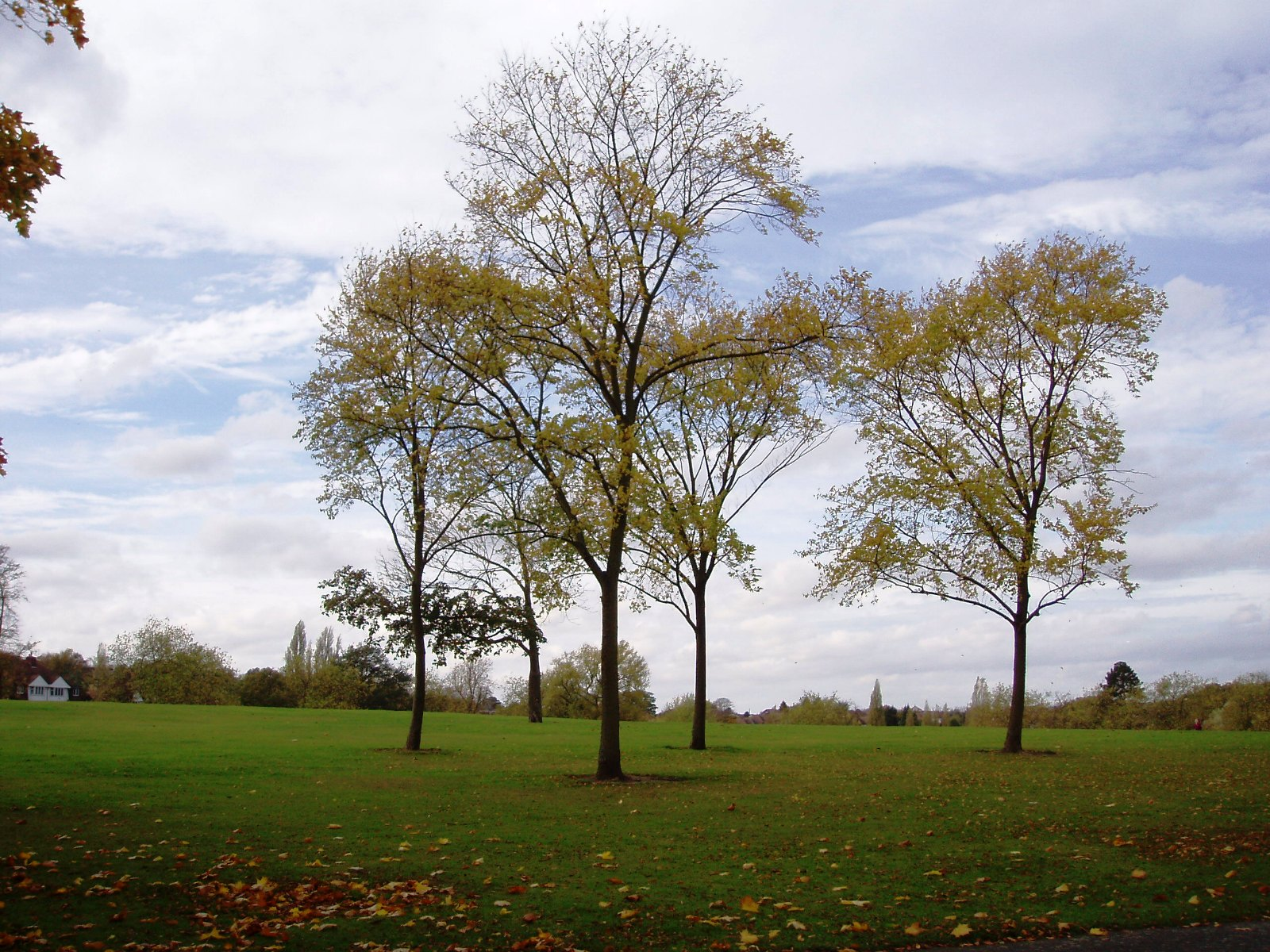
The Upper Norwood Recreation Ground, source of the main tributary of the Effra.

The river was fed by several tributaries which met above Brixton. The main branch of the Effra rises near Harold Road in Upper Norwood Recreation Ground, and flows through West Norwood. Where Norwood High Street merges at the fountain with the A215 to form Norwood Road, it was joined by a small tributary from Knights Hill ward.

A second branch rose south of Gipsy Hill and ran into West Dulwich via Croxted Road, after flowing from near the Westow House inn, (Note: A public house at the south-west corner of Crystal Palace) Westow Hill. Beyond the Paxton pub opposite the end of Gipsy Hill its culvert captures water from Hamilton Road, forms the back garden line of Croxted Road and joins the other tributary at the South Circular Road, where it now forms the sewers of Croxted Road, Dulwich Road, Dalberg Road, Effra Road, Electric Lane, and Brixton Road.

East along the watershed, springs rose in Dulwich Wood, flowing through Belair Park and beneath North Dulwich to Herne Hill. Still further to the east a tributary called the Ambrook rose from springs in Sydenham Hill Wood and Peckarmans Wood, flowing to Herne Hill through present-day Dulwich Park, where its heavily landscaped channel is visible. The longest and easternmost tributary ran from Eliot Bank and Horniman Park in Forest Hill down to Herne Hill. Rocque's map of 1746 called these confluences around Herne Hill railway station "Island Green". Most of these tributaries are no longer visible above ground: an exception is the Ambrook, which still flows seasonally in Sydenham Hill Wood.

The Effra flowed generally NNW until it reached its lower course, north of Brixton. At this point it turned northeast and then east, running through the grounds of Bermondsey Priory. It fed Lambeth and possibly Walworth Marshes, and may have joined the Earl's Sluice, which entered the Thames at Deptford Wharf. After diversion in the 13th century, it ran directly west from Kennington to join the Thames at Vauxhall.

== Folklore ==
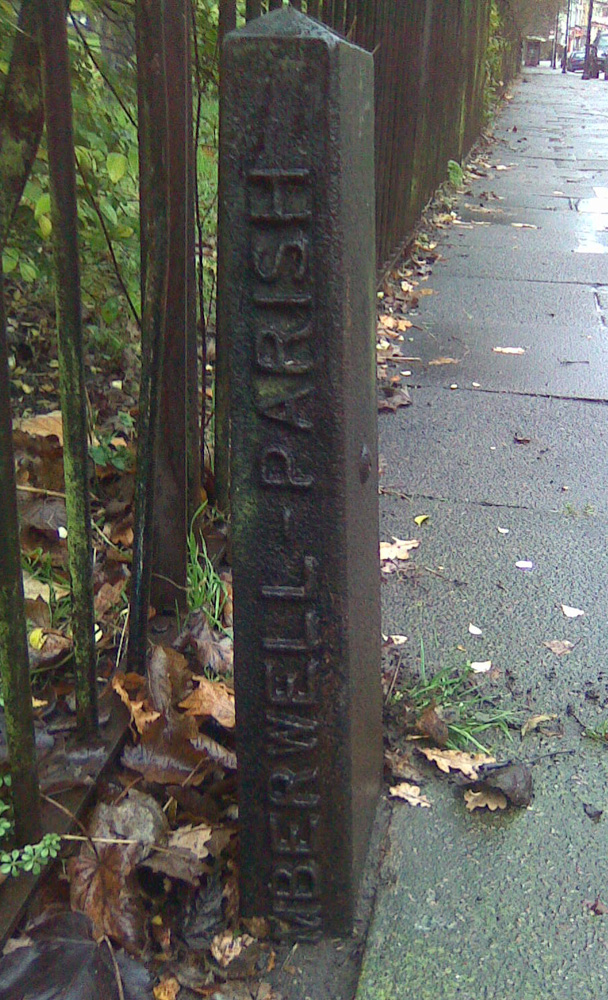
Boundary marker for Camberwell Parish on the course of the Effra at Gipsy Hill, where the watercourse was rediscovered in the 1920s.

A local story tells of a coffin found floating down the Thames in Victorian times, which was traced back to West Norwood Cemetery. (Note: Under which goes the first-mentioned high source of the Effra in the south of the illustration at the Walbrook River website from the book N. Barton's Lost Rivers) Cemetery staff were puzzled to find that the plot the coffin had come from was undisturbed. Further investigation revealed that the ground beneath the grave had subsided, and the entire coffin had fallen into the underground Effra river, floating downstream to Vauxhall and entering the Thames. The song “Down in the Effra” by British folk band The Effras was written about this account.

== Flooding ==
Although little more than a stream in the south, until 1935 the culverted watercourse flooded during heavy rains every decade or so; an inscription on a white stone tablet high up the side of a building in Elder Road, West Norwood reads: "FLOOD LEVEL 17th July 1890".

After a three-hour-long storm on Sunday 14 June 1914 the sewer overflowed again and flooded houses along its path from Elder Road to Chestnut Road, and locals were forced to evacuate their homes for several days. Further floods in the 1920s prompted works to enlarge the sewer. This was sufficient until a small part of the local area was flooded again during a powerful downpour on 20 July 2007.

== The Unearthing the Effra Campaign ==
In 1992 a project by the London arts group Platform sparked a local campaign to dig up the river. The Unearthing the Effra project was based around a mock Effra Redevelopment Agency, which included a public office. The project gained publicity in local newspapers and radio stations before the journalists noticed that the group had scattered, the whole thing being a stunt carried out in the name of art.

== See also ==
- Tributaries of the River Thames
- Subterranean rivers of London
- List of rivers of England

== Notes and references ==
Notes

References

- Referred to in John Constantine Hellblazer 238 as a gateway to "shadow London"

Next confluence upstream	River Thames	Next confluence downstream
Tyburn (stream) (north)	River Effra	River Fleet (north)
