= Muswell =

Muswell may refer to:

== Places ==
=== United Kingdom ===
- Muswell Hill, Buckinghamshire
- Muswell Hill, London
- Muswell Stream, London
