= Subterranean rivers of London =

Geographical feature of England

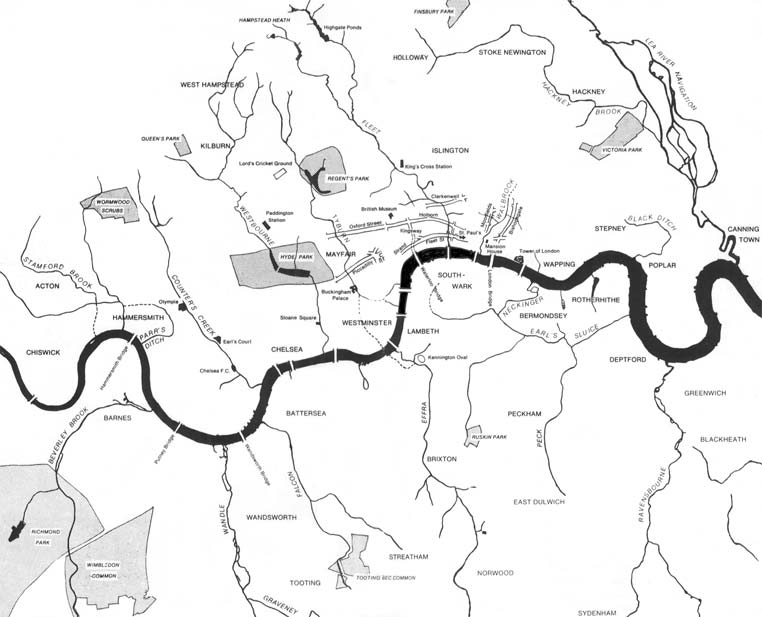
A sketch map of some lost rivers

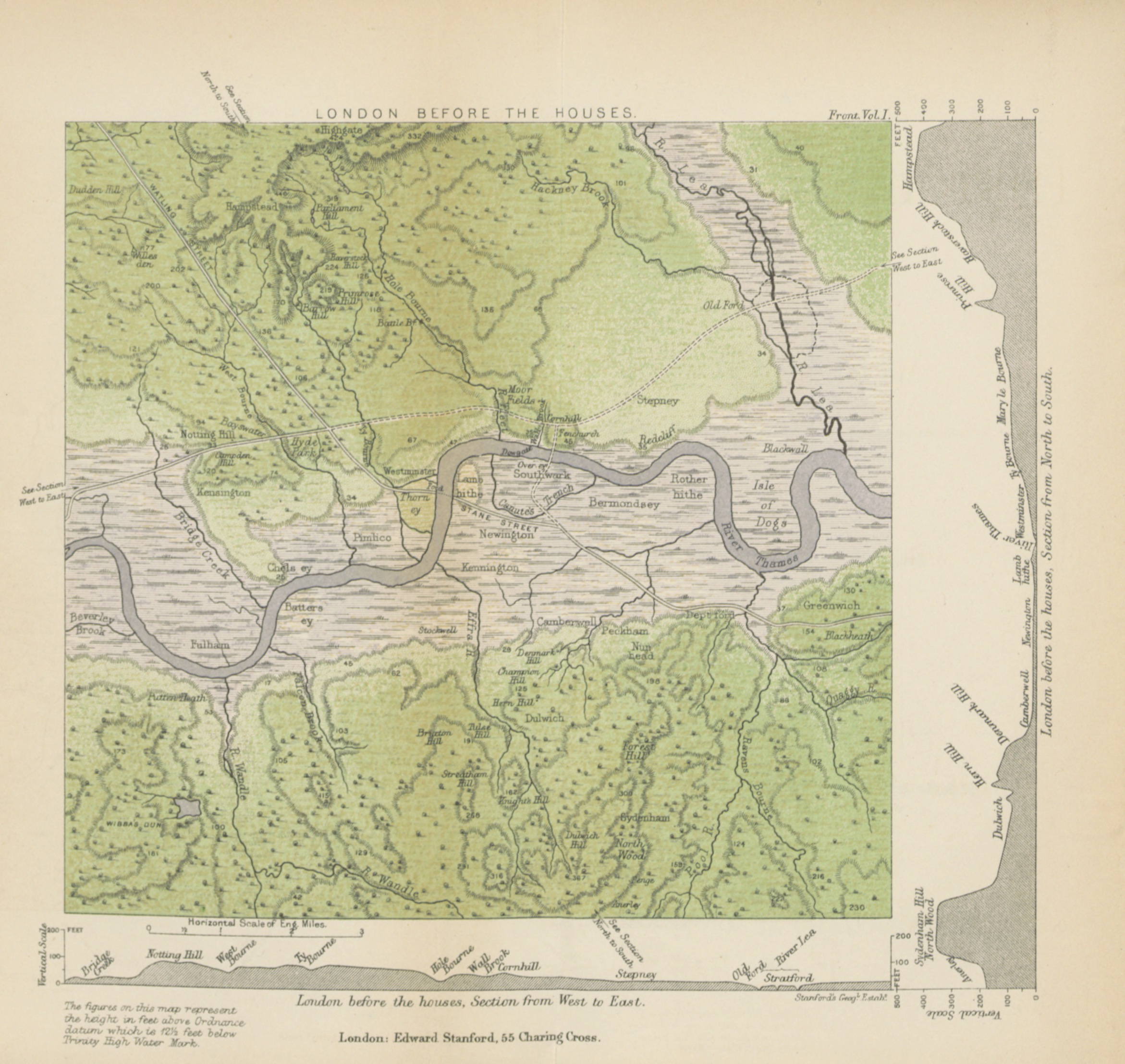
"London Before the Houses", map of pre-urban London from 1884

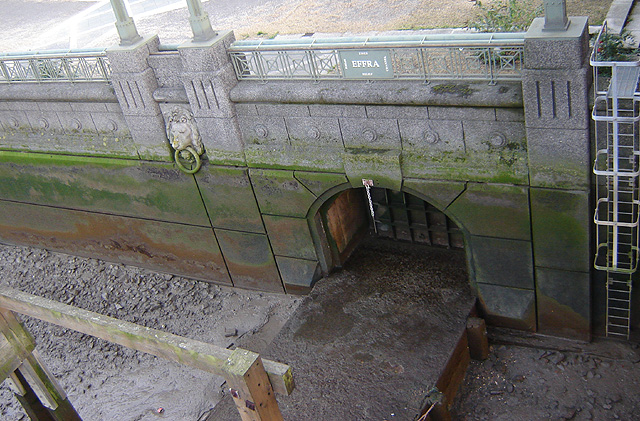
The position of a mouth of the Effra in the 13th century

The subterranean or underground rivers of London are or were the direct or indirect tributaries of the upper estuary of the Thames (the Tideway) that were built over during the growth of the metropolis of London. They now flow through culverts, with some of them integral parts of London's sewerage system and diverted accordingly.

== North of the Thames ==
From west to east – sub-tributaries are shown indented

- River Brent (partially underground)
- Stamford Brook
- Parrs Ditch
- Counter's Creek
- River Westbourne
  - Tyburn Brook
- River Tyburn
- River Fleet, (following Farringdon Street, New Bridge Street and other roads).
  - Lamb's Conduit
  - Fagswell Brook (Follows the course of Charterhouse Street)
- River Walbrook
- Lorteburn or Langbourne (now dry)
- Brook at Nightingale Lane
- Black Ditch
- Muswell Stream (sub-sub-tributary via Pymmes Brook and the River Lea)
- River Moselle (subtributary via the Lea)
- Hackney Brook (subtributary via the Lea)
- Ham Creek
- River Rom (partially underground)

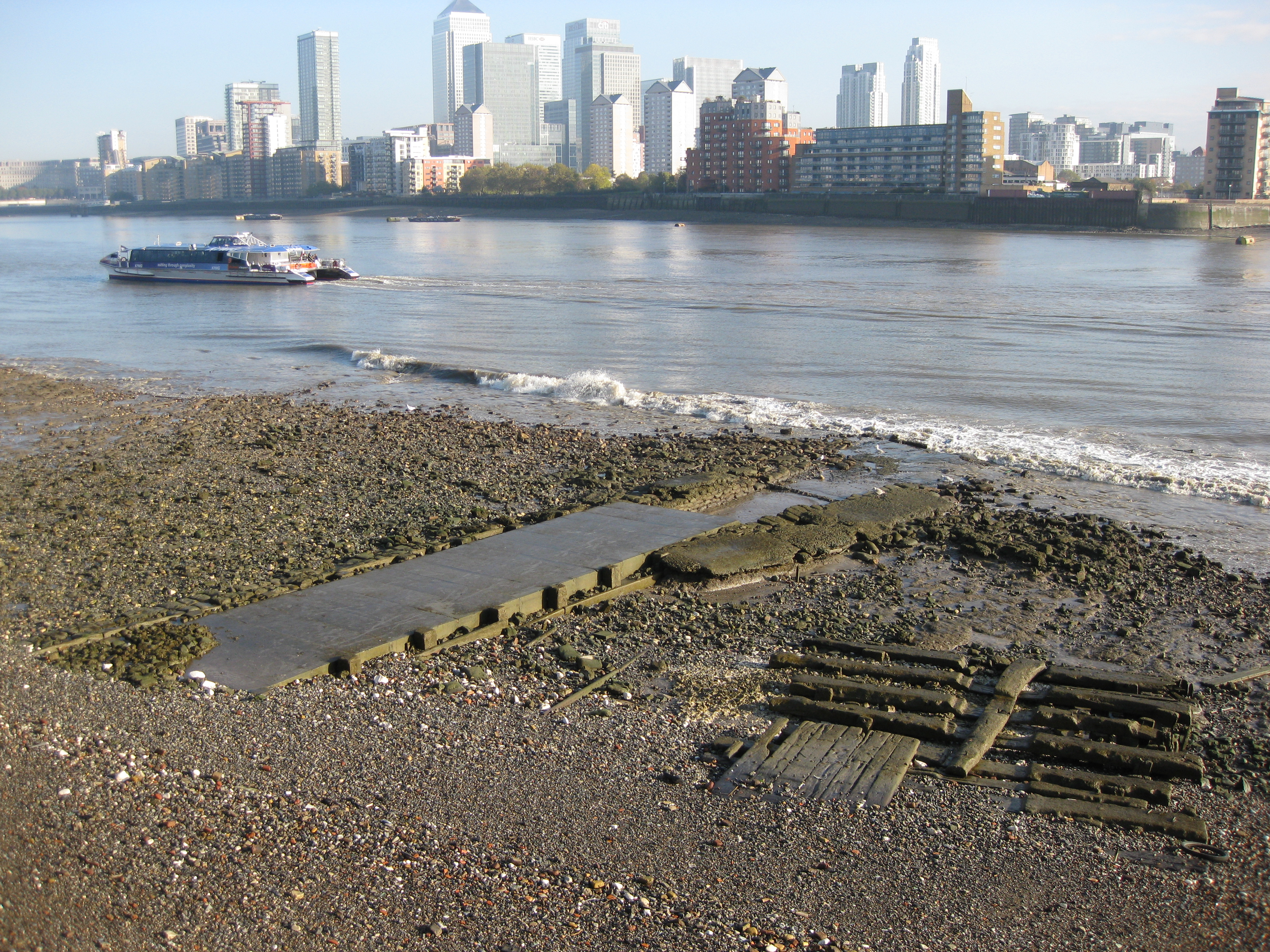
The culverted mouth of the Earl's Sluice at Deptford Wharf

== South of the Thames ==
From west to east – sub-tributaries are shown indented

- Sudbrook (partially underground)
- Beverley Brook (partially underground)
- Graveney (sub tributary of River Wandle)
  - Norbury Brook
- Falconbrook
- River Effra
- River Neckinger
- Earl's Sluice
  - River Peck
- River Quaggy (partially underground) (sub tributary of River Ravensbourne)
- Wogebourne
- Heathwall Ditch

== Development ==
In June 2008, the office of Mayor of London published outline plans to reinstate some underground rivers. In January 2009, a partnership among the Environment Agency, Natural England, The River Restoration Centre, and the Greater London Authority set out a strategy for putting this into effect by creating the London Rivers Action Plan.

== See also ==
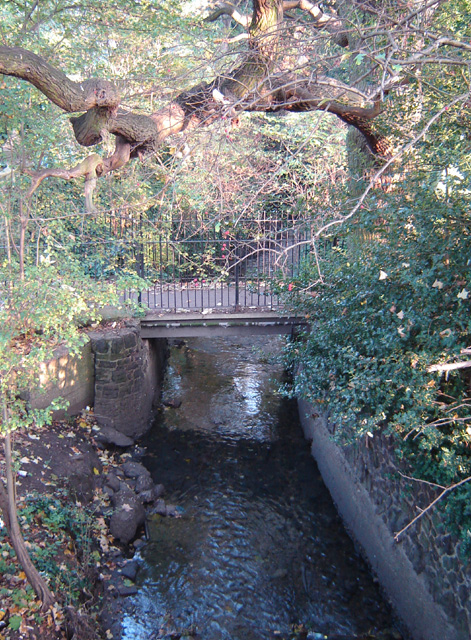
The Moselle on the surface flows through Tottenham Cemetery on its way to the Lea

- Blue Ribbon Network—the major waterways of London
- List of rivers of England
- Subterranean London
- Subterranean river
- Tributaries of the River Thames
