= Herne Tavern =

Pub in East Dulwich, London, England

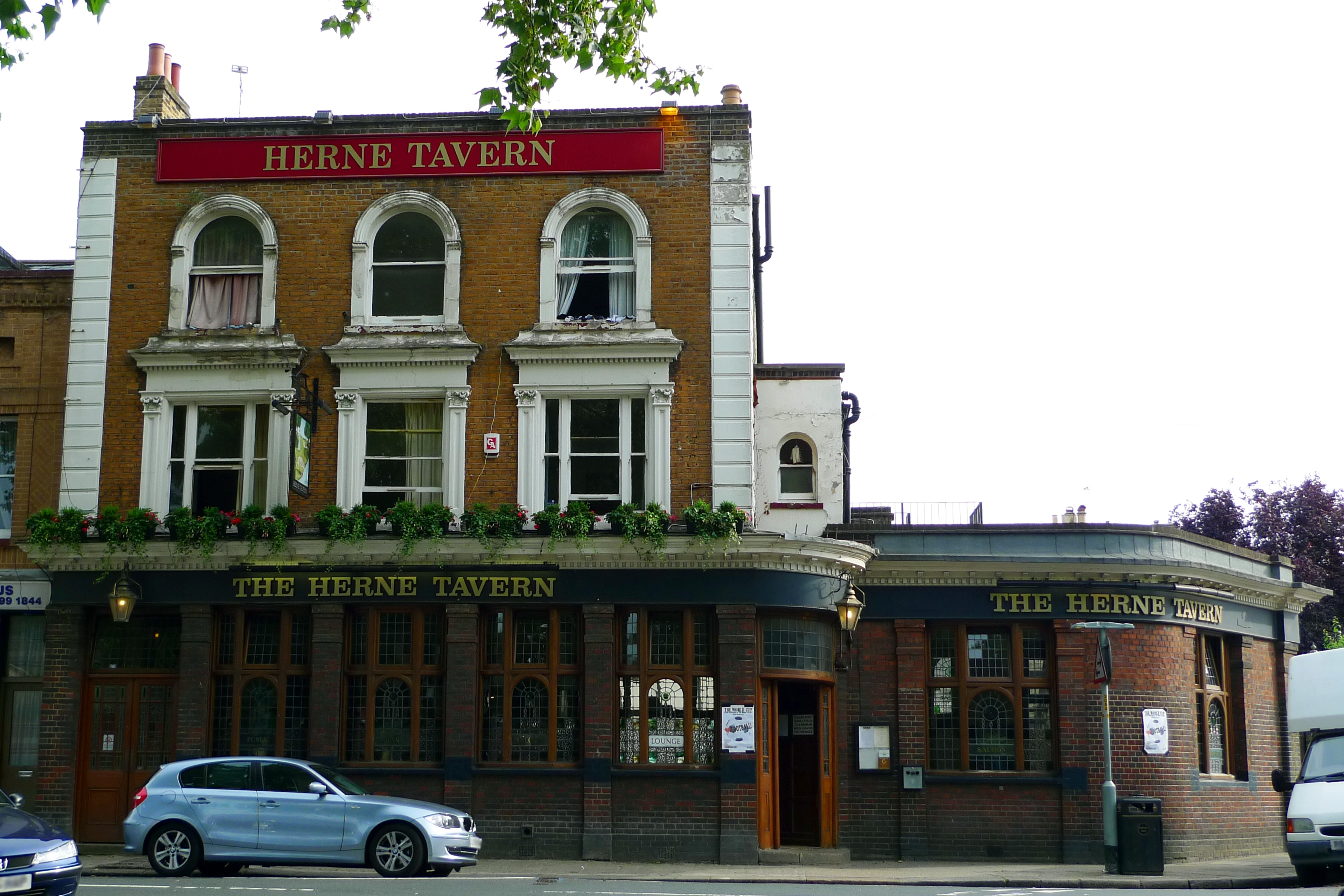
- The pub in 2010

General information
- Type: Public house
- Location: 2 Forest Hill Road, East Dulwich, London, England
- Coordinates: 51.4534°N 0.0623°W
- Year built: Mid-19th century
- Renovated: 1930s (remodelled)
- Owner: Heineken UK

Website
- Official website

The Herne Tavern is a public house on Forest Hill Road in East Dulwich, south London, England, close to the boundary with Honor Oak. Although built in the mid-19th century, its interior was extensively remodelled during the interwar period and remains largely unaltered. The pub's interior is included on CAMRA's National Inventory of Historic Pub Interiors and is rated three stars, denoting "outstanding national historic importance".

== History ==
The public house was built in the mid-19th century, but the interior was remodelled in the interwar period and has remained largely unaltered since.

It was included on the Campaign for Real Ale (CAMRA)'s National Inventory of Historic Pub Interiors before the inventory's grading system was revised. Under the revised scheme, it is rated three stars and its interior is regarded as being "of outstanding national historic importance". In 2024, the pub was acquired by Urban Pubs & Bars. As of August 2026, the freehold was owned by Heineken UK and the pub was operated by Urban Pubs & Bars.

== Architecture ==
=== Exterior ===
The upper floors retain a traditional Victorian appearance, contrasting with a remodelled ground floor featuring decorative brickwork and leaded windows. The 1930s alterations also included a large extension on the right-hand side. Distinctive leaded and dimpled-glass windows incorporate surviving signage for the former public rooms, including "Public Bar", "Saloon Lounge" and "Lounge". To the rear is a substantial beer garden extending beyond the main building.

=== Interior ===
The interior retains its historic three-room layout arranged around a central island bar, although the original connecting doors between the rooms have been removed. Features surviving from the 1930s refurbishment include half-height timber wall panelling, the bar counter in its original position, black-and-white tiled detailing at its base, and a number of distinctive Art Deco-style chairs with sweeping armrests. The former public bar also contains tiled fireplaces decorated with images of sailing vessels. At the rear of the pub, a former stable block known as the Barn stands above the culverted River Peck, with a glass panel installed in the floor to mark the river's course.

== See also ==
- List of pubs in London
