= River Peck =

River in Greater London, England

Coordinates: 51.4581°N 0.0588°W

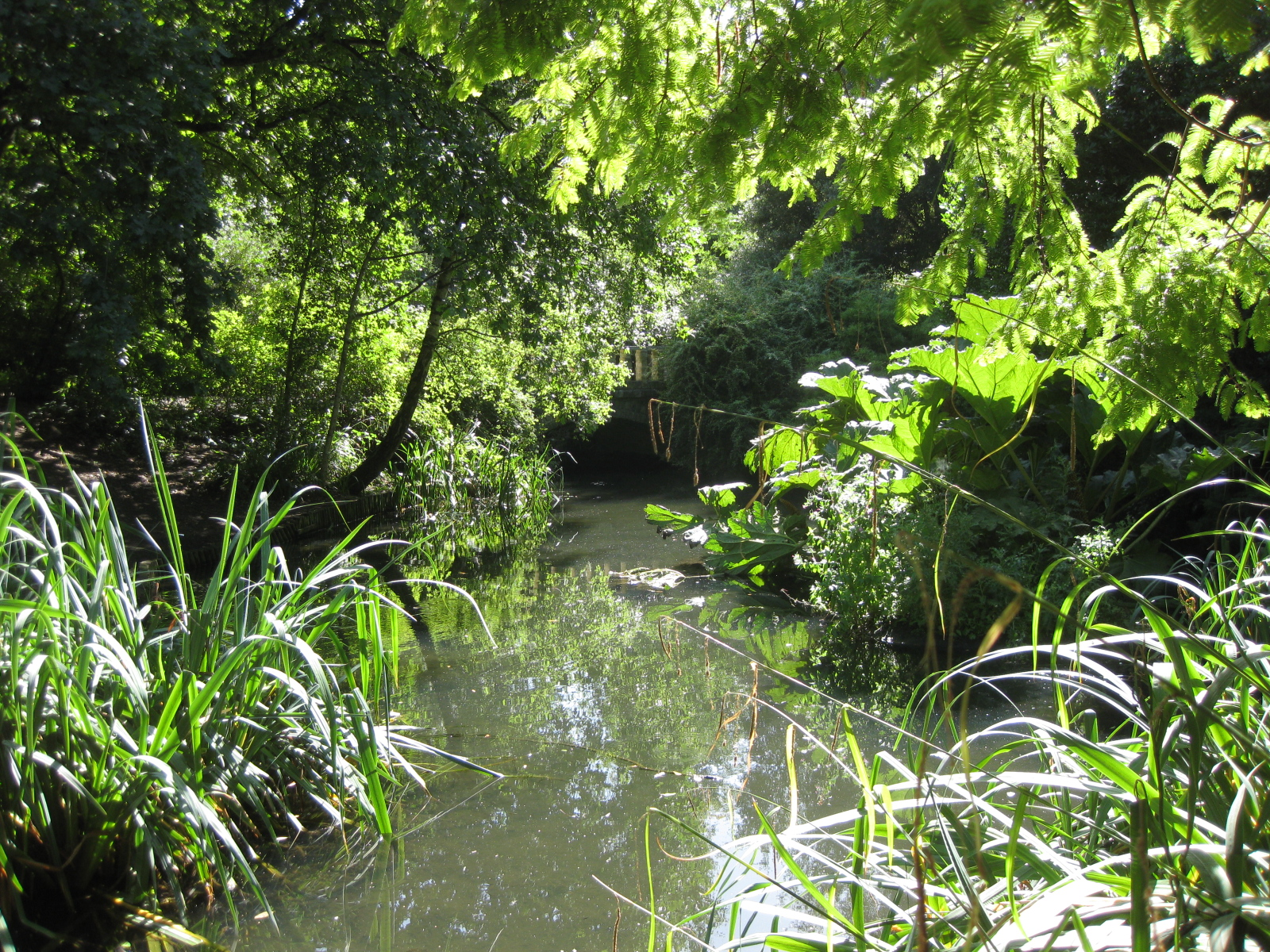
The River Peck in the Japanese Garden, Peckham Rye park

The River Peck is a small stream in London that was enclosed in 1823. The stream daylights on the west side of Peckham Rye Park.

In South Bermondsey it flows into the Earl's Sluice which has its confluence with the Thames at Deptford Wharf. Peckham means "homestead of the Peck".

== See also ==
- Subterranean rivers of London
