= Peckham Rye =

Coordinates: 51.457804°N 0.061047°W

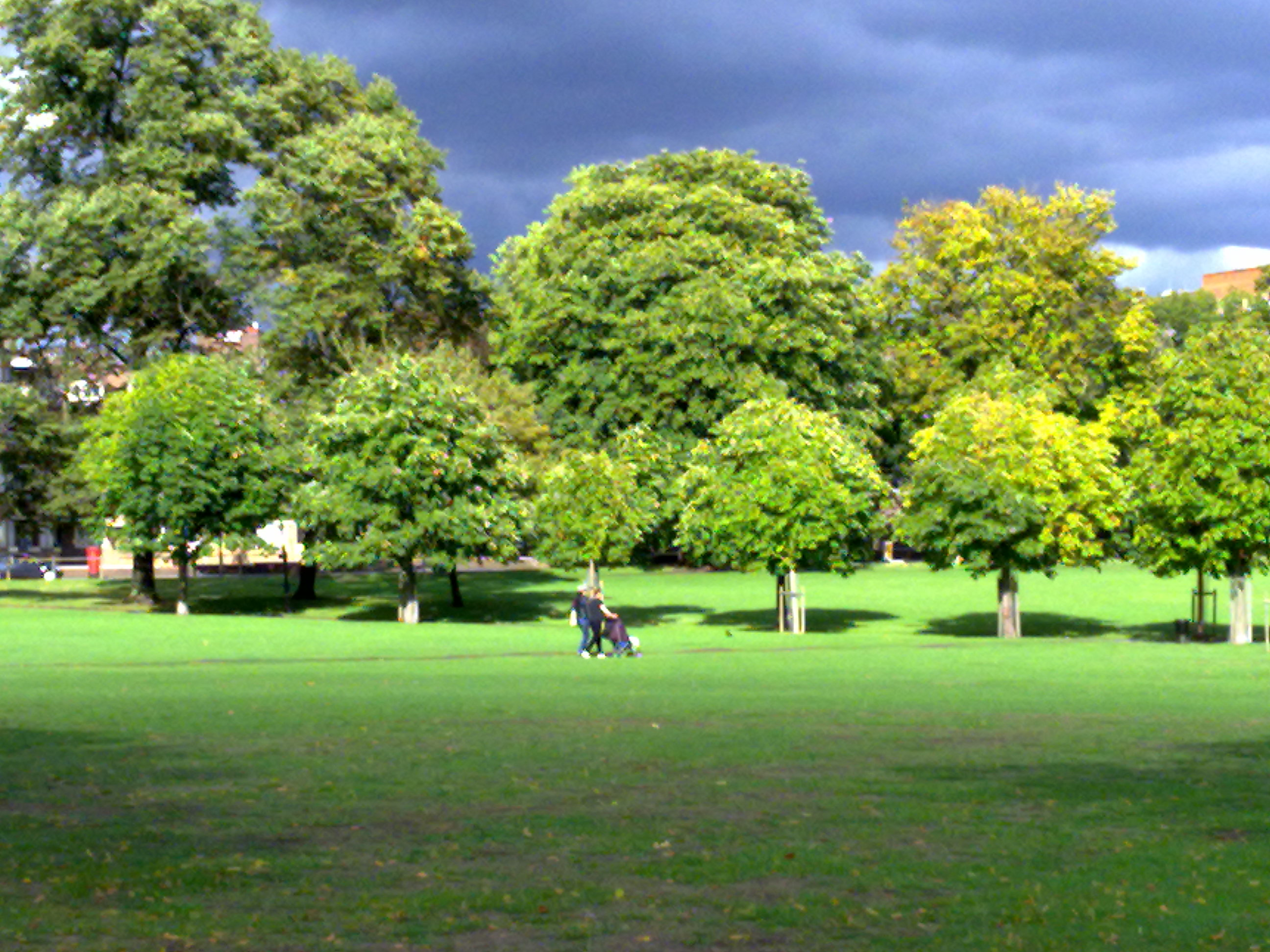
- Peckham Rye Common

- Location within Greater London
- London borough: Southwark
- Ceremonial county: Greater London
- Region: London
- Country: England
- Sovereign state: United Kingdom
- Police: Metropolitan
- Fire: London
- Ambulance: London
- London Assembly: Lambeth and Southwark

Peckham Rye is an open space and road in the London Borough of Southwark, London, England. The roughly triangular open space lies to the south of Peckham and consists of two contiguous areas, Peckham Rye Common to the north and Peckham Rye Park to the south. The road forms the western and eastern perimeter of the open space.

Peckham Rye is also a ward of the London Borough of Southwark, and forms part of the Lewisham West and East Dulwich constituency, with its northern part in Peckham.

== Location ==
Peckham Rye railway station on Rye Lane is a short distance north of the open space in Peckham. To the east is Nunhead, to the south is Honor Oak and to the west is East Dulwich. Barry Road connects the Rye with Dulwich Library while Friern Road is named after an old friary.

== History ==
A map showing the Rye ward of Camberwell Metropolitan Borough as it appeared in 1916

It was on the Rye in the 1760s that the artist William Blake claimed to have seen visions. According to Blake's biographer Alexander Gilchrist, his first vision was one of "a tree filled with angels, bright angelic wings bespangling every bough like stars."

The Park includes the 49 acres of land south of the Common that surrounded Homestall Farm, which was purchased by the Vestry and London County Council in 1868, for £51,000. A few other small parcels of land were later incorporated into the Park when the leases of Homestall Farm and other properties expired.

The land for Peckham Rye Park was purchased by the London County Council for £51,000 (equivalent to £5,700,000 in 2025) and declared open on 14 May 1894. At that time the park was 54 acres (220,000 m^{2}). Homestall Farm was 13 acres. One of the first features of the new park, an ornamental 'Old English Garden' was created. It was later renamed the 'Sexby Garden' after Lt-Col J. J. Sexby the London County Council's first Chief Officer of Parks. It was re-developed in 1936 and the paths re-laid with yorkstone paving.

During World War II, part of the Common became a camp for Italian prisoners of war.

The River Peck was largely enclosed in 1823. Today, parts of this stream can still be seen on the west side of Peckham Rye Park.

The Park includes a Japanese garden and hosts a weekly Parkrun event.

== Local landmarks ==
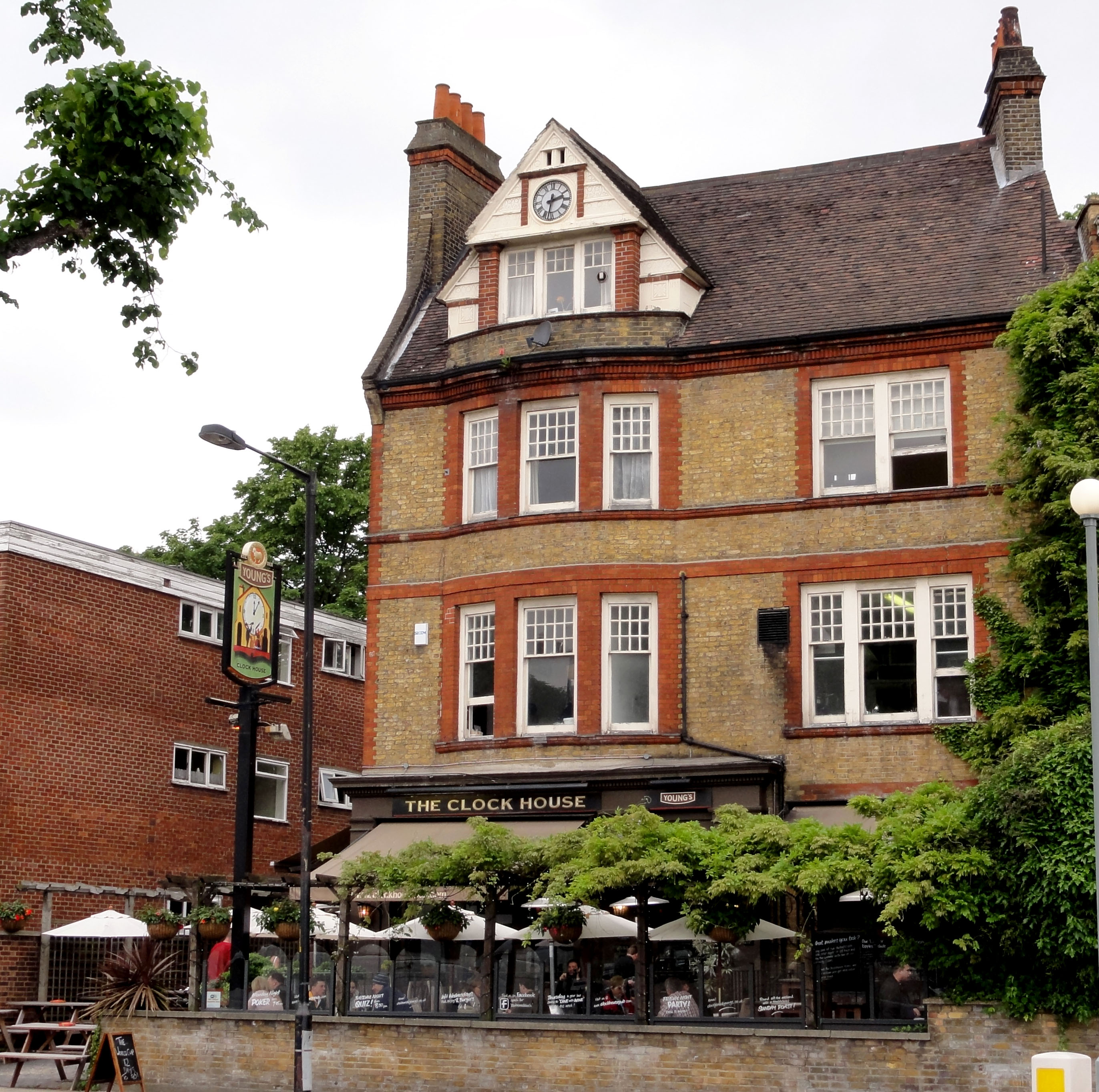
The Clock House pub on Peckham Rye

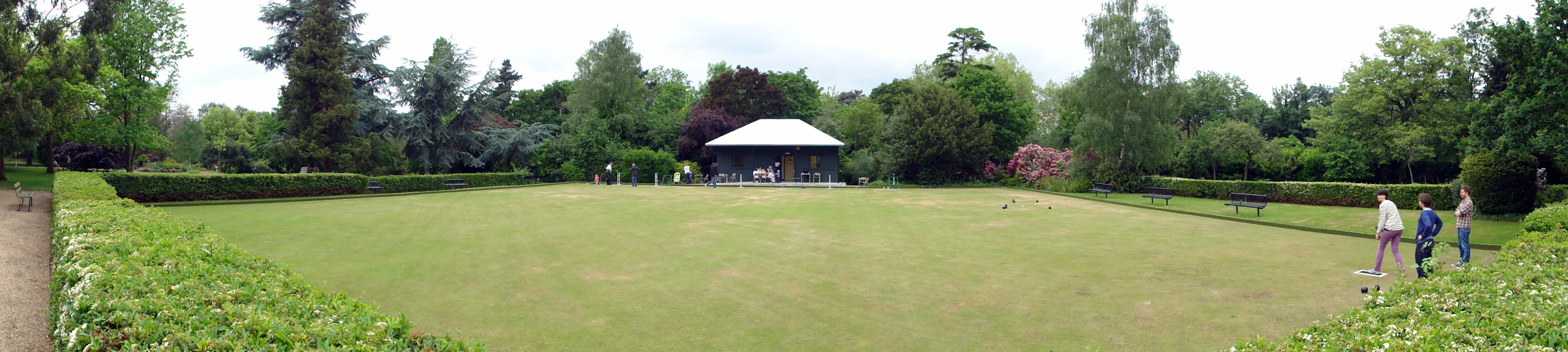
The Peckham Rye bowling green (panorama)

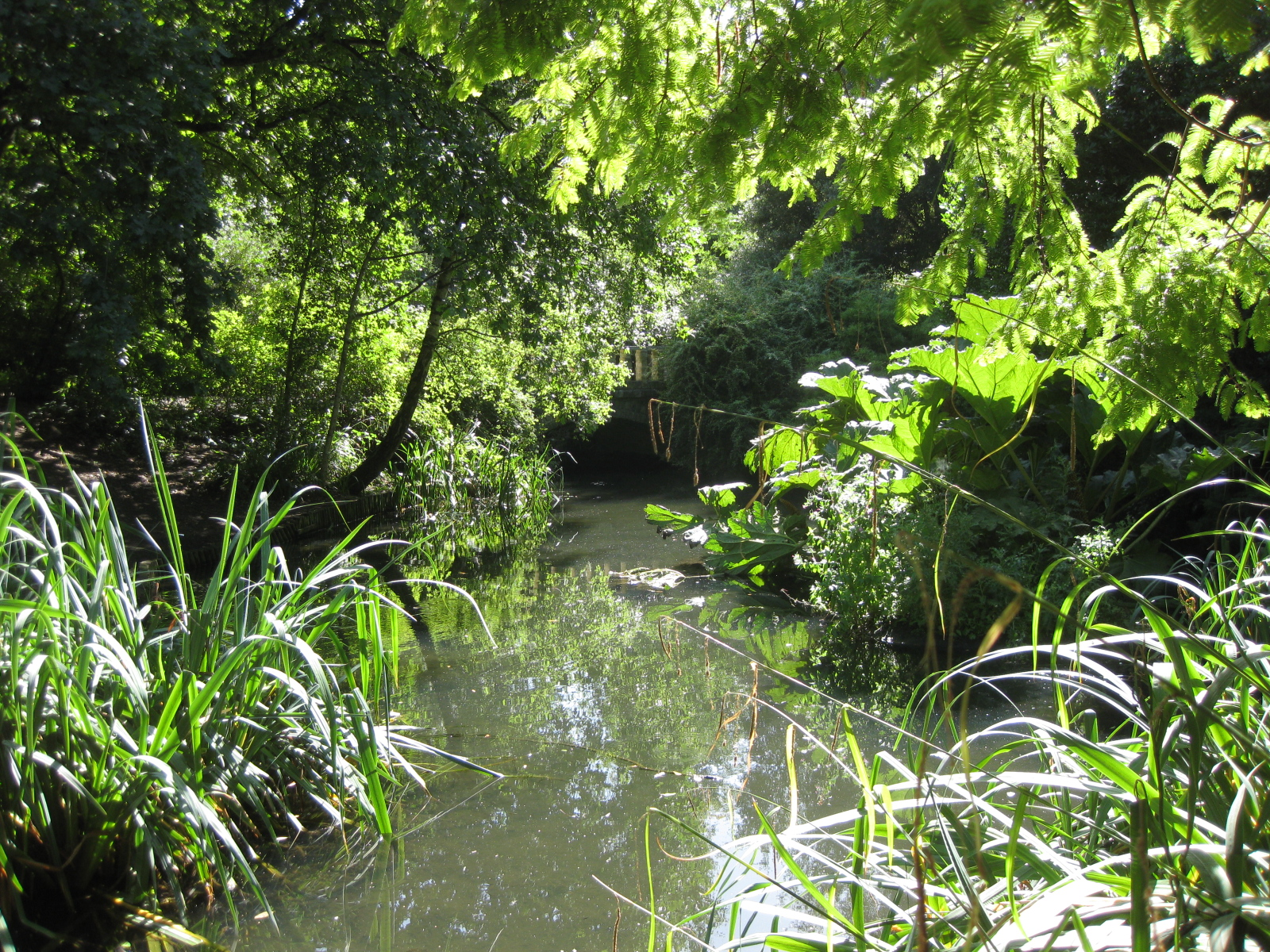
River Peck in Peckham Rye park

== Cultural references ==
Peckham Rye is also Cockney rhyming slang for tie (necktie).

Muriel Spark's 1960 novel The Ballad of Peckham Rye tells the story of a Scotsman moving to the area.

The 2019 film Blue Story makes many references to Peckham, and in particular Peckham Rye when talking about the location of rival gangs and gang warfare in the area.
