= Lorteburn =

Lost river in the City of London

The Lorteburn or Langbourne is a lost stream or river, which ran in the east of the City of London, arising near to Aldgate, flowing south near to the Tower of London, and discharging into the River Thames. The stream appears to have been covered over or dry by the early 14th century but its course has been discovered during archaeological digs in the area and the watershed can be traced in the street level contours of that part of the city as mapped by Kelsey in 1841. The stream gave its name to the Langbourn ward of the city. The river is seldom included on maps or lists of London's lost rivers, and its existence is denied by Nicholas Barton, in his 1962 book Lost Rivers of London, but in more recent work David Bentley argues for its existence.

== Toponymy ==
The name Lorteburn is attested in a deed of 1288, when the stream was still extant. The name Langbourne is attested in Stow in 1603, when it had been dry for nearly two centuries.

In English River Names, Eilert Ekwall identifies several instances of Lorteburn. He gives the derivation as from an Old English word meaning dirt or filth. Related to the Old Norse lortr ("excrement, faeces"), this implies a dirty or filthy stream, possibly one used for a sewer.

There is a second possibility given by Ekwall, a derivation from either the brook name Hlōra, or the mythical Norse female name Hlóra. The brook name derived from the Old English hlōwan meaning "The roaring one". This implies a swift stream with foaming water. This derivation may seem unlikely given the short length of the stream, but the watercourse was steep, and 'roaring' does correspond with Stow's description.

Burn or Bourne is a standard name for smaller streams and river, common in the area of London, for example the nearby rivers Ravensbourne, Tyburn and Westbourne. In place names it normally means 'stream'.

== Archaeological evidence ==
In 1981, David Bentley assembled evidence for the stream's existence, relying on archaeological and map evidence, especially in the records of the Museum of London. He first points out there is a shallow linear valley in that part of the city, first identified by Richard Kelsey's topographical survey in 1841. The topography of this part of London has been changed almost beyond recognition since the 1841 survey, especially by the construction of the London, Tilbury and Southend Railway and its terminus at Fenchurch Street railway station, and thus this valley can no longer be seen in the modern contours.

Bentley then goes on to provide detailed evidence for the Lorteburn's existence. Archaeological evidence has identified dried stream beds in this part of the city. Discoveries include:

- Mariner House, Crutched Friars (Peter Marsden 1963-4) a small stream in the natural gravels, on an east to west alignment.
- 2-4 Jewry Street (Peter Rowsome 1980) a stream in a section cutting through the natural brickearth, on a north to south alignment.
- Rangoon Street (David Bowler 1982) two stream-beds were observed following differing courses.

Bentley interprets this evidence as "a stream called the Lorteburn recorded east of Seething Lane in the late 13th century."

== Early references ==
Bentley has identified that:

A reference in the Husting Roll to a property described in relation to a stream in Seething Lane provides more tangible evidence that a water-course continued into medieval times. A deed of 1288(?) refers to a property within the parish of All Hallows' Barking which adjoined a street to the west and a stream, called Lorteburn, to the east. Other deeds of the same period show that the street was Seething Lane, and that the Lorteburn must therefore have flowed along a course east of, and more or less parallel to, the Lane

— Bentley (1984)

A very different course is described in 1603 by John Stow, giving the name as 'Langborne' and describing the route as running along Fenchurch Street, Lombard Street, and Sherbourn Lane. Stow states that the river gave its name to the Langbourn ward of the City of London. The stream was either covered over or dry by his time.

Langborne.; Shareborne lane. Langbourne ward. Langborne water, so called of the length thereof, was a great streame breaking out of the ground, in Fen Church street, which ran downe with a swift course, west, through that streete, thwart Grastreete, and downe Lumbard streete, to the west ende of S. Marie Wolnothes Church, and then turning the course South down Shareborne lane, so termed of sharing or diuiding, it brake into diuerse rilles or rillets to the Riuer of Thames: of this bourne that warde took the name, and is till this day called Langborne warde. This Bourne also is long since stopped vp at the head, and the rest of the course filled vp and paued ouer, so that no signe thereof remayneth more then the names aforesaid.

— A Survey of London. Reprinted From the Text of 1603 By John Stow Edited by C L Kingsford.

In 1770 John Noorthouck gives a similar description to Stow, with some additional details.

Near Magpie-alley adjoining to the church of St. Catherine Coleman in Aldgate-ward was antiently a spring that produced a rivulet or bourn, which ran down the street westward, and through Lombard-street as far as the church of St. Mary Woolnoth. Here parting into several shares, or rills, and turning Southward, it left a name to Share-bourn-lane, or South-bourn-lane from its running southward to the Wallbrook, uniting with which it ran to the Thames. By this stream spreading near the Spring-head, the contiguous street became so swampy, or fenny, especially about the church, which stood in the broad way between Mincing-lane and Rood-lane, that it was then called Fenchurch-street. The Ward also partook of the name, and was enrolled in the city records by the appellation of Langbourne and Fenny-about.

— A New History of London Including Westminster and Southwark by John Noorthouck, Book 2, Ch. 23: Langbourn Ward

The church of St Katherine Coleman is indeed at the head of the course of the Lorteburn described by Bentley, but the rest of Stow and Noorthuck's descriptions are problematic given that they would require the water to flow uphill in the vicinity of Mincing Lane (see below).

== Nicholas Barton's disbelief ==
The 1962 book Lost Rivers of London by Nicholas Barton is considered by many to be the foundational work on London rivers. Barton refutes the existence of the Langbourne for three reasons:

1. "It does not fit in with the contours, and actually involves the proposed stream's flowing uphill to the extent of three feet, both in the ancient and modern ground levels."
2. "During the construction of the Gracechurch Street sewer the builders specifically looked for it and found no traces."
3. "Stow more or less admits that he himself has nothing more to go on than the name."

Barton's denial of the stream thus rests on Stowe's description, which describes a route far to the west of the one proposed by Bentley.

== Inclusion on modern maps ==
The Lorteburn is included on some modern maps of Roman Londinium and early Medieval London.

- Londinium: A descriptive map and guide to Roman London. Ordnance Survey. June 1981.
- Hingley, Richard (2018). Londinium: A Biography: Roman London from its Origins to the Fifth Century. Bloomsbury Academic. ISBN 978-1350047297.
- Barron, Caroline (2019). A Map of Medieval London: The City, Westminster and Southwark. The Historic Towns Trust. ISBN 978-0993469855.
- The above map is reproduced online as the Medieval London, 1270 - 1300 layer of Layers of London at https://www.layersoflondon.org/map/overlays/medieval-london-1270-1300
- The Archaeology of Greater London online map produced by MOLA (Museum of London Archaeology) and regularly updated at https://molarchaeology.maps.arcgis.com/apps/MapSeries/index.html?appid=9a85640effc042ae91af6b0d43abbafb (The Lorteburn is visible on the Prehistoric, Roman and Saxon views.)
