= Langbourn =

Ward of the City of London

Coordinates: 51.512°N 0.085°W

- Ward
- Location within Greater London
- Langbourn ward boundaries since 2013
- OS grid reference: TQ331809
- Sui generis: City of London
- Administrative area: Greater London
- Region: London
- Country: England
- Sovereign state: United Kingdom
- Post town: LONDON
- Postcode district: EC3
- Dialling code: 020
- Police: City of London
- Fire: London
- Ambulance: London
- UK Parliament: Cities of London and Westminster
- London Assembly: City and East

Langbourn is one of the 25 ancient wards of the City of London. It reputedly is named after a buried stream in the vicinity.

== Politics ==
Langbourn is one of 25 wards of the City of London, electing an alderman to the Court of Aldermen and three councilmen (the City equivalent of a councillor) to the Court of Common Council of the City of London Corporation. Only electors who are a freeman of the City of London are eligible to stand.

== Geography ==
It is a small ward; a long thin area, running in a west–east direction. Historically, Lombard Street and Fenchurch Street were the principal streets, forming the cores of the ward's West and East divisions respectively. Boundary changes in 2003 and 2013 have resulted in most of the northern sides of these streets remaining in Langbourn, whilst the southern sides are now largely in the wards of Candlewick, Bridge, Billingsgate and Tower. Three changes to the boundaries of Langbourn took place in 2013; all of the southern side of Lombard Street, with the notable exception of the guild - or ward - church of St Mary Woolnoth, is in Candlewick (from 2003 to 2013 Candlewick extended only to Abchurch Lane); the ward of Walbrook now includes the northern side of Lombard Street from number 68 to Bank junction. In turn, Langbourn expanded by taking another part of Leadenhall Market, from Lime Street ward.

The ward at present borders eight other wards (Walbrook, Candlewick, Bridge, Billingsgate, Tower, Aldgate, Lime Street, and Cornhill); historically no other City ward bordered so many neighbours.

The ward encompasses a large area of Leadenhall Market and two historic churches: St. Mary Woolnoth and St. Edmund's. Historically, the ward also contained four other churches: St Nicholas Acons (destroyed in the Great Fire 1666), All Hallows Staining (demolished 1870), St. Dionis Backchurch (1878), and All Hallows Lombard Street (1939). It has its own club for ward officials, City workers and residents and newsletter.

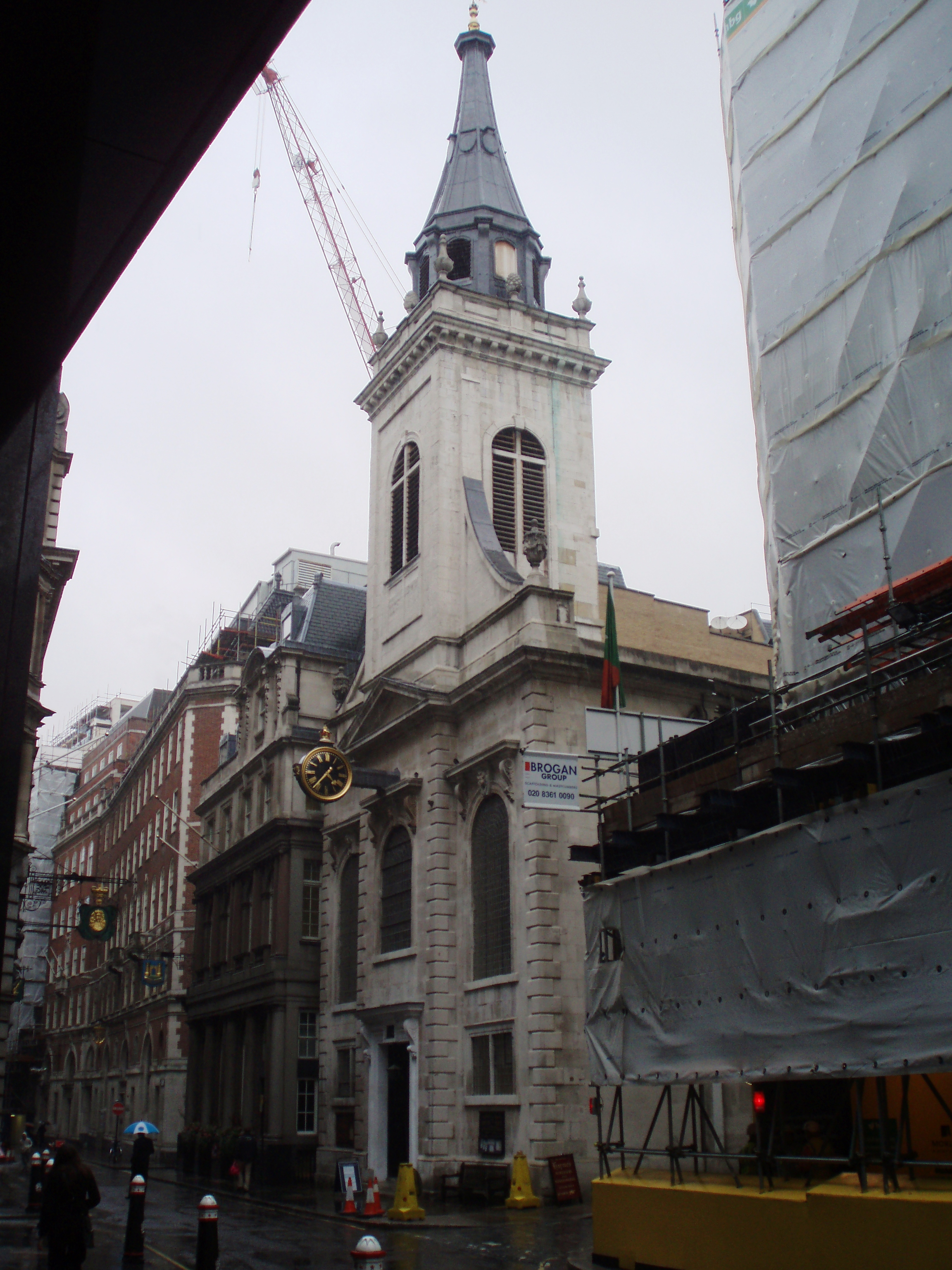
St. Edmund's on Lombard Street

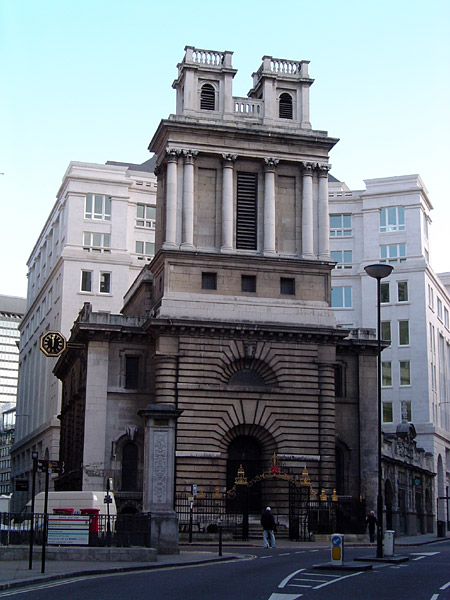
St. Mary Woolnoth on the corner of Lombard Street and King William Street

== Lost river ==
The 1598 Survey of London records the course of the Langbourn river. The entry notes that the Langbourne had ceased to flow by the time the entry was written.

"Langborne water so called of the length thereof, was a greate streame of water breaking out of the ground, in Fan Church streete [Fenchurch St], which ran downe with a swift course, west, through that streete, thwart Grastreet [Gracechurch Street] and downe Lombardestreete [Lombard Street], to the west ende of S. Mary Woolnothes Church, and then turning the course South downe Shareborne lane [Sherbourne Lane], so termed of sharing or deviding, it brake into divers rilles or rillets to the River of Thames, of this Bourne that warde tooke the name, and is till this day called Langborne warde, this Bourne also is long since stopped up at the heade and the rest of the course filled up and paved over, so that no signe thereof remaineth more then the names aforesaide."

The John Stowe's 1598 Survey of London records the street name Sharebourne Lane and attributes its origin to the dividing of the stream at this point. Henry Harben's 1918 Dictionary of London asserts that Stowe's explanation "must be left out of account as a possible derivation, inasmuch as it ignores the earliest forms of the name to be found." It goes on to list "Shitteborwelane," "Shiteburn lane," "Shiteb(ur)uelane" and "Shiteburlane as forms of the name recorded around 1300 AD. Harben goes on to state that:

"The first syllable " shitte," " shite," "schite," presents considerable difficulty, and it is hard to See from what A.S. [Anglo Saxon] word it can be derived, as the suggested derivation from A. S. "scir "= a share, "sciran "= to divide, seems to leave the "t" out of account. The word "borwe," "borue" suggests O.E. "burh," "burgh," "borough," rather than "burn" or "bourne," as the original form. "Burgh "= fortress, walled town, later perhaps "a mansion," "fortified house."

Later commentators have made the conclusion that the modern english translation is either "Shit House Lane" or "Shite Bourne Lane" and refers to public latrines that were placed over the river.

Nicholas Barton, in his 1962 book "Lost Rivers of London" lists the Langbourn in his chapter on "Dubious Lost Rivers" for three reasons:

1. "It does not fit in with the contours, and actually involves the proposed stream's flowing uphill to the extent of three feet, both in the ancient and modern ground levels."
2. "During the construction of the Gracechurch Street sewer the builders specifically looked for it and found no traces."
3. "Stow more or less admits that he himself has nothing more to go on than the name."
