= Platform (art group) =

Art group social and environmental justice

Platform London is an interdisciplinary London-based art and campaigning collective founded in 1983 that creates projects with social justice and environmental justice themes. Platform describes itself as "bringing together environmentalists, artists, human rights campaigners, educationalists and community activists to create innovative projects driven by the need for social and environmental justice. This interdisciplinary approach combines the transformatory power of art with the tangible goals of campaigning, the rigour of in-depth research with the vision to promote alternative futures."

A 1992 project by Platform sparked a local campaign to dig up the River Effra in London, England.

Their ongoing research into the political economy of oil is called the Unraveling the Carbon Web. Platform has written several books tracking the oil industry, including The Oil Road: Journeys from the Caspian Sea to the City of London published by Verso Books in 2013 and The Next Gulf: Britain, the USA and the politics of oil in the Gulf of Guinea published in 2005 by Constable & Robinson. Some Common Concerns - Imagining BP’s Azerbaijan-Georgia-Turkey Pipelines was released in October 2002.

Past work has included a campaign against the proposed oil law in Iraq, a series of performances about BP and climate change for oil analysts and journalists, a living memorial to the Nigerian activist Ken Saro-Wiwa, a book exploring the psychology of those who work within major corporations, and a campaign to stop the Royal Bank of Scotland being the major European private financier of oil and gas.

Platform is in a long-running argument with the Tate over its sponsorship by BP, describing it as "a serious stain on the UK's cultural patrimony". Some artists with work in the Tate have backed Platform's opposition to BP, including Conrad Atkinson. Art critic Jonathan Jones opposed Platform's demands: "If they can get money from Satan himself they should take it." Interviewed during BP's Deepwater Horizon oil spill, Tate Director Nicholas Serota explained "We look for long-term partners and one of those long-term partners is BP. They have been with us for 20 years. We all recognise they have a difficulty at the moment but you don't abandon your friends because they have what we consider to be a temporary difficulty."

A "Living Memorial" to Ken Saro-Wiwa was unveiled in London on 10 November 2006 by Platform, on the 11th anniversary of his execution. Created by Nigerian-born artist Sokari Douglas Camp, it consists of a steel sculpture of a bus with Saro-Wiwa's words inscribed in the side: "I accuse the oil companies of genocide against the Ogoni". It has toured England, visiting the Shell headquarters and Glastonbury.

In 2006, with funding from Arts Council England, they produced And While London Burns, a downloadable operatic tour of the financial district within the City of London which examines the impact of business on climate change.

== Key works ==
Still Waters Project

The Carbon Web

Licence to Spill

== Bibliography ==
- Liberate Tate, Platform, Art not Oil (2011). Not if But When: Culture Beyond Oil. London. ISBN 978-0-9567365-3-6.
- Marriott and Mika Minio-Paluello, James (2012). The Oil Road. London: Verso. ISBN 9781844676460.
- Muttitt, Greg (2012). Fuel on the Fire. London: Vintage. ISBN 9781847921116.
