= Homestall Farm =

Coordinates: 51°27′24″N 0°03′38″W

Homestall Farm consisted of a farm house, barn, and substantial land surrounding it, and was located on the site of what is now Peckham Rye park in southeast London, England. The farm was acquired by the London County Council in 1894 for the sum of £51,000. The buildings were removed in 1908.
