= Earl's Sluice =

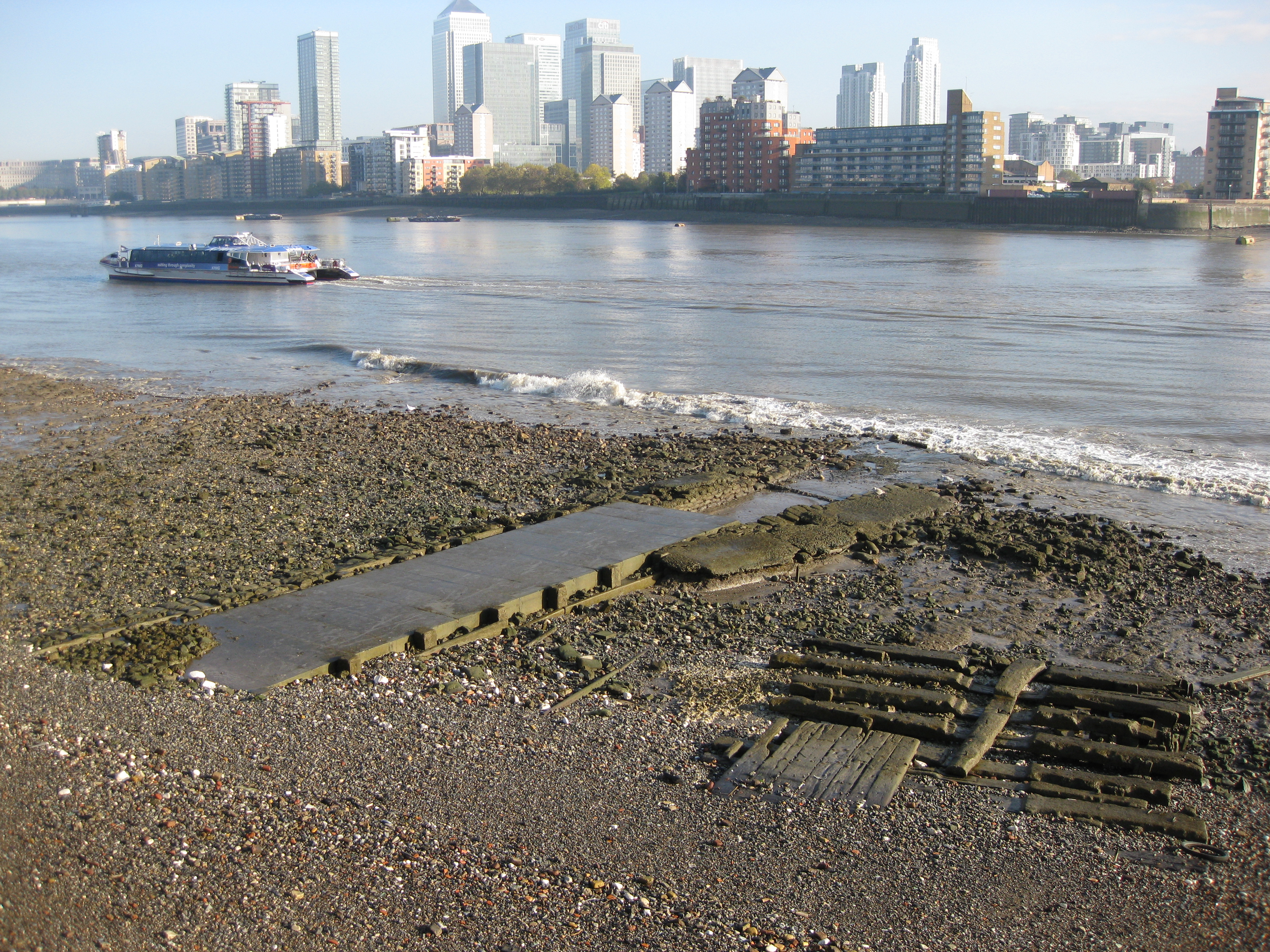
- The culverted mouth of the Earl's Sluice at Deptford Wharf

Location
- Country: England
- Counties: Greater London
- Towns: Deptford

Physical characteristics
- Source: Ruskin Park
  - location: Denmark Hill
  - coordinates: 51°28′0″N 0°5′33″W
- Mouth: River Thames
  - location: Deptford Wharf
  - coordinates: 51°29′35″N 0°1′56.33″W

Basin features
- Tributaries
  - right: River Peck

Earl's Sluice is an underground river in south-east London, England. Its source is Ruskin Park on Denmark Hill. In South Bermondsey it is joined by the River Peck before emptying into the Thames at Deptford Wharf.

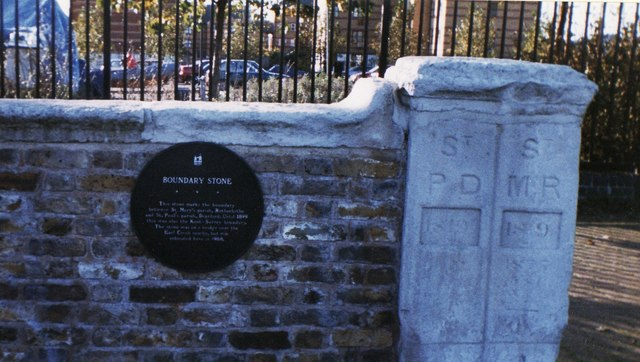
This stone marks the boundary between St Mary's parish, Rotherhithe and St Paul's parish, Deptford. The stone was on a bridge over the Earl Creek nearby, but was relocated to its present position (on the Thames Path between the confluence of the Sluce and the entrance to South Dock, Rotherhithe in 1988.

Earl's Creek marks the boundary between St Mary's parish, Rotherhithe and St Paul's parish, Deptford and their successors the London Borough of Southwark and the London Borough of Lewisham. It also marks the boundary between the historic counties of Kent and Surrey. The river is named after the Earl of Gloucester in the time of Henry I.

In the 14th century, the crossing point of the Earl’s Sluice and the Old Kent Road was known as the wateryng of Seint Thomas, or St. Thomas-à-Watering, and was mentioned by Geoffrey Chaucer in The Canterbury Tales as a place where the pilgrims water their horses on their way to Thomas Becket's shrine. In the Tudor period St. Thomas-à-Watering was also the location for public executions.

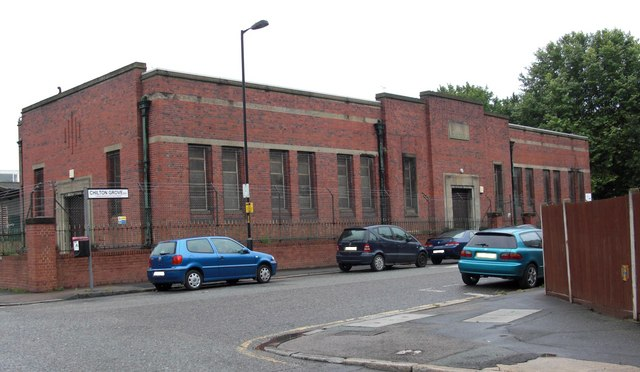
Earl Pumping Station: although closed for years, it processed the water from the Earl's Sluice to the Thames.

== See also ==
- Subterranean rivers of London
- Thames Tideway Scheme
