= Muswell Stream =

Watercourse in the London Borough of Haringey

Coordinates: 51.613°N 0.109°W

The Muswell Stream is a watercourse in the London Borough of Haringey, and one of the subterranean rivers of London It originates in Muswell Hill from three source rivers. The largest of the springs is now under a private home on Muswell Road. In the 12th century, the spring was on land that belonged to the Bishop of London and was used as farmland. Healing powers were attributed to this source and it was therefore consecrated to the Virgin Maria and a chapel built in its place for the pilgrimage to take place. According to tradition, Scottish king Malcolm IV is said to have been healed by the water of the spring.

In 1875 one of the issues was diverted to a lake in Alexandra Park. The part of the park in question was sold in 1899, the lake drained and the watercourse moved underground to build Grove Avenue and Rosebery Road.

The Wood Green and Hornsey laundry used water from the Muswell Stream in the 1890s.

The watercourse was completely submerged in the 1920s and 1930s. Underground water reservoirs should not always successfully ensure that the watercourse absorbs large amounts of precipitation from its catchment area. The mouth of the Muswell Stream in the Pymmes Brook is the last visible part of the watercourse.
