= Deptford Wharf =

Coordinates: 51.491769°N 0.031789°W

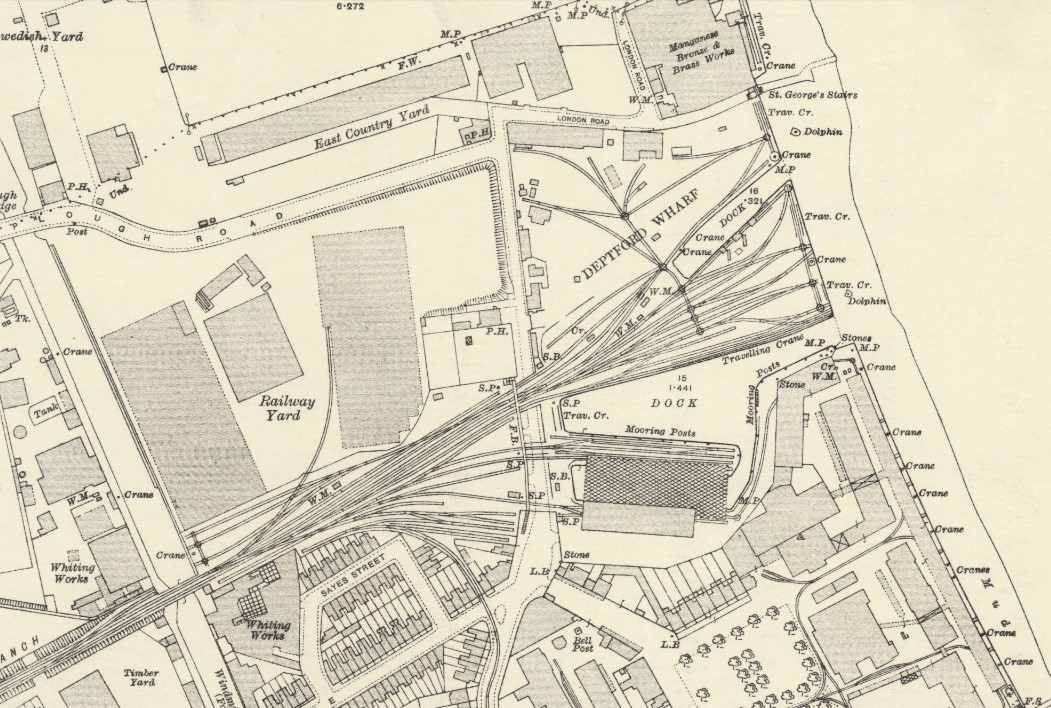
Ordnance Survey of Deptford Wharf 1914

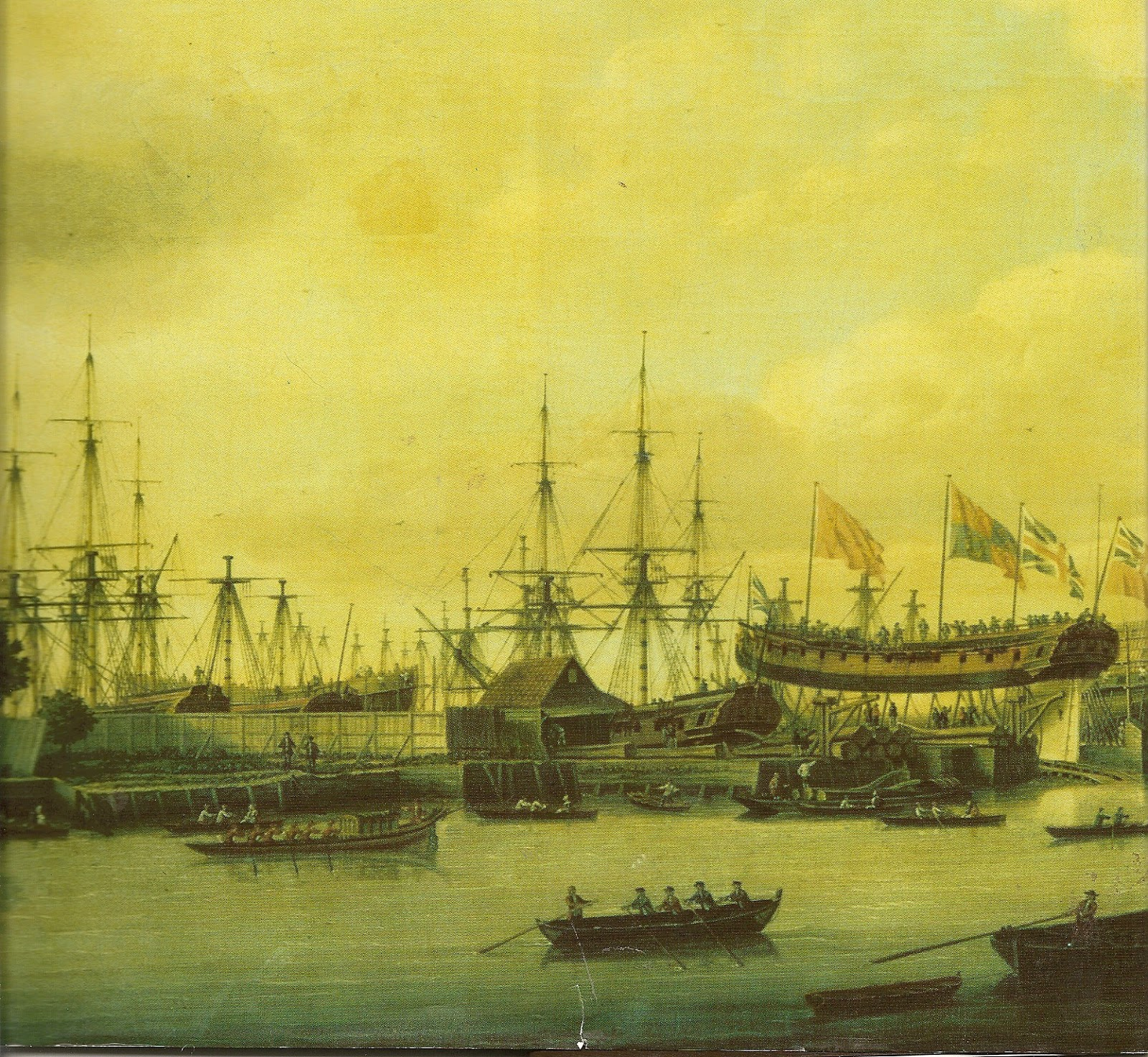
Excerpt of the painting A view from the waters of Messrs Barnard and Dudman's Shipyard, Deptford by John Cleveley, exhibited by The Society of Artists, 1774

Deptford Wharf in London, United Kingdom, is on the Thames Path southeast of South Dock Marina, across the culverted mouth of the Earl's Sluice and north of Aragon Tower. In the late 18th and early 19th century this area was used for shipbuilding with several building slips. With the coming of the railway in 1848 Deptford wharf and docks were used to import coal and for other goods. The housing here, completed in 1992, is on the site of former railway sidings and riverside wharves.

== Dock and shipyard ==
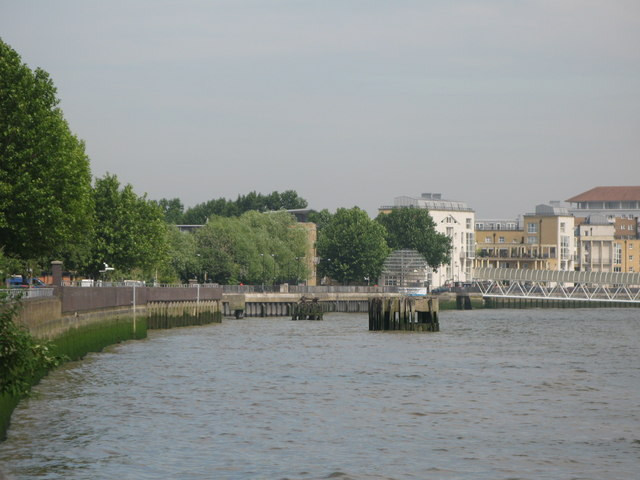
The river wall at Deptford Wharf

The dock built was by John Winter in 1704 and belonged to the Evelyn family. Described in 1726 as having a great depth of water, and as being the best private dock upon the river.

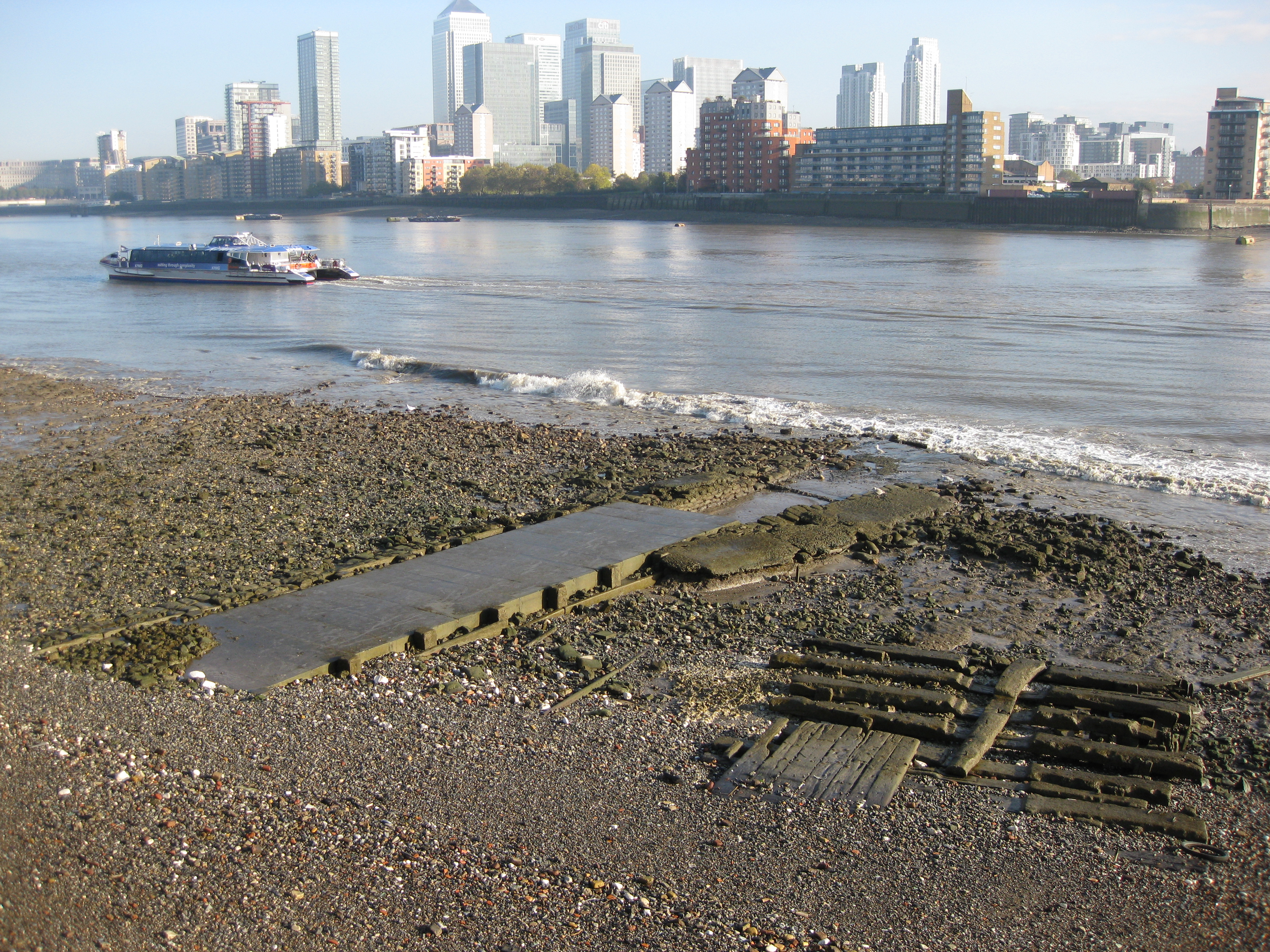
Slipway remains and the culverted mouth of the Earl's Sluice.

William Dudman established the yard. To complete some contracts he went into partnership with Henry Adams of Bucklers Hard and William Barnard of Ipswich. When William died in 1772 his son John Dudman took over. From about 1808, the yard was shown as Dudman & Son. By 1814, the yard had five building slips and two double dry docks.

Between 1783 and 1812, they built 23 warships and two East Indiamen. From about 1825, Gordon & Co shipbuilders ran the yard. Then in 1838, it was owned by A. Gordon. Gordon built a number of small steamships (typically 50 to 100 tons), and then sold up in 1842. The sale included "a valuable freehold and leashold wharf with 128 feet river frontage" as well as foundry, warehouses, engine house, yard and other items associated with their shipbuilding business.

In March 1846, the London and Croydon Railway announced they had "made arrangements for possession of a large wharf and dock adjoining Her Majesty's victualling yard at Deptford". Later that year a merger of railway companies meant this became a project of the London, Brighton and South Coast Railway (LB&SCR), who in 1848 reported the purchase from the Surrey Dock Company had given them "400 feet of river frontage; a wharf of 500 feet at which they would be able to discharge 15 or 16 ships at a time". With the building of a railway branch (see below) and associated infrastructure Deptford Wharf became a thriving commercial dock, and c1900 a new jetty was built into the wet dock, and covered wharfage provided for goods that would be spoiled by rain.

The rail link was lost in the early 1960s, in a period when all usage of the Surrey Docks was in decline following the move to larger vessels and to containerised transport of goods. Eventually this led to the Deptford docks being filled in and the area being redeveloped, with the emphasis being on housing. Main article : Surrey Commercial Docks

By 1807, the wet dock was in use for convict transports by ship to Australia.

== Ships built at Deptford Wharf ==
This is not a complete list of the ships built at Dudman's yard.

Name	Date	Notes
HMS Carnatic	1783	Paid for by the East India Company, presented to the Navy
HMS Phoebe	1795	
HMS Sirius	1797	
HMS Lady Nelson	1798	
HMS Northumberland	1798	
HMS Renown	1798	
HMS Apollo	1799	
HMS Amaranthe	1804	
HMS Manly	1804	
HMS Calypso	1805	
HMS Sultan	1807	
HMS Royal Oak	1809	
HMS Duncan	1811	
HMS Indus	1812	
Princess Charlotte	1812	East Indiaman
Duke of Sussex	1826	East Indiaman, builder Mr Gordon
Queen Adelaide	1830	West Indiaman, builder Mr Gordon, slip at St George's stairs

== Railways ==
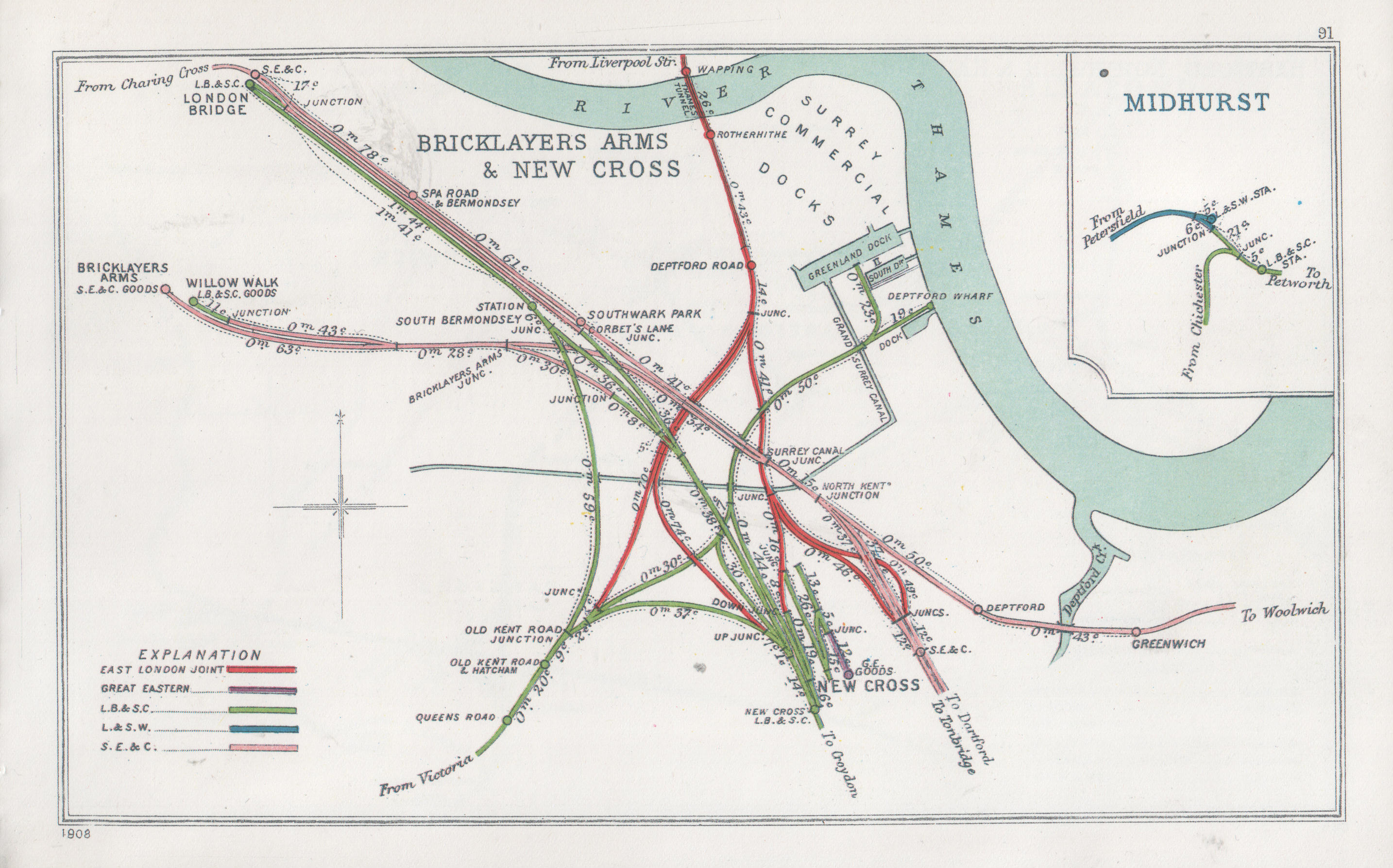
A 1908 Railway Clearing House map showing the LB&SC line from New Cross to Deptford Wharf

The project to own a wharf and build a branch line to it came from the London and Croydon Railway, who in March 1846 announced they had "made arrangements for possession of a large wharf and dock adjoining Her Majesty's victualling yard at Deptford"..."and a bill is now before parliament to enable the company to construct a line from thence to New Cross". They referred to the branch line as the "Thames Junction Branch". Later that year a merger of railway companies meant this became a project of the London, Brighton and South Coast Railway (LB&SCR).

In 1846, the board of the LB&SCR requested Chief Engineer Robert Jacomb-Hood to construct a branch line from New Cross to the River Thames at Deptford, where he was to also design, survey and manage the construction of a new dock system. Jacomb-Hood instructed his recently appointed assistant Frederick Banister to design, survey and manage the construction of the branch line and dock, which was completed in 1849.

The reception and marshalling sidings were separated from the docks by Grove Street and this crossing was controlled by crossing gates that had to cross 5 tracks, some of the widest level crossing gates in the country.

The ordnance survey map for 1894/5 shows a dockyard branch North to the granary on Greenland Dock, and the 1913 map shows a branch added South running along the centre of Grove Street to the HM Victualling Yard, Deptford opposite Junction Road (which had its own internal tramway), and to the adjacent Foreign Cattle Market (under the Contagious Diseases (Animals) Act 1869 (32 & 33 Vict. c. 70) imported live cattle had to be slaughtered at the port to prevent cattle diseases being brought into the country). The Grove Street rail link was planned in 1871 (when the cattle market opened), but was not built until 1899. It was owned by the Corporation of London, and was referred to as the Grove Street Light Railway in an application in 1902 to widen the gap between rail and check rail. Several photos exist of the unusual sight of a steam locomotive (LB&SCR D1 class) and wagons travelling down the middle of this residential street. The import of live cattle dropped dramatically in 1912 due to changes in the law, and in 1914 the foreign cattle market with its 23 acres and 360 yards of river side wharves and jetties, and its rail link, was sold back to the War Office (the site was originally part of the Navy Victualling yard).

The dock included two berths for colliers of up to 2500 tons capacity, and coal from Newcastle upon Tyne was regularly unloaded and moved by rail to the gas works at Waddon Marsh (and other smaller gas making facilities). Other goods were transferred to and from New Cross Marshalling yard before despatch around the country.

Deptford Wharf was visited by a rail tour in 1958, which showed that the docks and railway were still in active use, and the branch down Grove Street to the victualling yard was still connected. However, the victualling yard was closed in June 1961, and the rail branch serving Deptford docks was closed a year or two later with the tracks being lifted in 1963.
