= Gloucester Day =

Annual commemoration in Gloucester, England

Gloucester Day is a recently reinstated annual day of celebration of the City of Gloucester's history and culture.

The day was first held in the modern era on 5 September 2009 but originally dates from the lifting of the Siege of Gloucester in 1643, during which the city held out against Royalist forces during the First English Civil War. The lifting of the siege was celebrated annually in the city for centuries afterwards but died out in the nineteenth century.

The first of the modern celebrations was organised by the Town Crier Alan Myatt and the Gloucester Civic Trust and included a parade starting at St Michael's Tower.

The 2011 Gloucester Day took place during a week-long Gloucester History & Heritage Week and included a parade by the Mock Mayor of Barton.
