= Oyez =

English-language interjection announcing the opening of a legal court

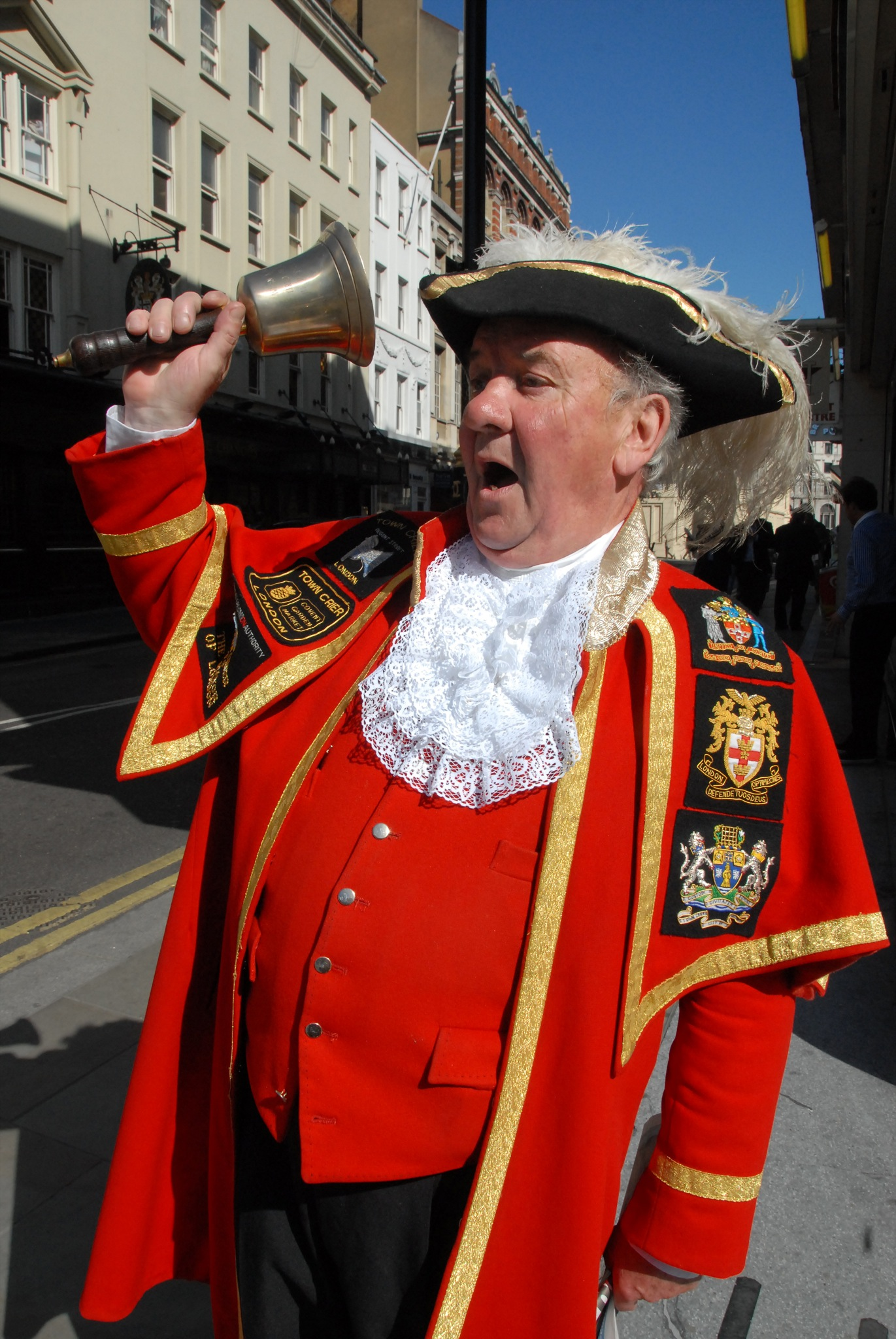
Peter Moore, Town Crier to the Mayor of London and the Greater London Authority, 2007

Oyez (/oʊˈjɛz/, /oʊˈjeɪ/, /oʊˈjɛs/; more rarely with the word stress at the beginning) is a traditional interjection said two or three times in succession to introduce the opening of a court of law. The interjection was also traditionally used by town criers to attract the attention of the public to public proclamations.

== History ==
Until the 18th century, speaking English in an English court of law was not required and one could instead use Law French, a form of French that evolved after the Norman Conquest, when Anglo-Norman became the language of the upper classes in England. Oyez descends from the Anglo-Norman oyez, the plural imperative form of oyer, from French ouïr, "to hear"; thus oyez means "hear ye" and was used as a call for silence and attention. It was common in medieval England, and France.

== Current usage ==
=== United Kingdom ===
In the United Kingdom, the Common Crier of the City of London shouts the phrase for all of the city's public proclamations, most notably the opening and closing of the Common Halls for the elections of the lord mayor and the sheriffs at Guildhall. His other duties include the reading of the proclamation dissolving Parliament from the steps of the Royal Exchange in London. Traditionally, a proclamation is delivered to the Mansion House from the Privy Council Office, at which point it is given to the Common Crier, who proceeds to read it publicly.

The phrase is also used by the Beadle at the start of a Wardmote in wards of the City of London: "Oyez, oyez, oyez. All manner of persons who have anything to do at this Court of Wardmote for the Ward of [ward name] holden here this day before Alderman [name], Alderman of this Ward, draw near and give your attendance. God save the King."

=== United States ===
The term is still in use by the Supreme Court of the United States. At the beginning of each session, the Marshal of the United States Supreme Court strikes a gavel and announces:

The Honorable, the Chief Justice and the Associate Justices of the Supreme Court of the United States. Oyez! Oyez! Oyez! All persons having business before the Honorable, the Supreme Court of the United States, are admonished to draw near and give their attention, for the Court is now sitting. God save the United States and this Honorable Court.

The phrase is also in use in other federal courts, such as the following:

- United States Court of Appeals for the District of Columbia Circuit
- United States Court of Appeals for the Second Circuit
- United States Court of Appeals for the Third Circuit
- United States Court of Appeals for the Seventh Circuit
- United States District Court for the Southern District of Texas
- United States District Court for the Eastern District of Pennsylvania
- United States District Court for the Eastern District of Virginia
- United States District Court for the Eastern District of Louisiana

The phrase is also in use in the state courts of Connecticut, Virginia, North Carolina, and Maryland.

In addition to courts, the word, again repeated three times, is announced by the Secretary of the State during the sine die ceremony at the conclusion of the Connecticut General Assembly's legislative session.

== See also ==
- Law French
- French language
- Norman language
- List of French expressions in English
- Jersey Legal French
- Franglais
