= Siege of Gloucester =

1643 battle during the First English Civil War

Coordinates: 51.864°N 2.2438°W

- Part of the First English Civil War
Date	10 August – 5 September 1643
Location	Gloucester, Gloucestershire
Result	Parliamentarian victory

Belligerents
Royalists	Parliamentarians

Commanders and leaders
Charles I	Edward Massey; Earl of Essex

Strength
15,650+	1,500 (Gloucester); 15,000 (Relief army)

Casualties and losses
120 killed 900 sick and wounded 800 desertions	30–50 killed

Gloucestershire

The siege of Gloucester took place between 10 August and 5 September 1643 during the First English Civil War. It was part of a Royalist campaign led by King Charles I to take control of the Severn Valley from the Parliamentarians. Following the costly storming of Bristol on 26 July, Charles invested Gloucester in the hope that a show of force would prompt it to surrender quickly and without bloodshed. When the city, under the governorship of Lieutenant-Colonel Edward Massey, refused, the Royalists attempted to bombard it into submission. Massey adopted an aggressive defence, and the Royalist positions outside the city were regularly disrupted by Parliamentarian raids. The Royalist artillery proved inadequate for the task of siege work and, faced with a shortage of ammunition, the besiegers attempted to breach the city walls by mining. With Royalist miners about to reach the city's east gate and the defenders critically low on gunpowder, a Parliamentarian army led by the Earl of Essex arrived and forced Charles to lift the siege.

== Prelude ==
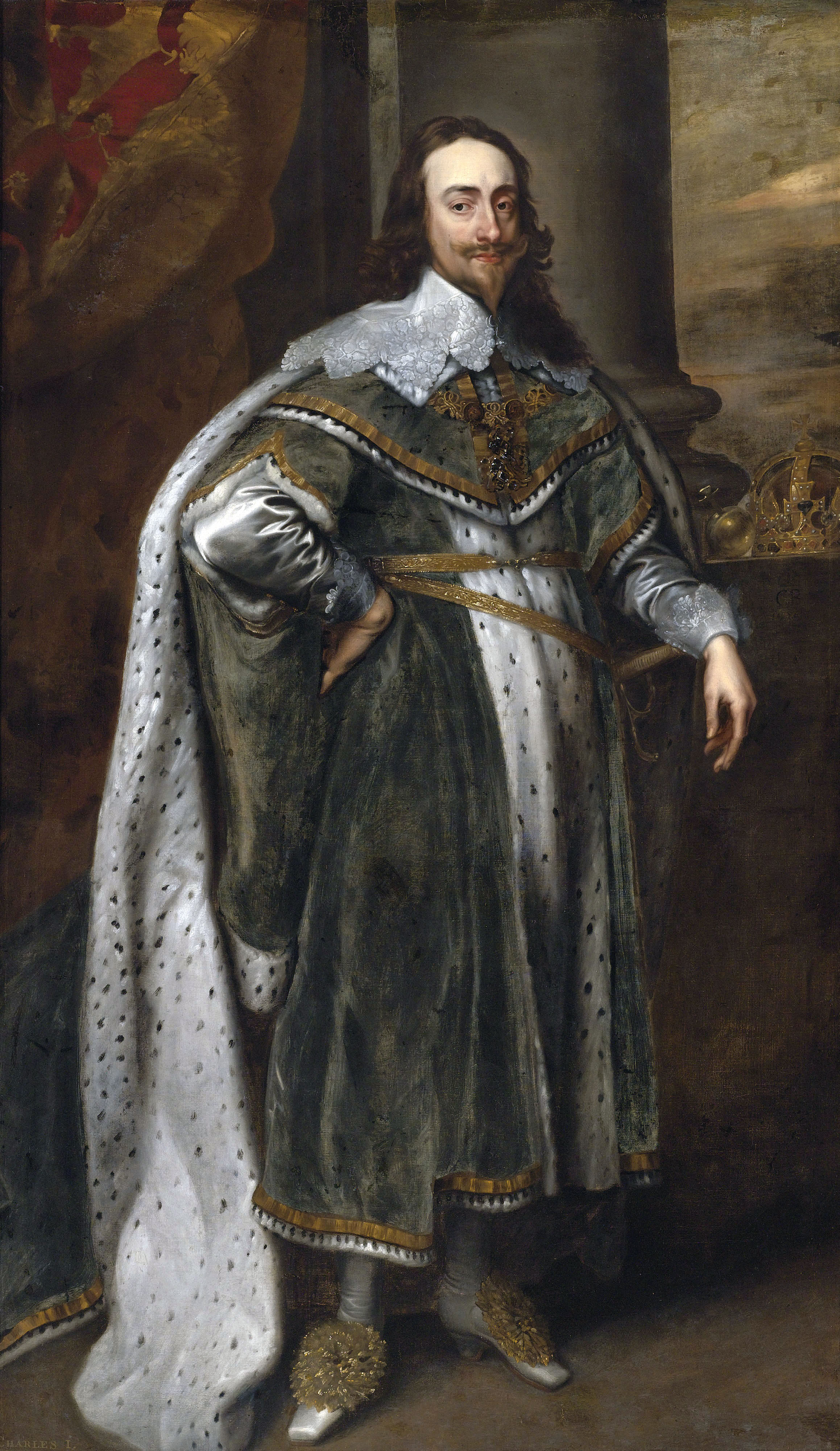
King Charles I

Following the Royalist defeat at the Battle of Edgehill in October 1642, King Charles I's control of the south was limited to Cornwall, Wales and the Marches, and a pocket of the Thames Valley around Oxford, where he based his wartime capital. The ruling Puritan elite of Gloucester ensured the city of some 5,000 inhabitants would be from the outset a staunchly Parliamentarian stronghold in the struggle against an anti-Puritan King and his Catholic Queen Henrietta Maria. Possession of Gloucester, along with Bristol to the south, threatened both Oxford and access to the Royalist recruiting grounds of Wales.

An unsuccessful attempt to rally Royalist support in Cirencester in August 1642 prompted Parliamentarians in Gloucestershire to muster the militia, and in November the first regular troops were garrisoned in Gloucester. In February 1643 the Royalist commander Prince Rupert easily defeated a militia garrison at Cirencester, prompting the Parliamentarians to recall their outposts at Berkeley, Sudeley and Tewkesbury. The next day Rupert appeared before Gloucester, but lacked the strength to enforce his demand for the city's surrender. Later that month an army of 2,000 Welshman led by Lord Herbert of Raglan arrived on the west bank of the Severn opposite the city, but lacked the strength for an assault across the river. Its presence caused great consternation in Gloucester until a Parliamentarian army commanded by Sir William Waller defeated it on 24 March.

The defeat of Waller in the Battle of Roundway Down on 13 July by the Royalist Western Army left both Bristol and Gloucester vulnerable, and on 18 July Rupert led another Royalist army out of Oxford to take control of the Severn valley. On 26 July Rupert's Oxford Army, supported by the Western Army, seized Bristol. Royalist casualties were high, and despite Rupert's instructions to the contrary, the victorious troops plundered the city. Rupert was appointed governor of Bristol, but infighting within the Royalist leadership and concerns that an attack on Gloucester would result in the same high casualties prompted King Charles I to travel to Bristol for a council of war. He arrived on 2 August, and over the next five days consulted with his advisers on the best course of action. The strategic situation since Edgehill had improved significantly for the Royalists, with victories in the north of England, the arrival of reinforcements and materiel in June, and an opposition that had fallen into disarray. Rupert's plan to consolidate the Royalist grip on the west by seizing Gloucester faced opposition from those in the King's camp, led by his wife Queen Henrietta Maria, who believed a march on London could end the war.

The capture of Gloucester would give Charles some advantages. It would allow the Royalist garrisons farther up the Severn at Worcester and Shrewsbury to be supplied from Bristol, with consequent benefit to the economy of that city. Gloucestershire – populous, wealthy and Parliamentarian – could be punitively taxed, and Welsh manpower and money could be freely deployed against the King's enemies in the rest of the country. Although it was likely that Rupert would have been able to storm a city that was less well defended than Bristol, Charles was not willing to risk the casualties an assault would incur. On 6 August the Parliamentarian governor of Gloucester, Lieutenant-Colonel Edward Massey, refused to surrender the city, but in a secret communication he let it be known that he would do so if the King, rather than Rupert, led the army on Gloucester. Charles decided the next day that this was the best chance of securing Gloucester quickly and without bloodshed. This compromise plan pleased neither the Queen's faction, who saw it as an unnecessary diversion from the more decisive objective of London, nor Rupert, who remained in Bristol in the belief that the Royalist army was not strong enough to allow Massey to honourably surrender without a fight.

== Gloucester defences ==
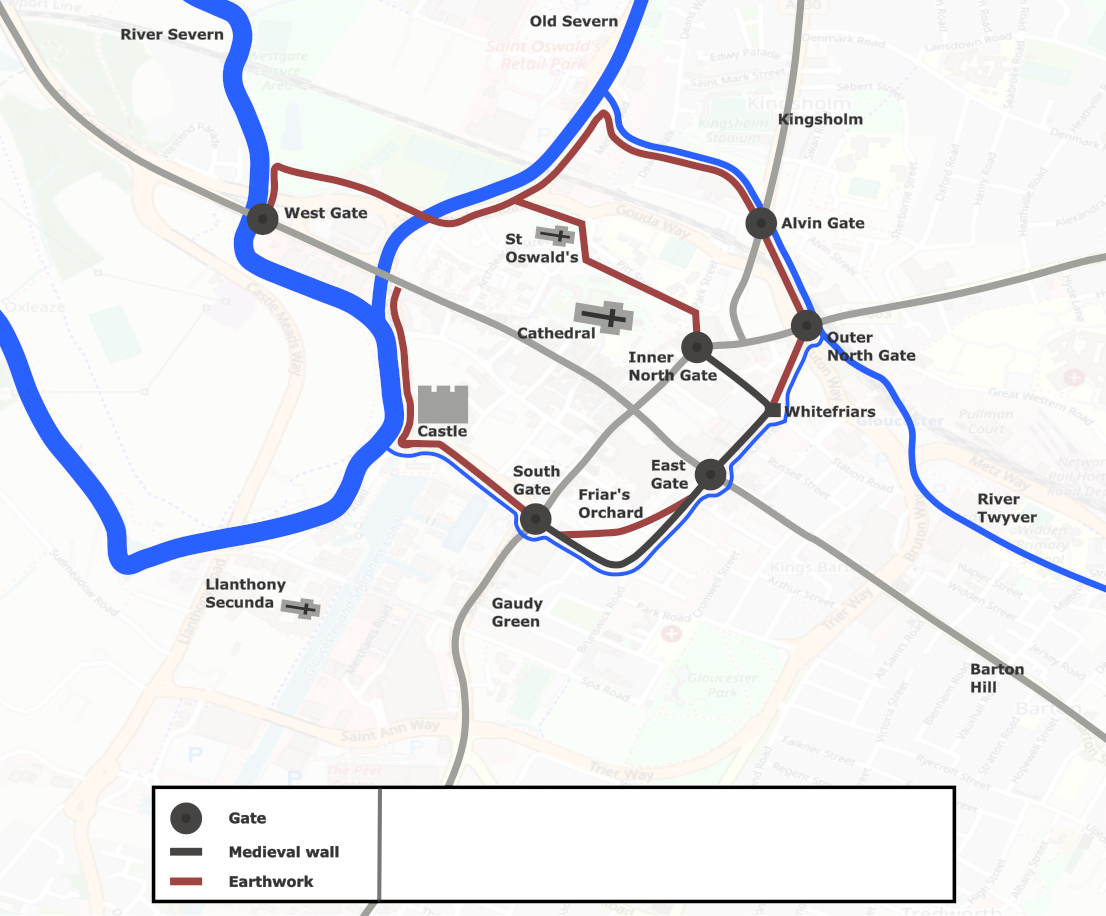
City defences during the siege

Gloucester's strength lay in its location. To the west, the River Severn formed a natural defence against an assaulting army. To the north and north-east the marshy ground was unsuitable for siege operations, and the River Twyver and a tributary stream added to the obstacles. This left the higher and drier ground to the east and south as the only feasible directions for an attack. In the preceding centuries the city had grown beyond its medieval defences, of which only the ruined castle by the river and a stretch of wall that linked the south, east and original north gates, the last known as the inner north gate and now well within the city, still survived. From the south gate to the east gate the wall was high but not thick enough to withstand 17th-century artillery or mining operations.

The fall of Bristol prompted the hurried reinforcement of the existing defences. New earthworks and a narrow water-filled ditch completed the line of fortifications from the south gate to the Severn. Another earthwork was extended north from Whitefriars Barn on the north-east corner of the medieval wall to the outer north gate. From there the River Twyver formed a moat as the earthwork followed it north-west to Alvin Gate then on to the river's junction with the Old Severn. This easternmost channel of the River Severn had dried up by the 19th century, but at the time of the civil war it was still a navigable river. The earthwork then followed the Old Severn south-west to a point a short distance north of Westgate Street, from where it was extended the other side of the Old Severn to the River Severn just above the west gate. Inside the city, an earthwork was extended west from the end of the medieval wall at the inner north gate via Gloucester Cathedral to St Oswald's Priory, where it met the new outer earthwork. The outer north gate and Alvin Gate were fortified with earthwork bastions, a drawbridge was installed at Westgate Bridge and the Old Severn was dammed at Dockham, causing the ground to north-west of the city to flood.

The garrison numbered no more than 1,500 troops. The bulk of these comprised two half-strength regiments each of some 600 men: the Earl of Stamford's Regiment of Foot, recruited from London and Leicestershire, and a locally recruited regiment known as the Town Regiment. The remainder comprised a company of trained band, 100 dragoons and a troop of cavalry. The city's dozen or so artillery pieces ranged in size from light cannon to two nine-pounder demi-culverins. Stamford's regiment was experienced and well led, though of uncertain discipline. The Town Regiment lacked experience but was motivated by its ties to the city it was defending, although there is evidence that some of its men would refuse to oppose the King. The city could support itself with basic necessities, but it lacked sufficient gunpowder to withstand an assault or prolonged siege.

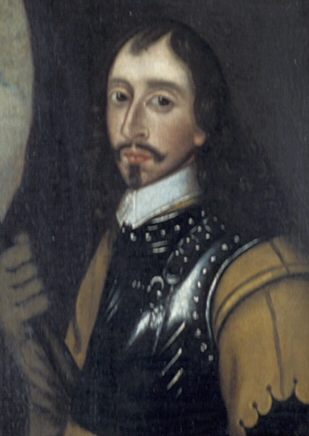
Edward Massey

Massey was an autocratic military commander, but his authority in the city was shared with the civilian administration. A committee had been established in December 1642 to manage the Parliamentarian war effort in the county, but Thomas Pury, the member of parliament for Gloucester, was the only committee member in the city. Civic authority was held by a forty-member council, though in practice an inner core of some fifteen aldermen, including the mayor, wielded power. As many of these were, like Pury, officers in the city's garrison, political and military command was largely integrated. In the days immediately following the fall of Bristol, morale in the city, both military and civilian, was low. It is possible that this was what prompted Massey to consider surrendering the city, though his message suggesting he would may have been a subterfuge designed to buy some time. There is strong evidence that the conduct and actions of the city elite, including Massey and particularly Pury, did much to stiffen the city's resolve in the days immediately before the siege began. Officers and councillors with Royalist sympathies were given the opportunity to leave, and those who remained were required to restate an oath of allegiance to Parliament. The discipline of the troops was improved by paying them, and civilians were kept busy reinforcing the city's defences.

== Siege ==
As Charles marched north from Bristol, Royalist reinforcements were converging on Gloucester from Oxford, Worcester and Herefordshire. By the afternoon of 10 August the Royalist army, comprising some 6,000 infantry and 2,500 mounted troops, began assembling around the city. Charles set up his headquarters at Matson House. His demand for Gloucester's surrender was unanimously and somewhat insolently rejected, and the Parliamentarians set fire to the suburbs outside the city defences to clear lines of fire and deprive the Royalists of cover. Charles had decided to march on Gloucester in the belief that the city would be quickly surrendered. Now that gambit had failed, he decided to besiege it. His pride had been wounded by the manner of the Parliamentarian rejection. His commanders, assessing the state of the city's defences, supplies and morale, persuaded him the city could be taken within ten days without an assault. Intelligence indicated that even if the Parliamentarians were able to send a relieving force, it could be easily defeated before it could reach the city. Most decisively, the Earl of Newcastle, whose support was necessary in any campaign against London, declared himself unable to march south while Hull remained in Parliamentarian hands, leaving Charles too weak to contemplate such a move.

=== First ten days ===
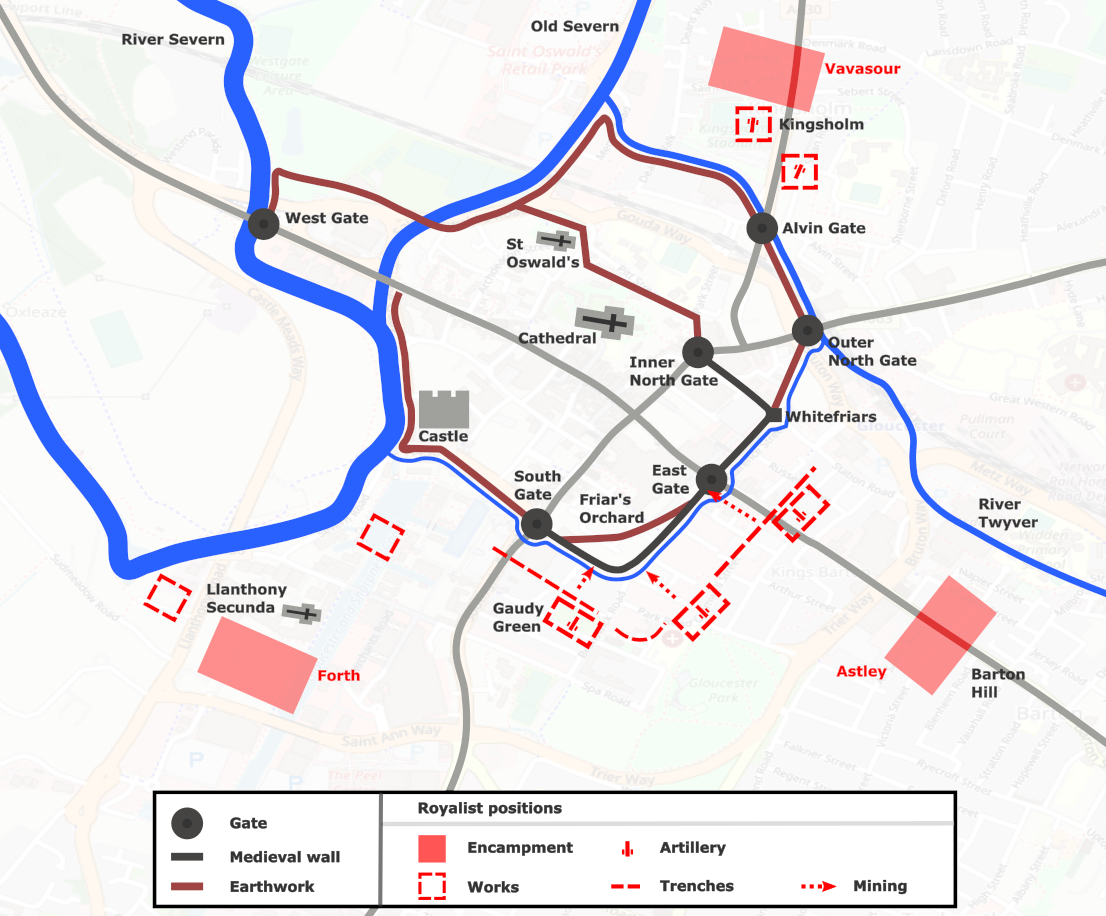
Royalist dispositions during the siege

The first shots were fired in the afternoon as Sir Jacob Astley established his forces near Issold's House on the eastern side of the city. Lord Forth, who had been given overall command of the siege, set up a fortified leaguer to the rear of the ruined Llanthony Secunda Priory and established his forces to the south of the city. By dawn on 11 August, a line of trenches had been dug some 130 yards (120 m) from the walls, placing the two sides within musket range of each other, stretching from Gaudy Green on the south side to Issold's House on the east.

Massey responded with spoiling tactics in an attempt to hinder Royalist siege operations and delay the assault he was expecting. At midnight a small raiding party succeeded in disrupting Royalist entrenching operations on Gaudy Green, and a larger raid on the green the next morning, 12 August, resulted in the capture of Royalist men, tools and weapons. By this time, the reinforcements from Herefordshire and Worcester under the command of Sir William Vavasour, 1st Baronet of Copmanthorpe arrived on the west bank of the Severn and began crossing the river to take up positions at Kingsholm, to the north of the city. This force increased the size of the besieging army by another 2,400 infantry and over 300 cavalry. They too were the target of a Parliamentarian raid which inflicted up to fifteen casualties.

Later on 12 August, Forth completed an earthwork square on Gaudy Green, in which he placed two 24-pounders, the largest of the Royalist's eight cannon, along with a 12-pounder to target the south wall. Another artillery emplacement was positioned nearby to target the east wall. With the artillery in place, the Royalists began bombarding the walls, the main effort beginning at 11:00 on 13 August. The cannon were too light to have any significant impact, and of the two mortars the Royalists possessed, one, reputed to be the largest in the country, exploded on its first use. When it became evident the Royalists were focusing their efforts on the south-east corner of the city defences, Massey quickly buttressed the medieval walls with up to 5 feet (1.5 m) of earth, which ensured that the defences held. Meanwhile, the majority of Vavasour's troops completed their crossing of the Severn, leaving behind a small contingent to blockade the west bank.

Reacting to rumours that Vavasour had received a reinforcement of artillery, the Parliamentarians mounted another raid to the north of the city on 14 August. They captured two prisoners but failed in their primary objective of locating and spiking any guns. The Royalist bombardment continued through 14 August, but a breach blown in the wall by the larger guns on Gaudy Green was quickly plugged by the defenders with woolsacks and gabions. Royalist engineers mining towards the walls from trenches at the green succeeded in draining the ditch below the walls, but this was not followed up with an assault. By the end of the day the Royalist guns had fallen silent; the evidence suggests they had run out of ammunition.

The following day Vavasour received a reinforcement of 500 Glamorgan militia and 450 musketeers from Bristol, while the Parliamentarians bolstered the earthwork defences around the south and north gates. On 16 August Rupert accompanied Charles to Oxford, and neither were at Gloucester to witness the most ambitious Parliamentarian raid yet. Just before sunset, 150 musketeers of Stamford's regiment sallied out of the north gate to attack the Royalist trenches east of the city. The Parliamentarians claimed 100 Royalist killed for the cost of 2 injured, while Royalist sources report 24 Parliamentarians killed and more wounded, for the loss of 4 Royalists killed.

Struggling with a shortage of gunpowder and with the guns quiet, the Royalists concentrated on mining operations to breach the city walls. Miners recruited from the Forest of Dean were set to work under a protective gallery to fill the 12-foot (3.7 m) deep by 30-foot (9.1 m) wide moat which, when completed, would allow them to undermine the walls. It was slow work, estimated to need a week to complete. The faster alternative was to forgo the protection and fill the moat with fascines. An attempt to do this was beaten back by musket fire from the walls, and resulted in the desertion of the miners.

By 18 August Vavasour had deployed three cannon in front of his main camp at Kingsholm and another opposite Alvin Gate. These were the targets of a Parliamentarian raid that morning that was even larger than previous efforts; a diversionary attack by 50 men and a main force of 400. All four of Vavasour's cannon were disabled, the Parliamentarians claiming over 100 Royalist casualties for the loss of 6, the Royalists admitting 28 casualties and claiming to have killed 27 Parliamentarians. Another Parliamentarian raid the same day involved their only recorded use of cavalry during the siege, when 150 musketeers and 40 cavalry mounted an ineffectual attack on Royalist positions to the east of the city. Charles, meanwhile, was on his way back to Gloucester with another 1,000 reinforcements.

By the morning of 19 August, two 6-pounder cannon had been installed in a third emplacement opposite the east gate, bringing all the original artillery online. At 10:00, the bombardment was resumed in a last effort to subdue the city by the original ten-day deadline. Constrained by the limited supplies of ammunition and gunpowder, the bombardment had little material effect, though it prompted Massey to hastily erect a breastwork in the open ground of Friar's Orchard, at the south east corner of the city where the Royalist artillery was being concentrated. A Royalist attempt to cross the moat after dark was beaten back by musket fire. The objective of forcing the surrender of Gloucester by siege in ten days had failed, partly due to the city's resolve and Massey's spoiling attacks, but mainly due to the inadequacy of the Royalist artillery.

=== Shift of focus to mining ===
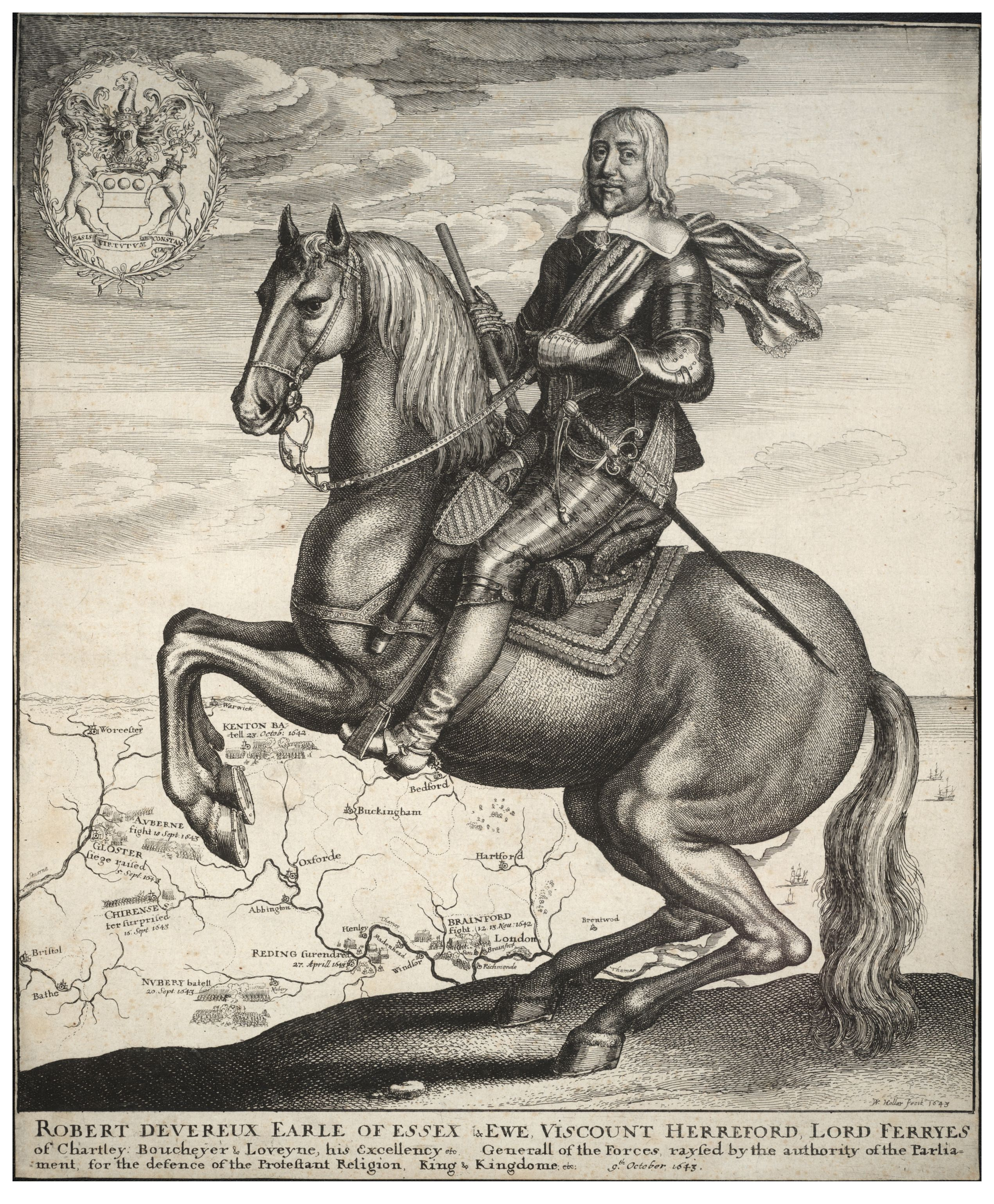
Earl of Essex

The Parliamentarians mounted another raid at dawn on 21 August. It was a two-pronged attack designed to disable the Royalist artillery south and east of the walls. One detachment travelled by boat down the Severn, landed between Forth's camp and a redoubt opposite the castle and successfully stormed the redoubt. The second detachment of 200 musketeers sallied from the north gate. Intending first to attack the battery opposite the east gate, this force became lost and blundered into Royalist infantry camps. When Massey saw that the raid was not going to plan, he sounded the recall. The Parliamentarians suffered eight casualties, the Royalists more than twenty. Such raids were proving risky and wasteful of the garrison's limited ammunition, and this was the last large-scale operation mounted by the Parliamentarians.

As the Royalists set about replenishing their stocks of ammunition, they intensified their mining efforts. It was anticipated that the original effort to bridge the moat would allow the besiegers to reach the east wall on 24 August. A second effort to bridge the moat to the south was begun, as was a more complicated project to tunnel towards the east gate. Royalist agents attempted to persuade the garrison to surrender, and Royalist cavalry staged a mock battle in an unsuccessful attempt to lure the garrison out of the city in the belief that a relief force had arrived. A desultory bombardment was maintained, particularly by the mortars, until 25 August, when it was intensified. An attempt that day by Massey to disrupt it with a sally from the north gate was beaten back by cavalry, but as before, a shortage of ammunition – at one stage the Royalists resorted to firing stones – blunted the impact, and little damage was done to the city.

Following news that the Earl of Essex was raising a Parliamentarian army in London, Charles and Rupert travelled to Oxford on 26 August, where they held a two-day council of war. With no intelligence of Essex's plans, the Royalists bolstered the defences of Oxford with troops earmarked for the siege of Gloucester while the Royalist garrison at Bristol was urged to send all the forces it could spare to Gloucester. Believing that Essex could muster no more than 6,000 troops, the decision was made to continue the siege, though contingency plans for the blockade of Gloucester were drawn up in case it had to be lifted. Lord Wilmot was instructed to muster 2,000 cavalry around Banbury. Their task would be to delay the Parliamentarians in the Cotswolds until Rupert could come up with the rest of the Royalist cavalry in support, should Essex march to the relief of Gloucester.

Essex began his march from Colnbrook, west of London, on 26 August. His plan was to relieve Gloucester without provoking a major battle in which, with the Royalist superiority in cavalry, he would be at a disadvantage. His route was dictated by the desire to minimise the amount of open country favourable to cavalry operations he would have to pass through, and took him north of Oxford via Aylesbury and Bicester and then across the Cotswolds. At the beginning of September Essex was due north of Oxford with an army of some 10,500 infantry, no more than 4,500 mounted troops and an artillery train that is estimated at no more than 50 guns.

Mining was now the principal tactic by which the Royalists hoped to bring the siege to a successful conclusion. Priority was given to tunnelling at the east gate, which caused progress on efforts to fill the moat below the south and east walls to slow, possibly as a result of a lack of miners and engineers. Parliamentarian countermining at the east gate on 28 August was quickly abandoned because of springs that caused flooding, which accounts for the slow pace of the Royalist efforts there. Massey continued to harass the besiegers with sniping and artillery fire, and he resumed countermining operations at the east gate after a reconnaissance party had reported Royalists miners were still working on their mine. The progress of the Royalist mines closer towards the walls, quickened by the arrival of Welsh miners on 29 August, led Massey to believe an assault was imminent. On 1 September he fortified Friars Orchard with an earthwork wall and sconce, a fort in which he placed four pieces of artillery that could be brought to bear on any Royalists who broke through the south-east corner or the east gate.

On 3 September the Parliamentarians placed a saker in a gun port they had been secretly building in east wall above the gallery protecting the Royalist miners. The medium-sized cannon was employed most of the day against the gallery, to little effect, until the Royalists targeted it with a cannon of their own, at which point it was withdrawn. The Royalists anticipated their mine would reach the east gate the next day, while they believed Essex could be delayed in the Cotswolds for four days. The Bristol garrison was being stripped for reinforcements and orders had been sent to Oxford for ten field guns and the equipment necessary to make the guns already at Gloucester mobile, should it become necessary to redeploy them from siegework to use in open battle.

=== Approach of the relief army ===
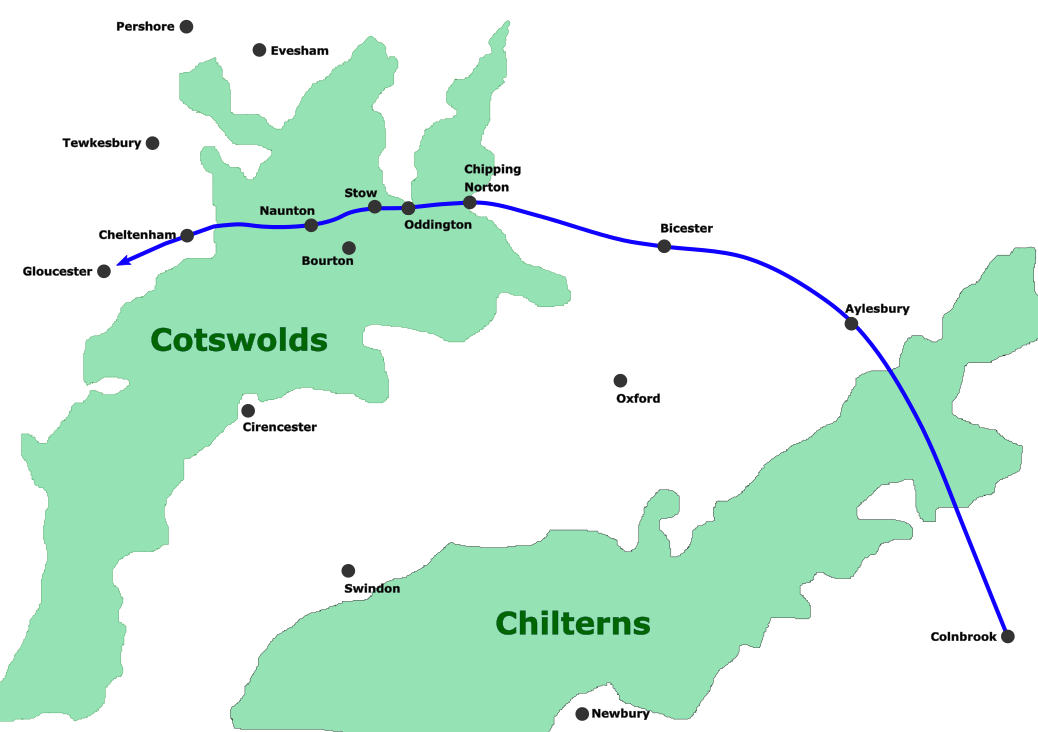
Route taken by Essex to Gloucester

By the end of 3 September Essex's lead element, the London brigade, was at Oddington, 2 miles (3.2 km) east of Stow-on-the-Wold. The Parliamentarian army was largely untroubled by Wilmot's Royalist cavalry, and because of the differing rates of march it was strung out as far back as Chipping Norton, nearly 6 miles (9.7 km) to the east. Meanwhile, Rupert had led the rest of the Royalist cavalry from Gloucester and, having rendezvoused with Wilmot, ended the day with some 5,000 men camped around Bourton-on-the-Water, 4 miles (6.4 km) south-west of Stow. The next day the two forces clashed. Although Rupert enjoyed superior numbers, he was dissuaded from pressing his advantage by the appearance of Edmund Harvey with a regiment of Parliamentarian cavalry and two of infantry. When Essex arrived with the rest of the Parliamentarian army, Rupert was forced into a steady retreat to the area of Andoversford and Compton Abdale, while Essex's army ended the day around Naunton. Rupert had been surprised by the size of Essex's force and the skill with which it was handled, and had completely failed in his mission to delay it.

In Gloucester the Parliamentarians could see the evacuation of some 400 sick or wounded Royalists and the dispatch of some artillery away from the siege, but also the arrival of 2,000 infantry and 500 mounted reinforcements from Bristol. The defender's countermine reached outside the east gate, where they discovered and began boring down on the deeper Royalist mine, while inside the gate an earthwork was completed across the road and the buildings either side were turned into blockhouses. They were critically low on gunpowder, but buoyed by the sight of fires lit on nearby Wainlode Hill signalling the approach of Essex. The Royalists, meanwhile, were readying the heavy guns to move.

On 5 September Essex took the quickest way off the open country of the Cotswold hills down into the relative safety of the Severn valley. This meant descending the steep escarpment at Prestbury Hill towards Cheltenham, rather than heading directly to Gloucester. His lead elements began the difficult descent at dusk, but the baggage train and rearguard were forced to spend the night in worsening weather in the hills. Rupert, who appears to have expected a more direct march on Gloucester, was not in a position to harass the Parliamentarians, and returned to Gloucester. There he covered the Royalist army as it lifted the siege and withdrew to Matson, 2 miles (3.2 km) south-east of the city. Charles had already departed his headquarters there and ridden ahead to Painswick. The defenders inside the city did not know how close Essex was and, not quite believing the siege was over, remained vigilant behind their defences rather than attempt to harass the retreating Royalists.

== Aftermath ==
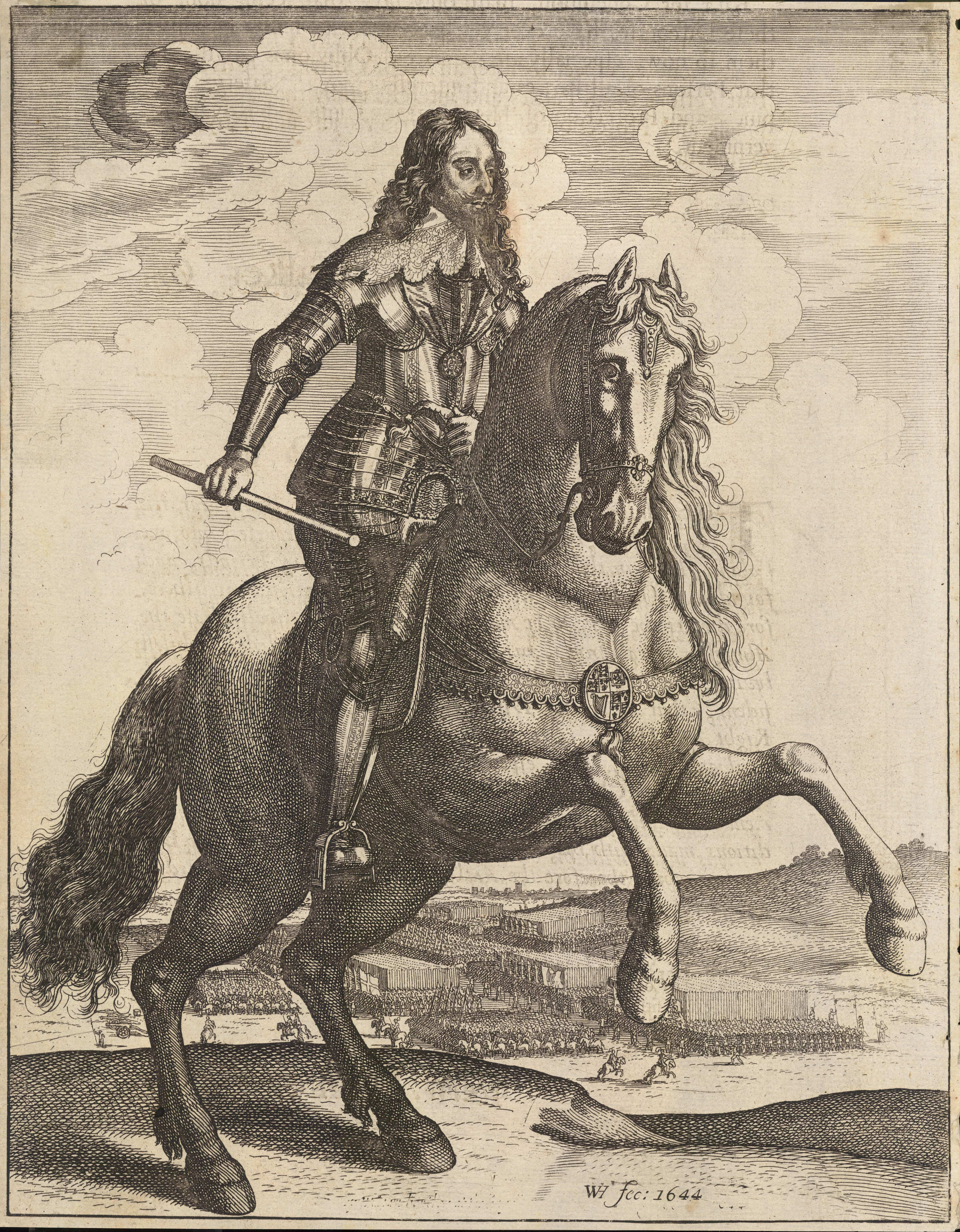
Charles leading his troops

Royalist casualties during the siege were claimed to be in the range of 1,000 to over 1,500, the Parliamentarian losses ranging from 30 to 50. Royalist sources concede 120 killed during the siege, with reports of sick and wounded giving numbers of 900, 400 and 300. Jon Day gives a conservative estimate of Royalist casualties as 1,200 killed, wounded and sick, with another 800 lost to desertion. The siege had come close to succeeding, and by the end of it the defenders were down to their last barrels of gunpowder. It is unlikely they would have been able to withstand an assault, but because of Charles's aversion to casualties, none was ever attempted. Massey's aggressive tactics were a critical factor in the successful defence of the city, and ensured that morale never dropped to the low levels witnessed before the siege began. The Royalists specifically identified his countermining as the reason for lifting the siege. The Royalist artillery proved inadequate to the task of siege work, and the 300–400 large cannonballs and 20+ mortar bombs that were fired on the city failed to blow any major breach in the walls, start any significant fires or cause more than a handful of casualties.

Although the failure at Gloucester adversely affected Royalist morale, the campaign presented Charles with an opportunity to inflict a decisive blow against his enemy. The Parliamentarian army and its trained band reserves had effectively been lured out of a strong position behind the London defences, into open country where they could be more easily defeated. Against a Parliamentarian army some 14,500 strong, the Royalist army of 9,000 infantry and 6,000 cavalry was slightly inferior in the quantity of infantry but superior in cavalry by a factor of three to two. The arrival of additional guns ordered from Oxford during the siege gave the Royalists parity in artillery.

Essex's objective after the siege was to evade the Royalist army and return his own intact to London. In a feint designed to draw Charles away from his intended route back to London, Essex marched north to Tewkesbury, where he could better supply his army and threaten Royalist Worcester. When Charles marched his army after him, Essex retraced his steps back to Cheltenham. With the Royalists concentrated around Evesham and Pershore, Essex was able to march back up into the Cotswolds in the direction of Cirencester, where he defeated the 400-strong Royalist garrison on 16 September.

Essex believed he had established a commanding lead over Charles and, not wishing to drive his hungry army too hard, slowed his pace on the march to Swindon. He was further slowed after Swindon when Rupert's cavalry caught up, and the resulting Battle of Aldbourne Chase on 18 September allowed the rest of the Royalist army to close the distance. Charles finally brought Essex to battle on 20 September in the First Battle of Newbury, but failed to defeat him, allowing the Parliamentarians to reach the safety of their London stronghold four days later.

Gloucester resumed its role as a logistic base for local operations and remained a Parliamentarian centre for the rest of the war, though Massey was removed as governor in 1645 over suspicions about his loyalty. By 1649 the burden of maintaining the garrison was generating divisions within the city. In 1651 a Scottish army moved south in support of the Royalists, prompting the city to restore its fortifications and raise a new town regiment. The garrison was withdrawn two years later, but in 1659, the city became increasingly divided as support for Parliament dissipated. Pury raised 300 troops to defend Gloucester for Parliament, while Massey, now a Royalist, plotted its capture. As the war came to an end Massey returned to and was elected as the member of parliament for Gloucester. After the restoration of the monarchy in 1660, King Charles II ordered Gloucester's walls to be demolished.

In 1956 Professor David Daube suggested that the nursery rhyme Humpty Dumpty originated from a siege engine used at Gloucester, based on a contemporary account of the attack, but without evidence that the rhyme was connected. The theory was part of an anonymous series of articles on the origin of nursery rhymes and was widely acclaimed in academia, but it was derided by others as "ingenuity for ingenuity's sake" and declared to be a spoof. In 2009 the annual Gloucester Day – a tradition begun after the siege to celebrate its lifting – was resurrected, having died out in the 19th century.
