= Umalohokan =

Precolonial town criers in the Philippines

Umalohokan refers to the town criers of precolonial barangays in the Philippines. They were responsible for going around and making people aware of new laws and policies enacted by the Datu or chieftain.

Some historians, however, have a different interpretation. In cases of large scale disputes between barangays in the Visayas, the respective Datus of the barangays may elect a head Datu, called an Umalohokan, to serve as judge. The Spanish colonizers noted that elections were held in the Philippines before they arrived, specifically for this post. When the dispute was settled, the term of the Umalohokan was over.
