= Vic Garth =

Australian town crier

Vic Garth (9 September 1912 – 10 April 2005) was town crier in Hobart, Tasmania, for more than 20 years, until his death in April 2005 at the age of 92. Though battling cancer for several years, he continued to greet cruise ships as they arrived, and frequently appeared at Hobart's Salamanca Market on Saturdays. In 2003 he became known as the oldest town crier in the world.
