= Tony Appleton =

British town crier

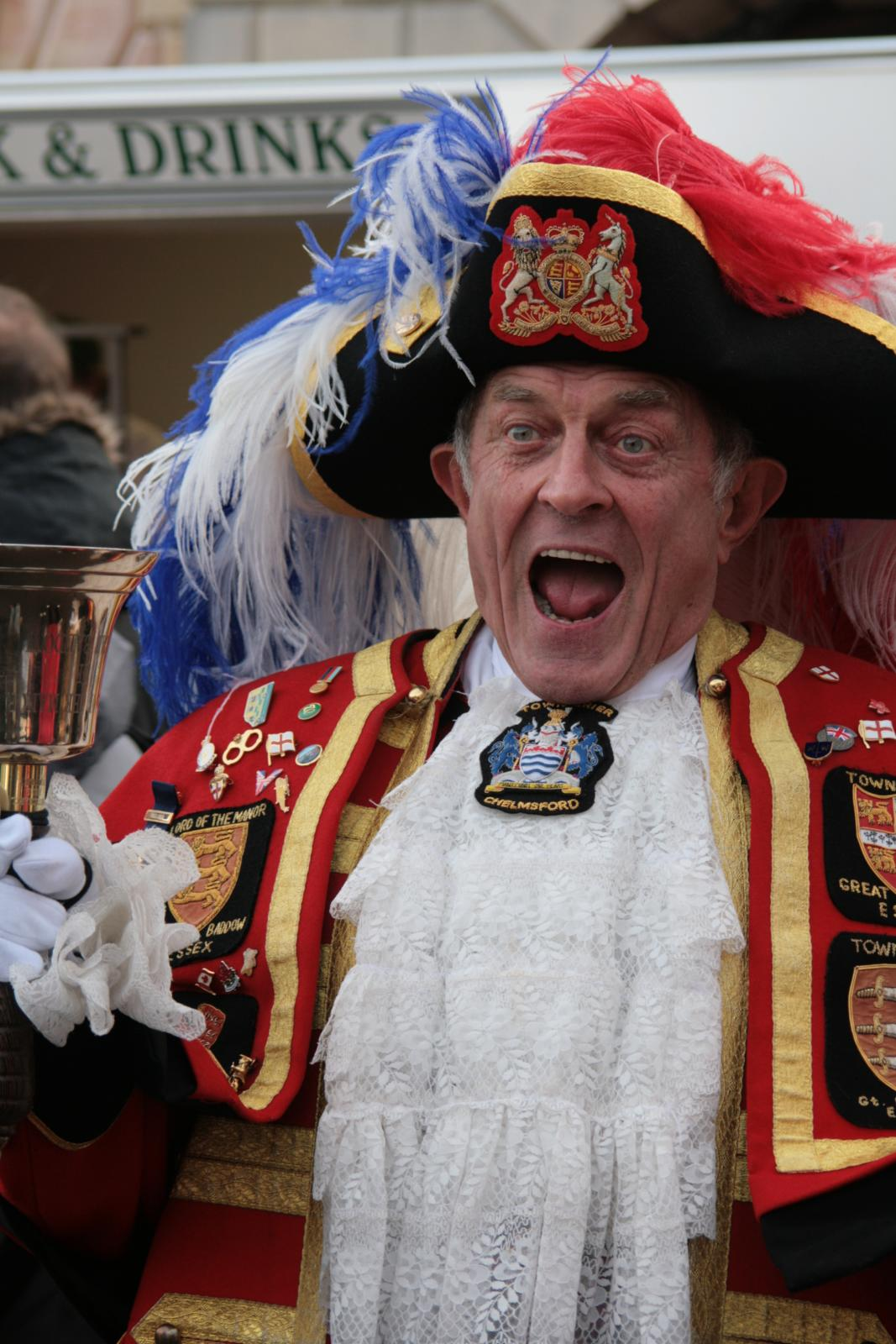
- Appleton in Bury St Edmunds, 2010
- Born: 1936 (age 89–90); Chelmsford, Essex, United Kingdom
- Occupation: Town crier
- Years active: 2000's - 4th October 2026

Tony Appleton (born 1936) is a retired British town crier who is most notable for his unofficial announcements of royal events such as the birth of Prince George of Cambridge in 2013.

== Early life ==
Appleton was born in Chelmsford, Essex. He served in the Royal Navy during the Suez Crisis and the Korean War upon HMS Implacable, and first met Queen Elizabeth II as a 17-year-old seaman during a royal inspection of the ship. After leaving the navy, Appleton dredged diamonds in Southern Africa and later owned a carpet shop. Appleton also owns a care home in his hometown.

== Career as a crier ==
Appleton later trained as a toastmaster and has opened events in Milan, Amsterdam, and Las Vegas. Appleton recalls being told by a young child at a fete opening that "he looked like a town crier", and having "never looked back" since then. In the early 2000s, Appleton became the official town crier of Romford in Essex. Appleton cites himself as the President of the Guild of International Millennium Town Criers on his website. Appleton later had unofficial crier duties at the 2011 wedding of Prince William and Catherine Middleton, the 2012 Diamond Jubilee of Queen Elizabeth II, and the 2012 Summer Olympics closing ceremony.

Despite having no formal royal role, Appleton is most famous for his unofficial announcements of royal births and other events. Appleton gained international fame in 2013 by announcing the birth of Prince George of Cambridge from the steps of the Lindo Wing at St Mary's Hospital in Paddington, London. Appleton, who describes himself as a royalist, stated that he arrived at the hospital unannounced and did not expect to be allowed onto the steps of the hospital to announce the birth. Appleton’s decision to turn up uninvited was misconstrued by American journalists Anderson Cooper and Rachel Maddow, who describes him as a royal crier when they aired his announcements on their shows. When it became clear Appleton had no formal status and was simply acting as a private citizen, Maddow issued a correction.

In May 2015, Appleton announced the birth of Princess Charlotte, Prince George's sister, from the same place as he had announced Prince George's birth. In an interview with Us Weekly, Appleton stated that in contrast to his earlier announcement, the royal entourage was expecting his attendance outside the hospital. Later in that year, Appleton announced from the gates of Buckingham Palace that Elizabeth II had surpassed her great-great-grandmother Queen Victoria as the longest-reigning monarch of Britain. In November 2017, Appleton – again in an unofficial capacity – announced the engagement of Prince Harry and American actress Meghan Markle from the gates of Kensington Palace in London.

Appleton returned to public attention in April 2018, when he announced the birth of Prince Louis of Cambridge from the steps of St Mary's Hospital. Appleton's announcement was once again assumed official by American news outlets, with CBS Morning News, who broadcast the announcement live, describing Appleton's announcement as "official" on the air and over the official CBS News Twitter account.

The Independent journalist Jon Stone compared Appleton's unofficial role to the presence of bishops in the House of Lords and the inability of Members of Parliaments to officially resign their seats in the House of Commons, whereas Huffington Post UK journalist Jess Brammar compared Appleton to the role of Black Rod and the corresponding spectacle relating to Black Rod's invitation to MPs to the annual Speech from the Throne.

== Retirement ==
In October 2026, Appleton stepped down from town crier duties.

== Autobiography ==
In 2016, Appleton self published Now or Never, an autobiographical account of his time spent in the orbit of celebrities.
