= Wardmote =

A wardmote was a meeting of the inhabitants of a ward, or a court held in the ward, to try defaults in matters relating to the watch, police, and the like.

The term is used in York, London, and Faversham, and was also used by the Chartists.

== City of London ==
Wardmotes still take place once a year in each of the 25 wards of the City of London.

The wardmotes are traditionally opened by a proclamation from the ward beadle, for example:

Oyez! Oyez! Oyez! All manner of persons having to do at this Court of Wardmote for the Ward of Tower holden here this day before the Worshipful Alderman Sir Paul Judge of this Ward, draw near and give your attendance. God Save The King.

The wardmotes are traditionally closed by a proclamation from the beadle, for example:

Oyez! Oyez! Oyez! All ye good people of the Ward of Tower summoned here to this Wardmote may now depart hence and give your attendance when again summoned. And hereof fail not. God Save The King.
