= Town crier =

Messenger of public announcements

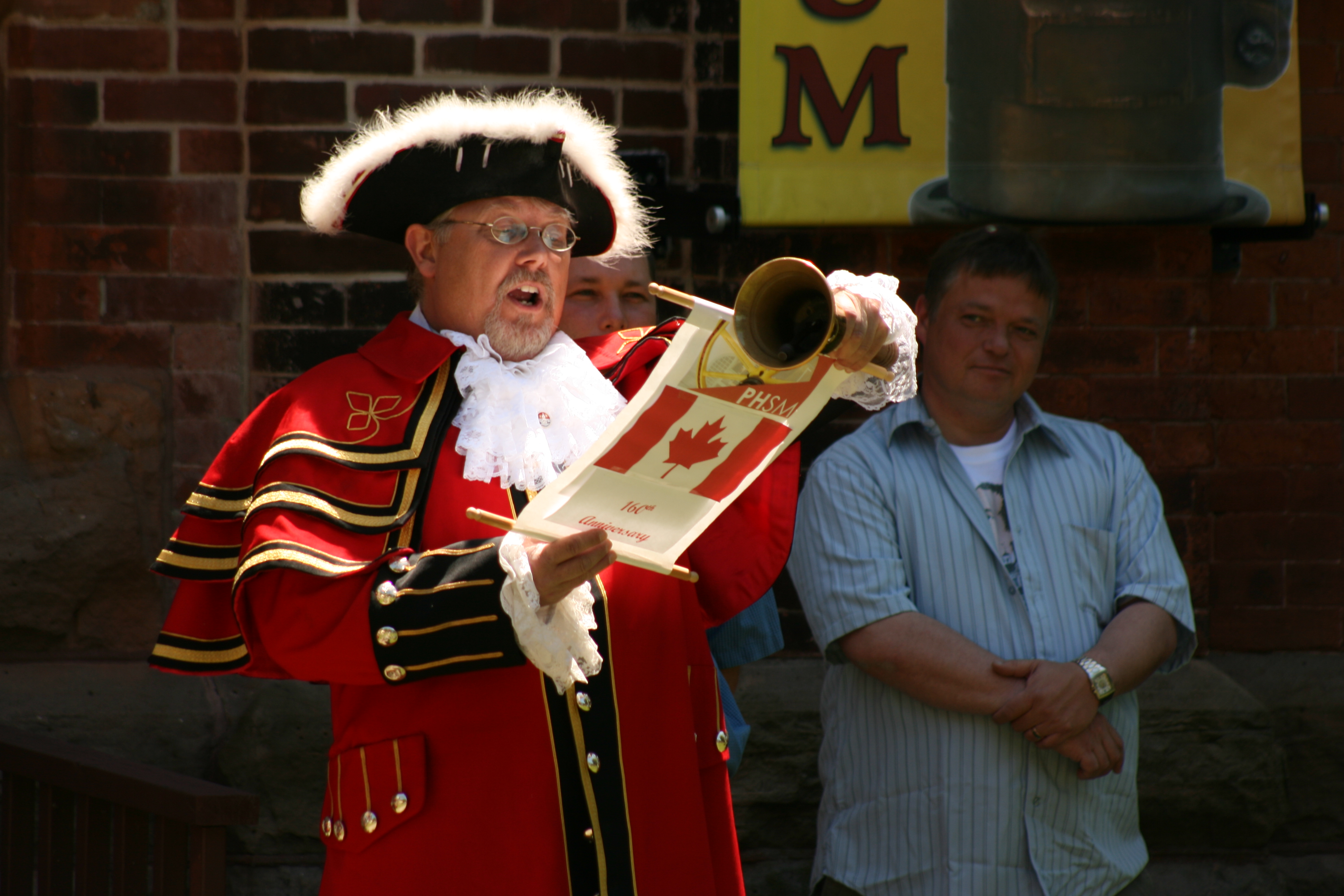
- A town crier in Kingston, Ontario, 2009

Occupation
- Activity sectors: Civil service

A town crier, also called a bellman, is an officer of a royal court or public authority who makes public pronouncements as required.

== Duties and functions ==
The town crier was used to make public announcements in the streets. Criers often dressed elaborately, by a tradition dating to the 18th century, in a red and gold coat, white breeches, black boots and a tricorne hat.

In English-speaking countries, they carried a handbell to attract people's attention, as they shouted the words "Oyez, Oyez, Oyez!" before making their announcements. The word "Oyez" means "hear ye," which is a call for silence and attention. Oyez derives from the Anglo-Norman word for listen (modern French, oyez, infinitive, ouïr, but has been largely replaced by the verb écouter). The proclamations book in Chester from the early 19th century records this as "O Yes, O Yes!".

== History ==
=== Europe ===
Prior to widespread literacy, town criers were the means of communication with the people of the town since many people could not read or write. Proclamations, local bylaws, market days, advertisements, were all proclaimed by a bellman or crier.

In ancient Rome, they typically proclaimed public business during the market days that formed a kind of weekend every eight days.

In Goslar, Germany, a crier was employed to remind the local populace not to urinate or defecate in the river the day before water was drawn for brewing beer.

Bells were frequently used to attract attention, but not always – in the Netherlands, a gong was the instrument of choice for many, and a drum or a hunting horn was used in France.

In the observance of Allhallowtide, "it was customary for criers dressed in black to parade the streets, ringing a bell of mournful sound and calling on all good Christians to remember the poor souls."

==== Britain ====
In order to gain the attention of the crowd, the crier would yell, "Hear ye" – "Oyez".

In medieval England, town criers were the chief means of news communication with the townspeople, since many were illiterate in a period before the moveable type was invented. Royal proclamations, local bylaws, market days, advertisements, even selling loaves of sugar were all proclaimed by a bellman or crier throughout the centuries—at Christmas 1798, the Chester Canal Company sold some sugar damaged in their packet boat and this was to be advertised by the bellman.

The crier also escorted the destitute to the workhouse, installed minor criminals in the stocks and administered floggings. During public hangings he read out why the person was being hanged, and helped to cut him or her down.

Chester records of 1540 show fees due to the bellman included:

of every worshipful gentyllman that goyth onye gounes at ther buryall ...one goune [at funerals gowns would be given to mourners]. when he gythe or aneything that is lost ...jd [one penny]. for every bote lode with powder mellwylle [salted fish] ...one fyshe, for every boute lode with fresh fyshe that he goeth for ...jd [one penny].

In 1620, there was a fight at the Chester cross between the butchers and the bakers where the "Cryer brake his Mace in peeces Amonge them". In 1607, one public notice read by George Tunnall, the bellman, forbade tipping rubbish in the river.

In 1715, a local man recorded that the:

Belman at the Cross … Reads publicly a proclamation in the Mayor's name, commanding all persons in the City to be of peaceable and civil behaviour, not to walk around the Streets or Rows at unreasonable hours of night.

Salmon fishing season was also closed by the bellman.

The term "Posting A Notice" comes from the act of the town crier, who having read his message to the townspeople, would attach it to the door post of the local inn. Some newspapers took the name "The Post" for this reason.

Town criers were protected by law, as they sometimes brought bad news such as tax increases. Anything done by the town crier was done in the name of the ruling monarch and harming a town crier was considered to be treason. The phrase "don't shoot the messenger" was a real command.

There are two organisations representing town criers including the Ancient and Honourable Guild of Town Criers and Loyal Company of Town Criers.

A copy of a royal proclamation announcing the dissolution of the Parliament of the United Kingdom is delivered by hand from the Privy Council Office to Mansion House in the City of London. It is then read out by the Common Crier of the City on the steps of the Royal Exchange in the heart of the City, having been handed to him by the Common Serjeant of the City, ahead of the proclamation also being read out in the London boroughs.

Beetty Dick (1693–1773) was a woman town crier in Dalkeith, Midlothian, Scotland, in the mid 18th century, succeeded by three further women town criers.

=== Americas ===
There have been town criers in North America ever since Europeans have been coming to the continent, and the First Nations peoples including the Nakota and Comanches have had the eyapaha (village crier). There are records throughout the 16th century of town criers in Mexico, Peru, and Panama. During the 1830s and 40s Halifax, Nova Scotia had as many as four in the city. All through the American Colonies and beyond, such as Santa Fe, New Mexico; Boston, Massachusetts and Stamford, Connecticut had criers during the mid 17th century. In some places, the office of town crier persisted into the early 20th century. At least as recently as 1904, Los Angeles and several adjacent towns had official town criers.

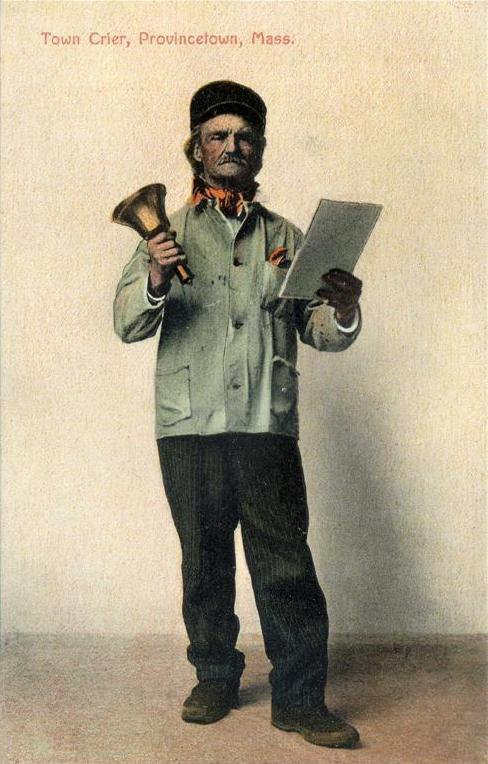
Town crier of Provincetown, Massachusetts, in 1909

The town of Provincetown, Massachusetts, has had an active Town Crier from the 1840s up to the present day.

=== Asia ===
==== India ====
In many parts of India, the village crier traditionally carried a rustic drum to call public attention, following up with the message.

==== Nepal ====
In Nepal, the town crier is called a katuwal which derives from local Tibetic, kat 'voice' + an Indic suffix -wal 'kind of a person

==== Sri Lanka ====
In Sri Lanka, traditionally criers would carry a specific drum to call public attention (called tom-tom beating), following up with the message. The practice dates back from ancient times as it was used by Sri Lankan kingdoms through the colonial period up on to the modern times and was known as Ana Bera (Announcement drum beating). The practice was used by municipal or village councils until the late ninetieth century when the practice was replaced by modern communication mediums. The use of a tom-tom beating announcer is still defined in legal statutes for situations for public notification in situations such as partition of lands. It is however not practiced.

=== Africa ===
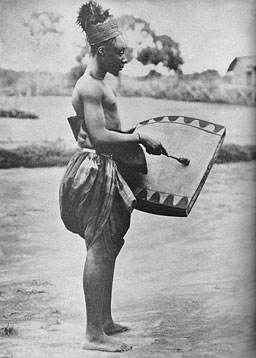
Congolese town crier

Town criers were prominent in the precolonial and colonial eras of Igboland, a West African region in the present-day Nigeria. They served as the major means of information dissemination in their respective communities.

== Modern town criers ==
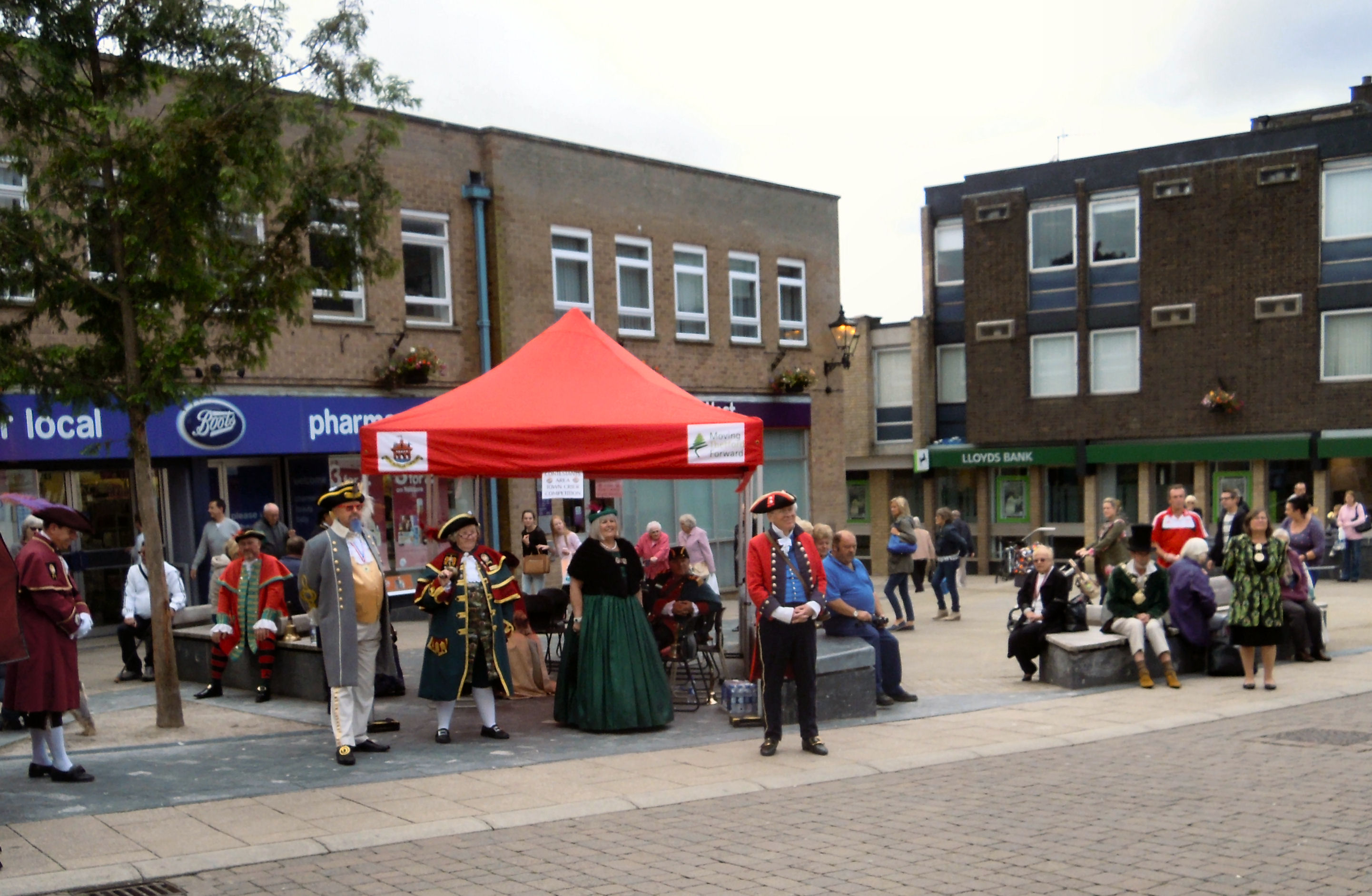
A town criers competition in Thetford in 2015

When the need for a town crier disappeared, the position passed into local folklore. Informal and later formal town crier competitions were held from the early 20th century. Subsequently, some cities and towns reinstated the post purely for ceremonial purposes. As of 2024 there were "about 350".

Many local councils in England and Wales reinstated the post of town crier from the mid-1990s onwards (e.g. Chester). Many are honorary appointments or employed part-time by the council. In October 2010, there were 144 towns in England and Wales with town criers registered with the Ancient and Honourable Guild of Town Criers. They mainly perform ceremonial duties at civic functions. Local councils with a paid town crier often make them available for charity events.

In the Royal Borough of Kingston upon Thames, the town crier is also appointed the tipstaff, an appointment which exists in no other local council.

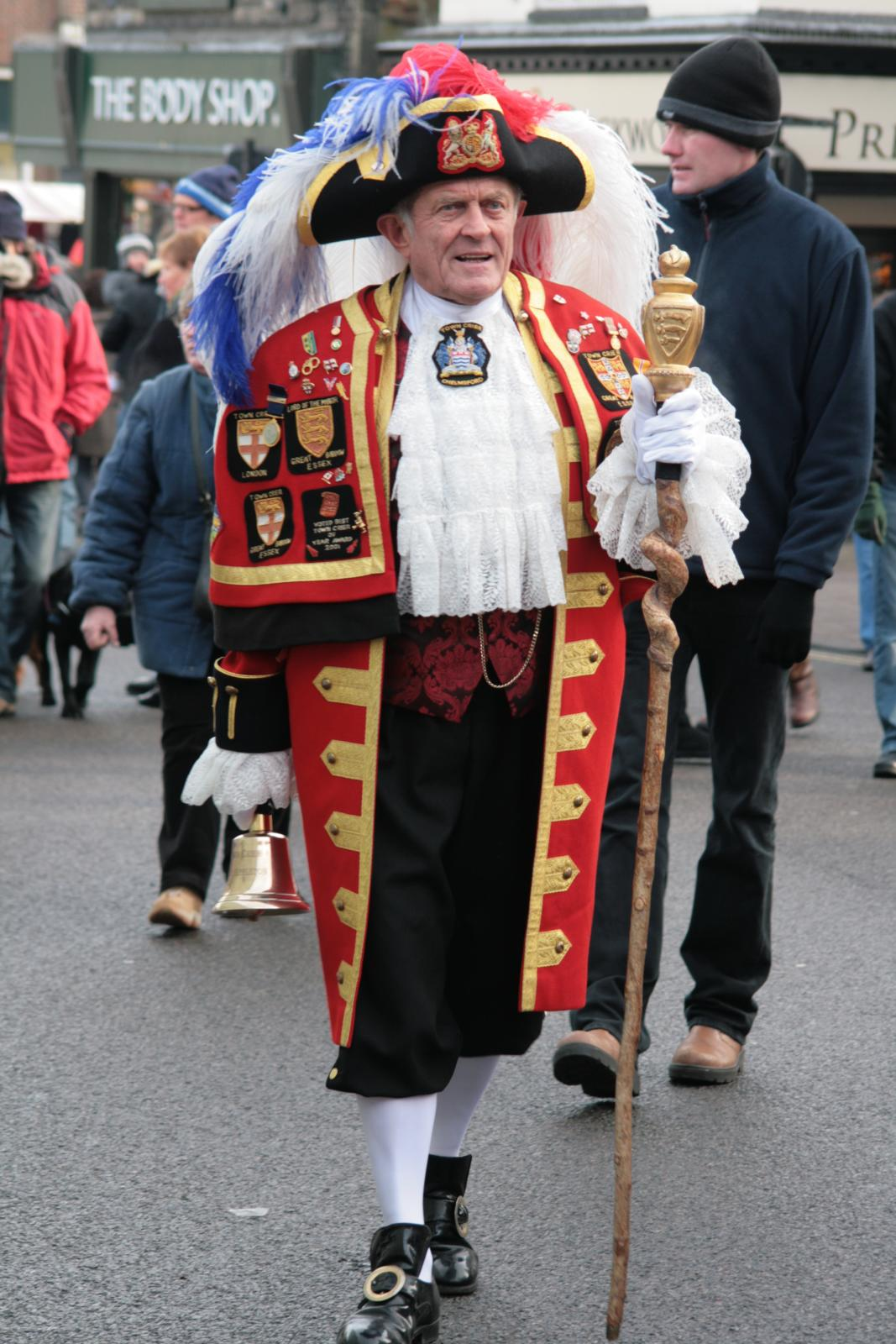
Town crier Tony Appleton, Bury St Edmunds, UK

In England, town criers still announce the births of royal heirs and occasionally the arrival of the royal family. Tony Appleton, an octogenarian and self-proclaimed “royalist crier,” took it upon himself to announce, as loudly as he can, important news about the royal family. Appleton has served as town crier for the nearby town of Romford, but he does not represent the royal family. Appleton admitted as much in 2013, when news outlets were confused by his presence.

There are several town crier guilds in both Canada and the United States. These include the Ontario Guild of Town Criers, the Nova Scotia Guild of Town Criers and the American Guild of Town Criers. In 2016, the town of Burlingame, California, added a town crier.

As of February 2026, over 25 Australian local councils have official town criers, including the City of Brisbane (Queensland capital), City of Sydney (New South Wales capital), and the Australian Capital Territory.

=== Competitions and records ===
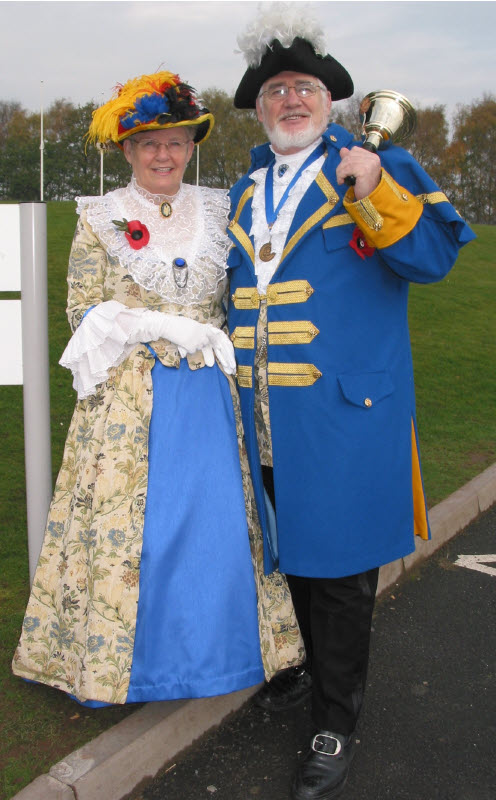
Peter & Maureen Taunton won a Best dressed crier & lady competition in 2008.

European, Canadian, American, North American and Australian championships are held in alternating years with the World Championships.

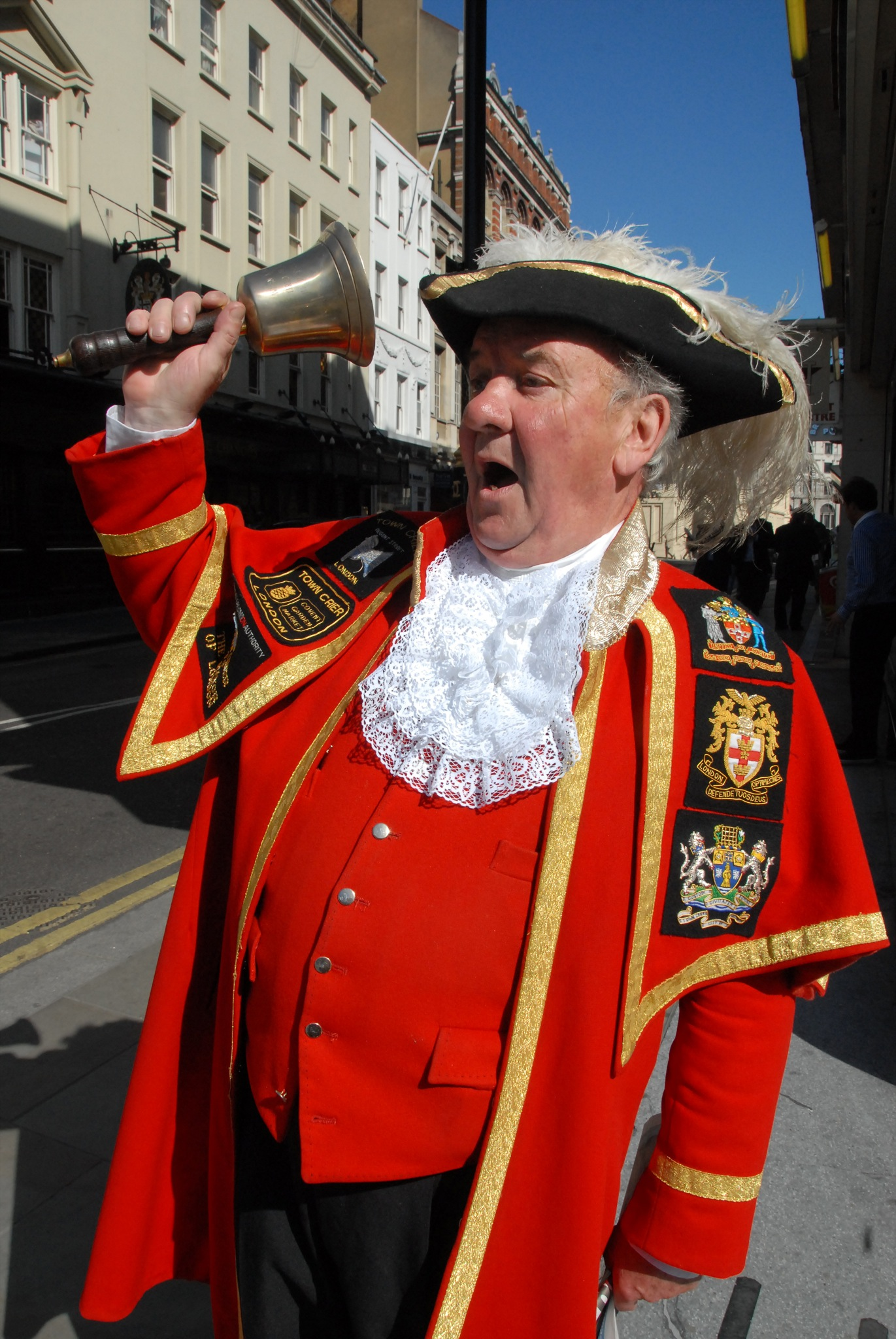
Peter Moore, the Town Crier to the Mayor of London and the Greater London Authority

The best dressed town crier at the World Championships in 2008 was Daniel Richer dit La Flêche representing the cities of Ottawa and Gatineau, in Canada.

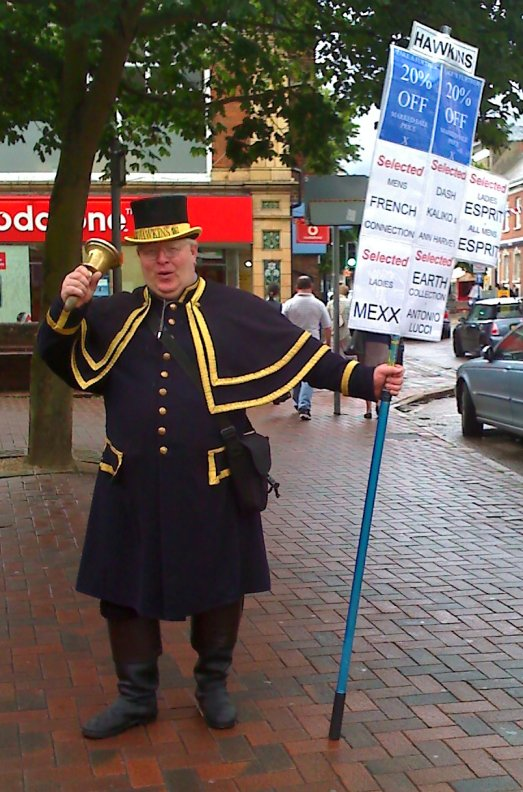
In 2001, Alan Myatt held the Guinness record for the world's loudest man.

The Best Dressed Couple were Peter and Maureen Taunton from the county town of Stafford, in Staffordshire, England. Richard Riddell of Anacortes, in the state of Washington in the United States, was the 2008 American Champion and winner of the 2009 Bermuda International Town Crier Competition. He was awarded Best Dressed and tied for First Runner-up at the 2010 World Tournament at Chester in England and Overall Winner at the 2013 World Invitational Town Crier Competition held in Kingston, in Ontario, Canada.

Peter Moore, the London Town Crier, held the position for more than 30 years. He was Town Crier to the Mayor of London, the City of Westminster, and London boroughs, and was also a freeman and liveryman of the City of London. He died on 20 December 2009.

Alan Myatt held two Guinness World Records. As well as being the loudest crier (recording a cry of 112.8 decibels), he also set the record for vocal endurance, issuing a one-hundred word proclamation every 15 minutes for a period of 48 hours. His record was beaten by Joseph McGrail-Bateup, the honorary town crier of Canberra, Australia, who recorded 122.4 decibels in 2026.

Daniel Richer dit La Flêche, who is a member of the First Nations Abenaki tribe, is a full-time bilingual town crier. David Hinde, Bridlington Town Crier, was measured at 114.8 decibels.

Taking place from the 20th to 23 August 2014, Chris Whyman from Kingston, Ontario, Canada, was declared the winner of the 2014 World Town Crier Tournament in Chester.

== See also ==
- Dead bell, used to announce deaths and funerals.
- Street cries
- Message stick
- Umalohokan
- Vic Garth, reputed in 2005 to be the oldest town crier in the world.
- Knocker-up, the antiquated profession of human alarm clock.
- List of obsolete occupations
