= Peter Moore (town crier) =

British town crier (1939–2009)

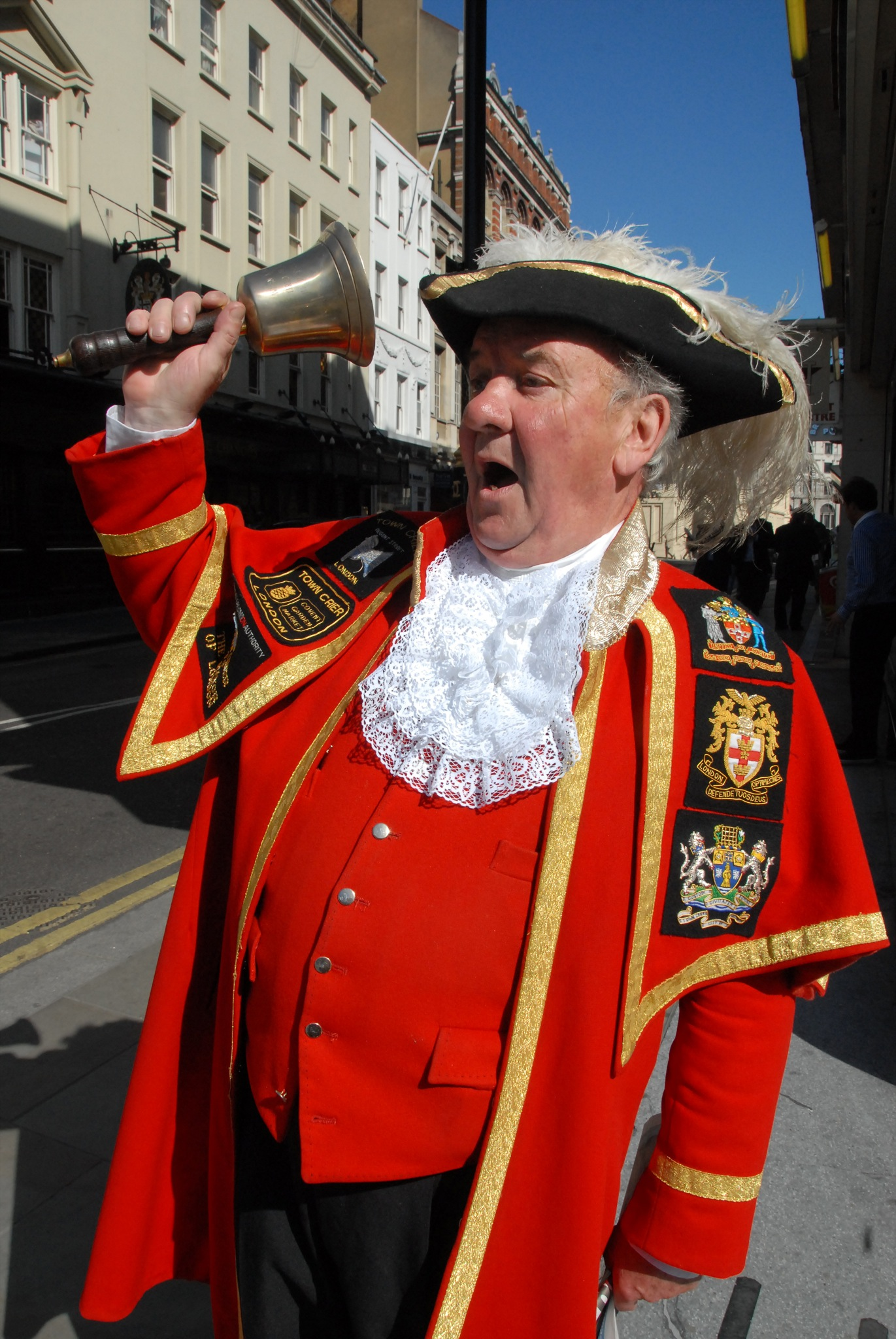
- Peter Moore, Town Crier to the Mayor of London and the Greater London Authority, in 2007
- Born: 29 August 1939; Walsall, Staffordshire, England
- Died: 20 December 2009 (aged 70); Wandsworth, London, England
- Occupation: town crier

Peter Moore (29 August 1939 – 20 December 2009) was a British town crier. He worked for the London Tourist Board, the Mayor of London, the cities of London and Westminster.

== Life ==
Moore was born in Walsall, Staffordshire (now West Midlands), England, to a "father unknown". He was raised in a nearby Barnardo's Home. He left Walsall for London, and became an actor. He was cast in the original 1960 stage production of Lionel Bart's Oliver!, as the undertaker Mr. Sowerberry. Later, impresario Bernard Delfont swore him in as a town crier in the Piccadilly Circus. He was called on by Ken Livingstone, Leader of the Greater London Council, to promote parades in the South Bank.

Peter spent 31 years as the official Town Crier of London, and was also the town crier to the mayor of London, the Greater London Authority, the city of Westminster and the London borough of Merton. Moore announced the 1982 birth of Prince William of Wales outside the gates of Buckingham Palace.

Moore was a well-known figure in London, often seen at various locations such as Covent Garden, Trafalgar Square, The Tower of London, Parliament Square, or Piccadilly Circus. Peter had a deep love and fondness of London, often shown when quoting Dr Samuel Johnson, "When a man is tired of London, he is tired of life, for in London there is all that life can afford."

=== Stolen bell ===
In December 2001, while assisting tourists with directions to 10 Downing Street, Moore's bell was stolen when he put it on the ground. The bell was replaced with one from the Whitechapel Bell Foundry, makers also of the American Liberty Bell.

== Death ==
Moore died of a heart attack on 20 December 2009, at his home in Wandsworth, South London, aged 70. "He had been told that his heart was very weak but he never gave up doing his town crying," his former partner Maxine Howard said. "Peter was a trooper, a workaholic. He was a people person. He just adored London." On 18 January 2010, friends, family, and colleagues celebrated Moore at St. George's Cathedral in Southwark, Central London. At the requiem, held the same day, fellow town criers and colleagues from across England paid tribute to him. Later, at the London New Year's Day Parade, his presence was replaced with a shouted "welcome", pre-recorded by him before his death. He is survived by his wife, Maxine Howard, and his son Jamie, who accepted a lifetime achievement award at the parade, in place of his father.
