= Alan Myatt =

English town crier

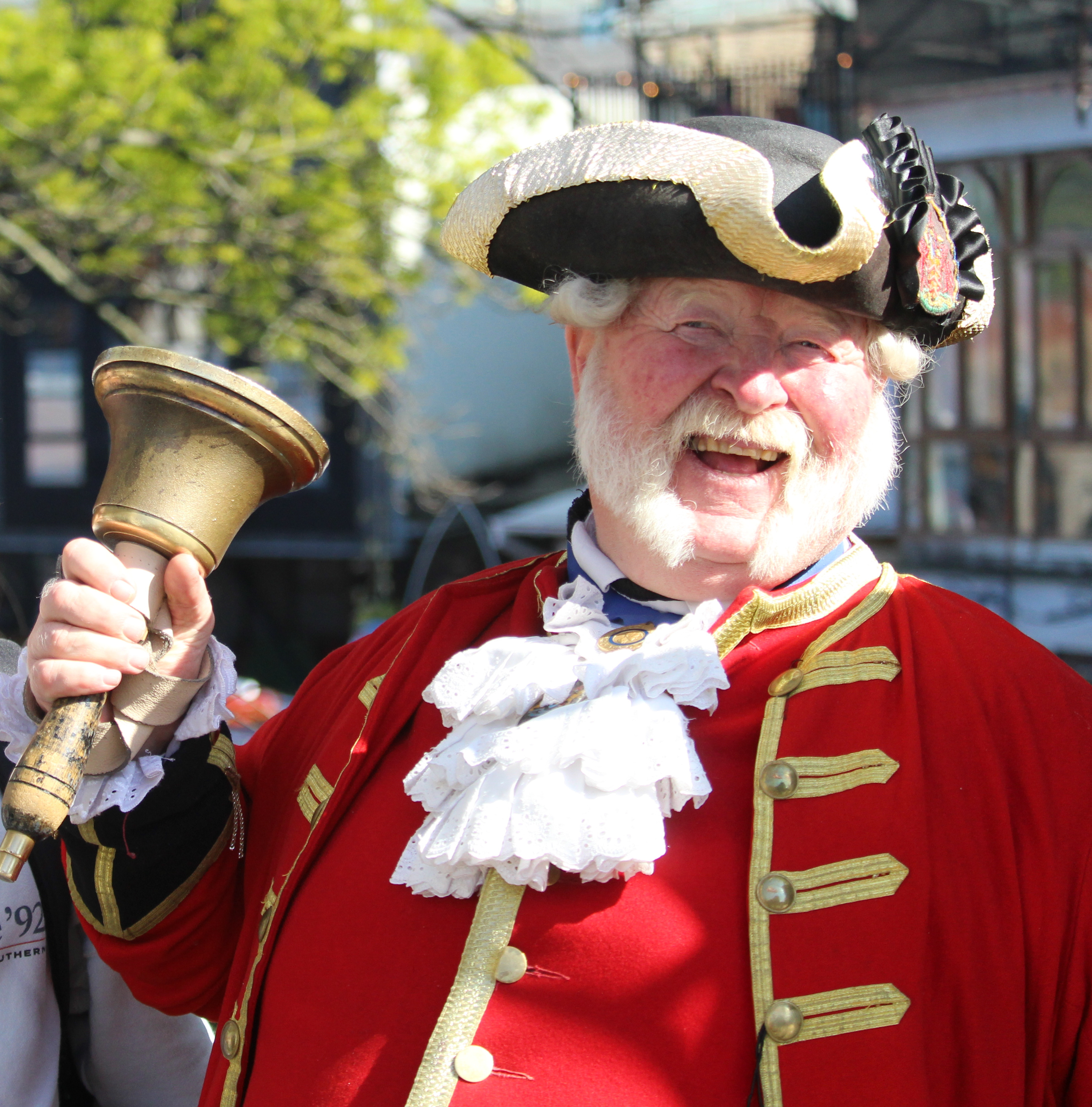
- Alan Myatt in Camden Town in 2025
- Born: 1957 (age 68–69)
- Occupations: Town crier, toastmaster, master of ceremonies, themed character actor
- Awards: Guinness World Records for loudest town crier and vocal endurance
- Website: www.thememan.co.uk

Alan Myatt (born 1957) is an English town crier. He has set two Guinness World Records: the loudest crier, recording a cry of 112.8 decibels, and the Guinness world record for vocal endurance, issuing a one-hundred word proclamation every 15 minutes for a period of 48 hours.

== Early life ==
A native of Gloucester, Myatt was born in the former Gloucester Royal Infirmary in Southgate Street in 1957 and grew up on Park End Road in the city. He attended a special boarding school in Exeter owing to concerns over his eyesight. On leaving school he worked in various trades before becoming a labourer on a building site. In the evenings he was a member of the amateur company the Gloucester Operatic and Drama Society with whom he performed during the mid-1980s. In 1989 he took part in a competition to find a town crier for Gloucester - and won.

== Career ==
He is a crier to commerce, industry and heritage, and can be seen at exhibitions, promotions and trade fairs across Europe. He is also a toastmaster, master of ceremonies and themed character actor.

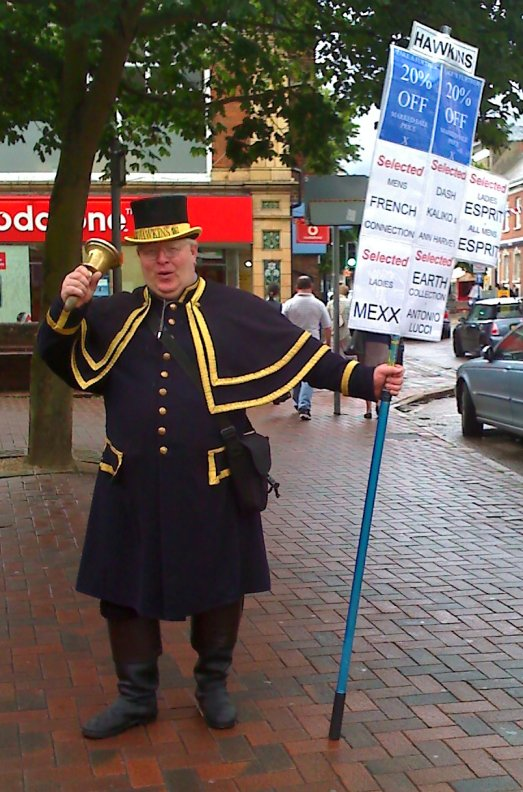
Myatt in Hitchin, Hertfordshire in 2009

He is the official town crier for the City of Gloucester, for Letchworth Garden City and Hitchin in Hertfordshire, for London's Covent Garden and also for various venues in the capital including the Stables Market in Camden Town.

In July 2015 he crossed the English Channel to France in an attempt to be the first British town crier since 1066 to make an announcement on the French side of the water.

Myatt is a member of the Ancient and Honourable Guild of Town Criers.
