= Slave-owning slaves =

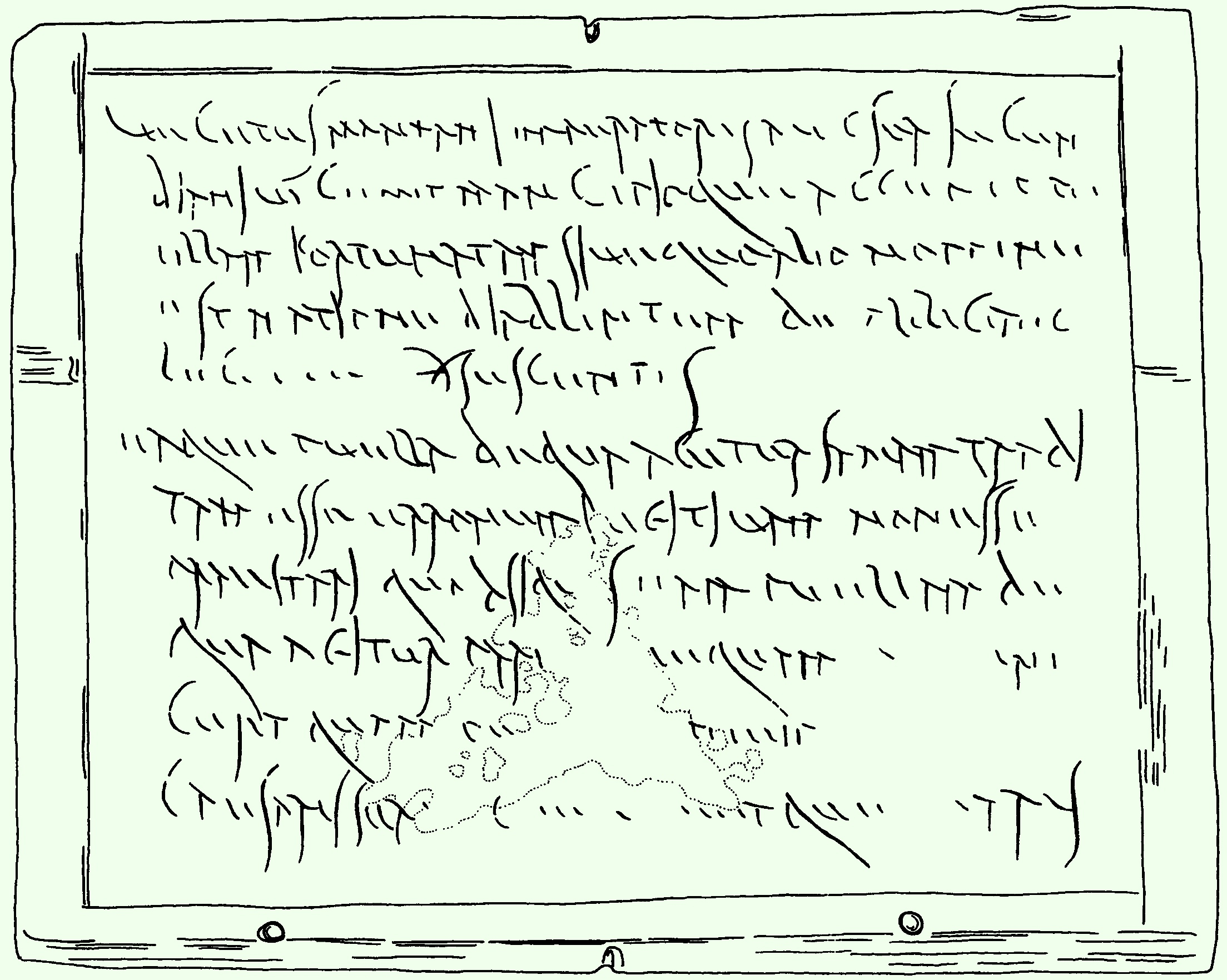
Fortunata, slave of a slave of a slave. Contract for her purchase, Roman London, c. 90 AD, dug up at No 1 Poultry in 1994, as deciphered by Roger Tomlin.

In some human societies throughout history, there existed enslaved people who owned enslaved people. Details of these arrangements varied greatly, but it is possible to identify two broad cases: peculium slavery and elite political slavery.

In Ancient Rome, a peculium was an enslaved person's informal property. Enslaved people were considered property by Roman law, and thus could themselves not own any possessions. However, in everyday Roman life, a large volume of business was overseen by enslaved people, which suited their masters as it freed them to attend to other responsibilities. Thus, an astute slave could save money from such transactions and might buy additional enslaved people, who could assist with business transactions or menial work; in this way there could exist enslaved people who owned enslaved people. The enslaved person overseeing the business operations, unless liberated, was still considered property of their master by law, despite functioning in society similarly to a free citizen. Similar practices to this could be found in Jewish law, slave-era Brazil, Africa, China, and, to a lesser extent, in North America.

In some polities, rulers preferred to appoint enslaved people as government officials, as they were more easily controllable. In the most developed form of this practice, the enslaved person would be separated from their parents at a young age — in some cases, castrated — and brought up in the royal household, knowing no other loyalty. Accordingly, enslaved people of significant ability were gradually promoted to positions of great trust, including military command, management of palace affairs, and sometimes high political office. It was possible for enslaved people to own enslaved people in these situations. As with peculium slavery, unless the ruler chose to liberate the enslaved person, they remained enslaved, and could be degraded, tortured, or killed at the order of the ruler. Societies which practiced this form of slavery existed in the Islamic world, including the Ottoman Empire, Mughal India, and large portions of West Africa, along with early modern Russia and imperial China.

== Introduction ==
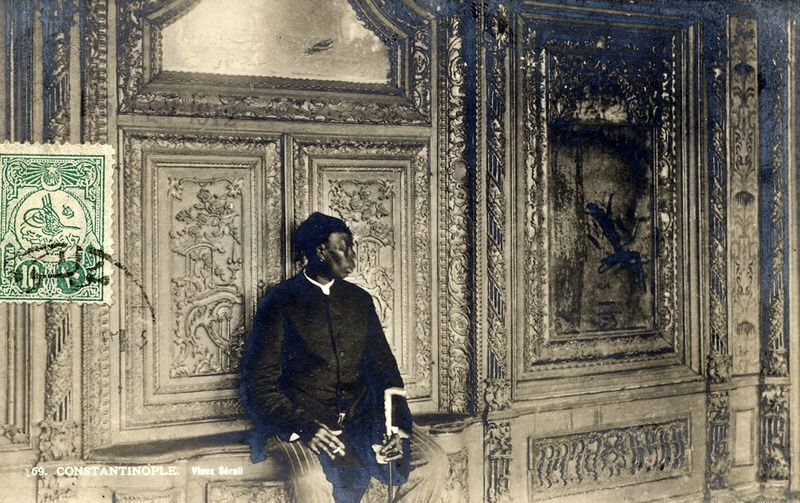
The Chief Black Eunuch, slave, but a powerful man in the Ottoman Empire (1912 postcard)

That slaves acquired slaves of their own may seem surprising to Westerners. But their understanding of slavery has been dominated by a stereotype drawn from the plantation economy of the Americas, which was not typical of all times and places.

In his "ground-breaking" comparative study Slavery and Social Death (1982), Jamaican scholar Orlando Patterson wrote:

The servus vicarius (slave of a slave) was a universal occurrence. I know of no slave society in which slaves who could afford them were denied the purchase of other slaves.

Patterson did not undertake to prove his claim systematically since it was not central to his book. This article has been compiled from a diversity of secondary sources; they seem to show that slave-owning slaves can indeed be found in many eras and cultures, though not universally (and though eventually forbidden in Russia).

=== Historical sources for scholars ===
Most slaves are completely forgotten. A given person could be the slave of a slave without it leaving a trace. For example, classical Chinese historians—thorough and painstaking—did not conceive it was part of their duty to record the doings of low persons; when they mention slavery, it is by chance. Slavery is far better known to us from Roman sources, and this for an unusual combination of circumstances.

First, though Roman slaves had no rights themselves their doings were continually affecting those who did. It immensely complicated Roman law. Roman jurists wrote about it abundantly; "there are few branches of the law in which the slave does not prominently appear". Many fragments of their writings have been preserved.

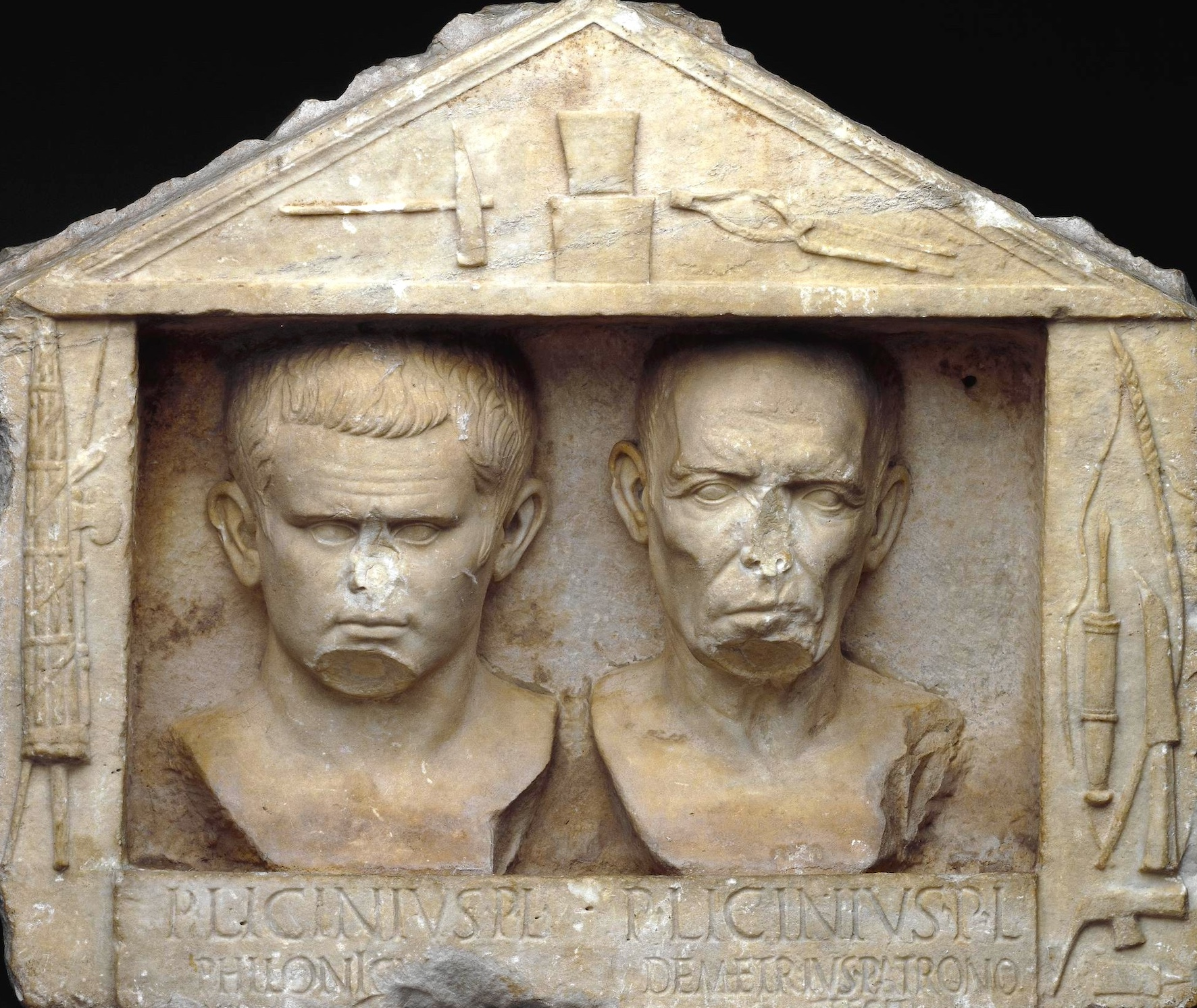
Two skilled ex-slaves acknowledge their master for setting them free (British Museum). Public inscriptions like this were expected and are an important source for scholars.

Secondly, there was a peculiar funeral custom. Roman slaves, after years of labour for their owners, were fairly often manumitted (liberated). They were expected to be grateful, and show it, by leaving a suitable funerary inscription, with biographical details. Freed slaves were glad to go along with the custom since it showed their family had gone up in the world. Paradoxically, while ordinary free plebeians ended up packed into unmarked graves (“a uniform mass of black, viscid, pestilential, unctious matter”), ex-slaves commemorated themselves in marble or other durable substances. Three-quarters of funerary inscriptions in Rome concern former slaves.

An astonishing number of these public inscriptions have survived; (and see below). Since 1853 German scholars have been recording every one of them (the Corpus Inscriptionum Latinarum, or CIL). They have been placed online. Then there are archaeological finds in all parts of the empire. Piecing these bits of information together scholars can learn that, for example, Fortunata, a slave girl in first-century London, was bought for a handsome sum by one Vegetus, a civil servant who was himself an official slave of Montanus, an important slave of the Roman emperor himself (title image, and below).

It seems that no other pre-modern society has such a density of detail survived. For the others, it is by chance that the records mention slaves, still less slaves of slaves. On the other hand, in the Islamic world some slaves became famous. In India, the slave of a slave became a king.

=== Definitions ===
What is a "slave" is endlessly debated, but is a matter of definition. In this article information is supplied in each pertinent section for the reader to judge.

The expression "slave of a slave" has also been used as a metaphor e.g. for a downtrodden way of life, or as a form of politeness (akin to the phrase "your humble servant").

== As part of an upwardly mobile slave's private fortune ==
Although the slave's peculium is best known from ancient Rome, the concept that even a slave could gradually acquire property, including slaves of his/her own, occurs spontaneously in other societies. For example, in Brazil and West Africa it seems that it was evolved by the slaves themselves, often as an emancipation strategy, rarely being mentioned by the elite.

=== Rome ===
==== Contradiction ====
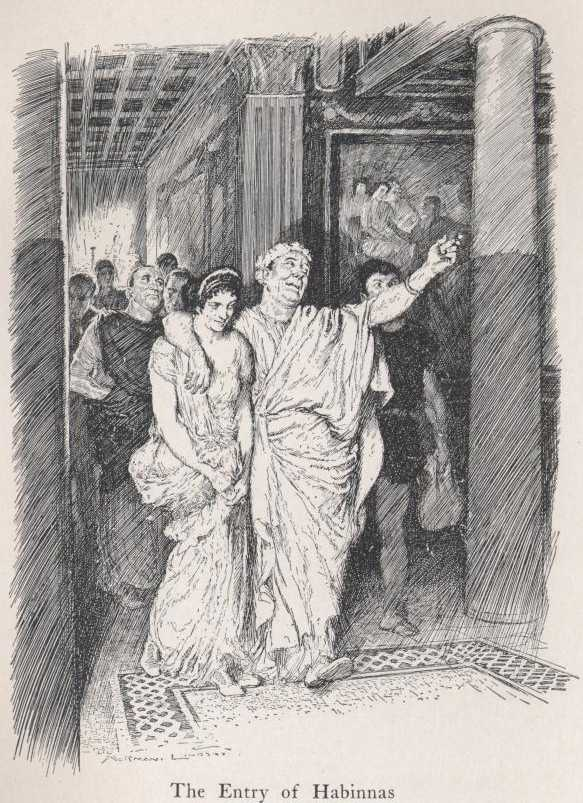
Rich ex-slaves arriving at their colleague Trimalchio's extravagant banquet (drawing by Norman Lindsay)

The legal status of slaves was abysmal and they could be treated with great cruelty (see next section). Yet it was a standing joke in Rome that some managed to buy their freedom and retire as rich men. There was even a law that said what was supposed to happen if an ex-slave died worth more than 100,000 sesterces. Some retired slaves bought their way into the upper ranks of society; it has been estimated that "about one fifth of the local aristocracy of Italy was descended from slaves". Since slaves were not supposed to be capable of owning property at all, the seeming contradiction should now be explained.

==== Status ====
In traditional Roman law (ius civile) slaves were not persons: they were things. They could not own property, contract a valid marriage, sue or be sued in a court of law nor give evidence (except under torture). In criminal cases (except high treason) slaves could not testify against their owners at all.

Slaves could be sold, sexually abused or accidentally beaten to death with impunity, or exposed to die when too old and worn out to serve. According to Jennifer Glancy,

An inscription from Puteoli details the job description of a manceps, a public official whose duties included torturing and even executing slaves on demand. Private citizens could hire the manceps to conduct the desired torture of their slaves; the manceps would supply the necessary equipment.

Ordinary human decency, or enlightened self-interest, might well produce humane treatment; but there were practically no effective laws to enforce it. If there were laws that said a master must not deliberately kill or disable his own slave without cause, it was not out of pity for the slave: what was objected to was the wanton damage to heritable property.

In the Eastern Roman Empire under Christian emperors conditions improved in some respects; for example, slaves were forbidden to be forcibly prostituted, though they remained open to abuse and exploitation.

==== Slaves as business administrators ====
Large numbers of slaves were employed in a vast array of economic activities, including managing a business.

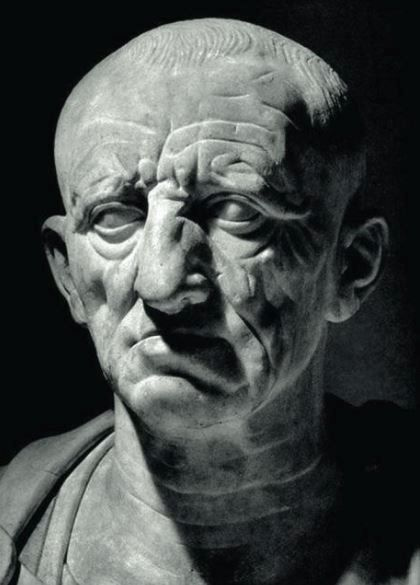
Marble bust, thought to be of Cato the Elder, who multiplied his fortune by employing slave businessmen

In Rome it was unseemly for the upper classes of society to engage in commerce. Yet some had large fortunes they meant to increase. Accordingly, they invested in agriculture and, as they acquired more farms, put in confidential slaves to manage them; or they invested in town houses and employed slaves as rent-collectors and property managers, or even set up slave physicians or theatrical performers. "In Rome, clerks, accountants, commercial agents, teachers, doctors, rhetoricians, and even superintendents, were predominantly slaves". Still other slaves were put to manage shops or factories, or supervise a moneylending business. "Slaves travelled to Africa or Gaul to collect debts, buy things, or run businesses". "As a general rule, supervision of the master's holdings was entrusted to an entire hierarchy of financial agents working in both city and country, who carried out the wishes of their dominus and whom we know from inscriptions".

If a master suspected his slaves were cheating him, he had the right to interrogate them under torture; he did not need a court order. Hence rich men increasingly relied on slaves to administer their affairs: "slaves even became the absolute rule when it came to the administration of money". It has been pointed out that most of the unjust servants mentioned in the Gospel of Matthew were managerial slaves of this class; the author takes it for granted they will be tortured with "weeping and gnashing of teeth". Yvon Thébert thought that, nevertheless, there were some free men (not many) who deliberately sold themselves into slavery in order to get lucrative jobs as business managers. An American economist could not believe managers were appointed from the enslaved classes and argued that they must have been free men who had volunteered for slave status.

A slave who was good at business management was much more valuable; hence some bright slave children were educated as skilled administrators, being taught to keep accounts and so forth.

There were slaves who were allowed to go into business for themselves, see next section, the master getting a cut of the profits. In this way masters indirectly benefited from activities which they could not, or would not, perform themselves. For example, Cato the Elder, being a senator, was legally forbidden to be a shipowner, so he appointed confidential slaves to do it for him, making a lot of money that way. According to the historian Plutarch, Cato

used to lend money also to those of his slaves who wished it, and they would buy boys with it, and after training and teaching them for a year, at Cato’s expense, would sell them again. Many of these boys Cato would retain for himself, reckoning to the credit of the slave the highest price bid for his boy.

He ran a paid brothel for his slaves; they were strictly forbidden to go elsewhere, wrote Plutarch.

==== Slaves' informal property: the peculium ====
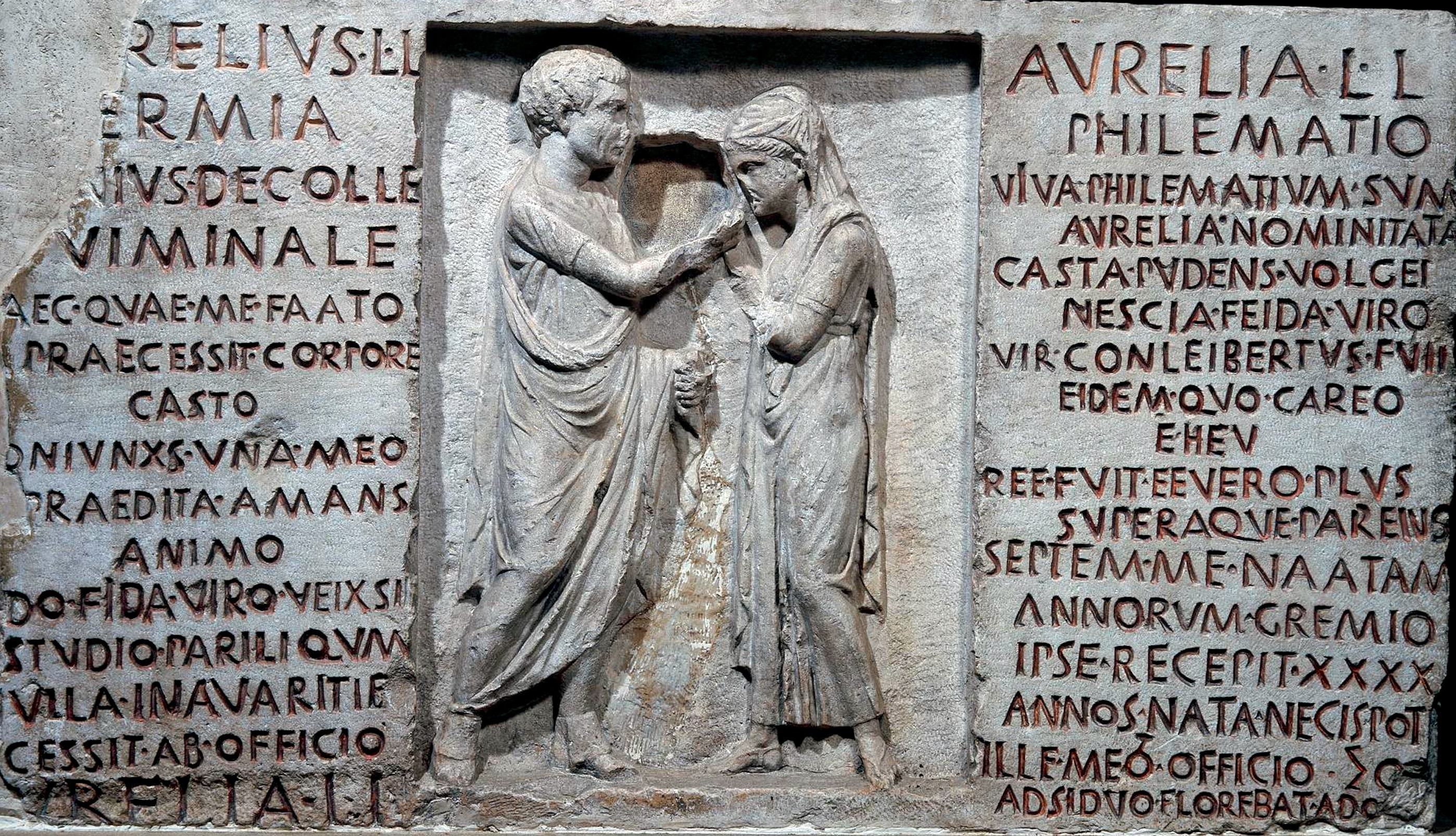
Freed slaves commemorate legitimate Roman marriage. This touching inscription ("He took me into his care at the age of seven.") hints she was originally part of his peculium. (British Museum.)

Already in the Roman Republic slaves were allowed to earn a peculium, which at first was just an informal fund, like a child's allowance. Probably slaves had been 'buying' and 'selling' things informally long before the law had to grapple with the anomaly: they could own nothing, so how could they buy?

A peculium was whatever surplus a master allowed his slave to accumulate on the side, and could be inferred from his keeping a separate account with his master's permission. The fund could consist of any kind of wealth, including sub-slaves, who were called servi vicarii. (The head slave was called servus ordinarius.)

Masters believed that slaves, if allowed a peculium, would work harder. Also, slaves might be allowed to purchase their freedom one day; and those with large peculia could afford to pay more. Still further, and as noted, some masters allowed their slaves to go into business on their own, taking a share of the proceeds. A 2nd century text mentions venaliciarii: slaves who were in the business of buying and selling enslaved persons as merchandise. But a slave was less likely to work hard and take business risks in order to increase his peculium, if he thought his master might confiscate it. Masters could see this. Accordingly, in order to uphold their mutual expectations the peculium must become more than an informal concession, it must harden into something like a legal right. Yet slaves had no rights. To reconcile the contradiction was part of the subtlety of Roman law.

==== The peculium recognised in praetorial law ====
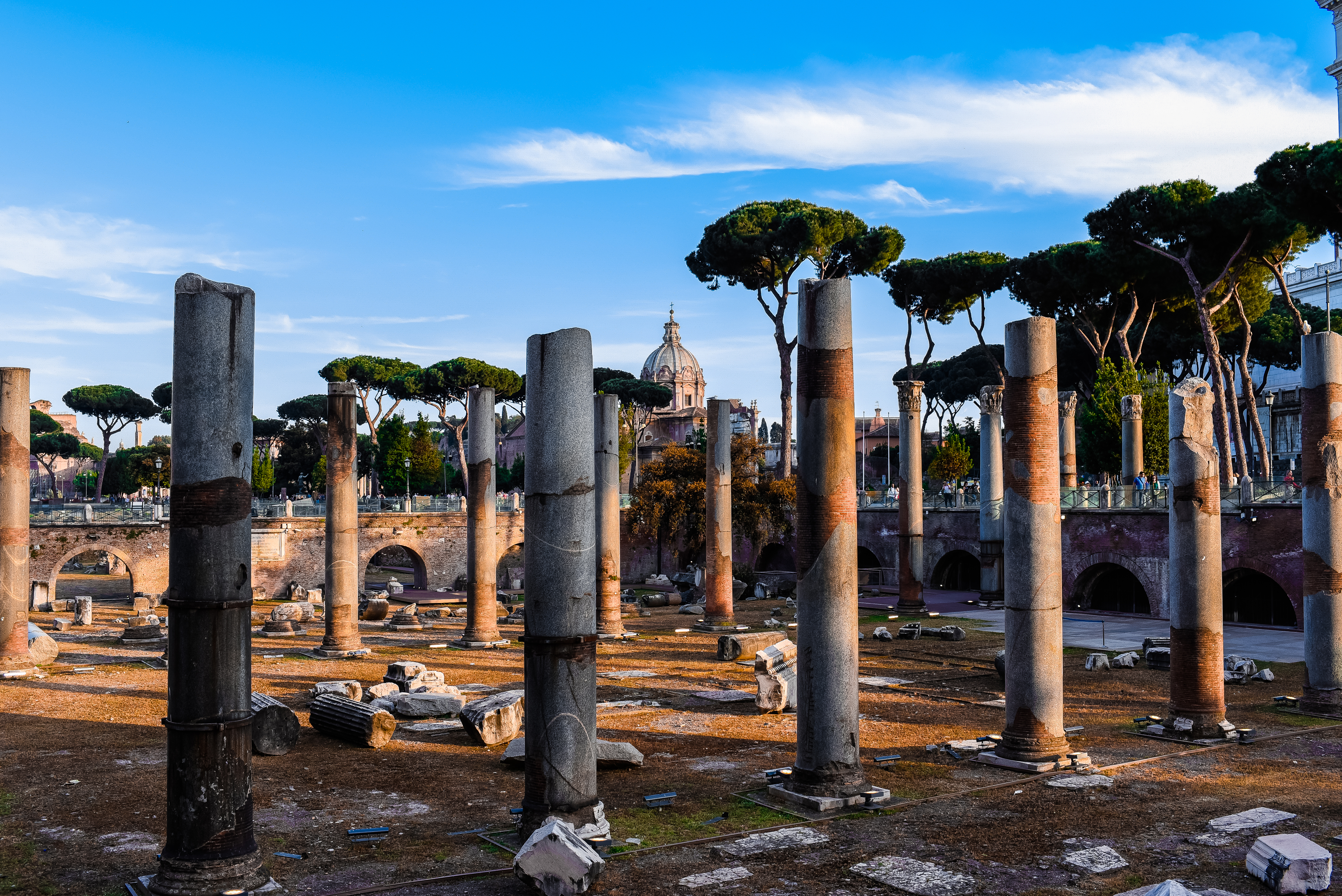
The Forum, Rome

The starting point was that a master who allowed his slave to go into business for himself was not liable for his slave's debts. So the slave's creditors had no recourse against the master. But since they could not sue the slave for non-payment either (for he was a non-person) this was deeply unattractive to third parties and discouraged commerce. The law had to be practical. Accordingly, the praetor evolved new legal remedies. One of these, called the actio de peculio, allowed creditors to sue the master himself, but only up to the value of the slave's peculium. Therefore, although there was nothing resembling modern company law in Rome, a similar advantage—trading with limited liability—could be achieved by using a slave to do the trading. It was possible for the slave to be owned jointly by a group of investors, making him even more like a modern corporate vehicle.

No wonder, therefore, that many Roman business enterprises—banks, factories, shops and even schools—were run by slaves acting as grantees of a peculium.

Be that as it may, the law had now formally recognised the existence of the slave's peculium. It has been said that the law created a fictitious person with legal identity: not the slave himself, but his peculium, which took on a life of its own. Nevertheless, the peculium was attached to the slave. That said, little more than a condensed version of Roman legal literature has survived, and the law of peculium is imperfectly understood.

What sort of master would allow his slave a large peculium—thus exposing himself to large liability? "Probably only a man of means, used to dealing with well-tested, trustworthy servants, and looking for business opportunities allowing for little—if any—supervision": men like Cato.

==== Retirement and manumission ====
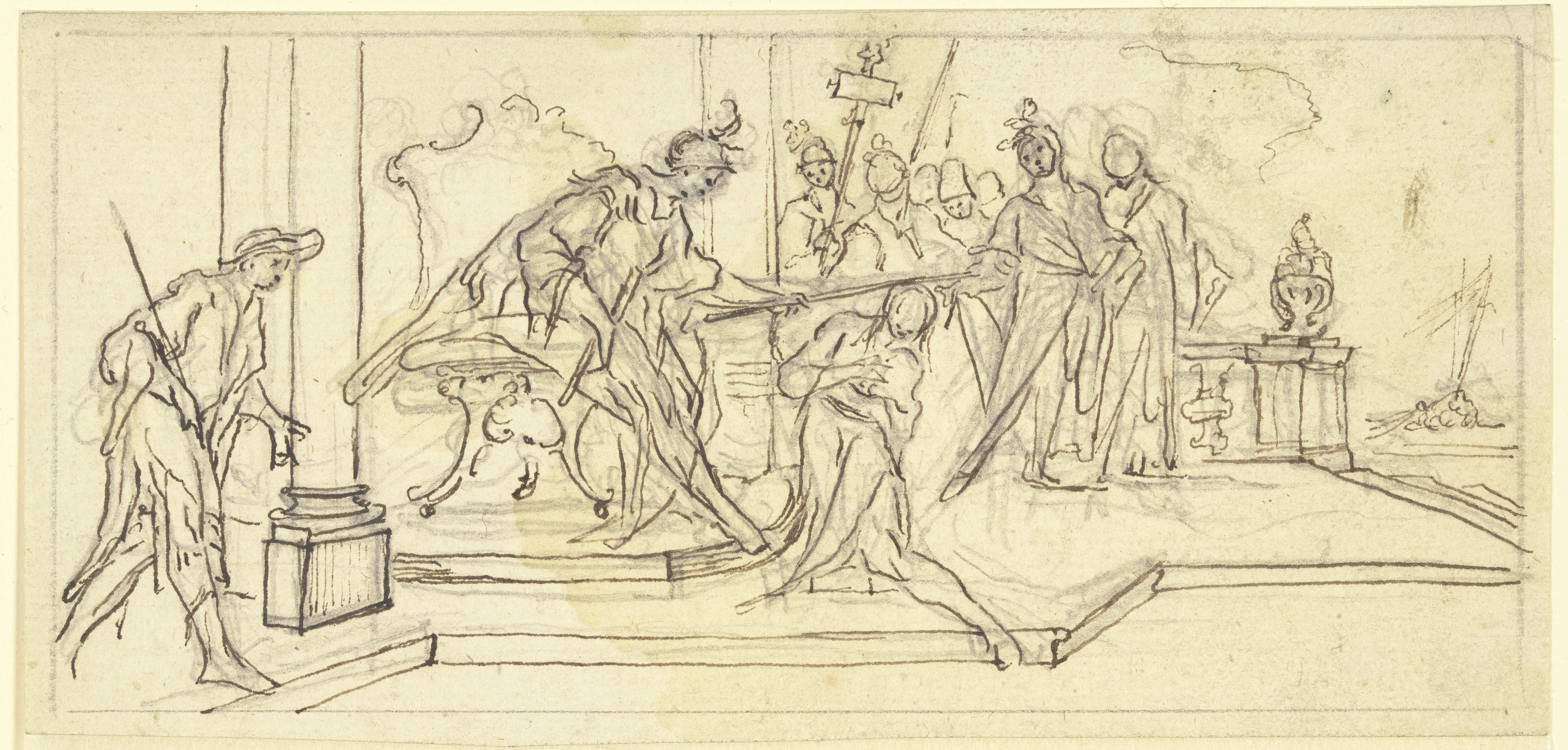
The Praetor manumitting a slave (Paul Egell, pen and ink, Städel)

Managerial slaves were often manumitted at the end of their careers, perhaps aged 30–40, and were expected to show gratitude to their patrons (obsequium) e.g. by naming them in their funerary inscriptions. Typically the freedmen in these inscriptions—a "staggering" 27,000 have been found—have Greek names. Most slaves in urban Rome originated from the Greek East, and were relatively well educated. Their fate was very different from the slaves who laboured in the Roman latifundia or mines. Those "would rather be dead than alive", wrote Diodorus Siculus. Even so, some managerial slaves were never freed. Freed slaves continued to owe certain financial obligations to their ex-owners.

It seems that masters and promising slaves took to making bargains. They agreed how much the slave would have to pay to be freed, and the slave proceeded to accumulate his peculium accordingly. Any surplus would represent the slave's retirement fund. The Romans made a business out of the granting of freedom. But since in law the peculium belonged to the master anyway, theoretically there was nothing to stop him from confiscating the peculium and refusing to liberate the slave. In reality, though, such a breach of faith would be deeply damaging to the master's financial credit, since it was to his interest that his slaves' peculia were known to be scrupulously honoured. Apparently, there is no record of such a confiscation. According to Tacitus an outraged slave killed his owner when he refused to free him at the agreed price. It was safer, and anyway morally approved in this society, to keep one's word.

==== Sub-slaves as part of a slave's peculium ====
As noted, slaves could themselves acquire slaves (servi vicarii), who might conceivably be put out to trade and earn a peculium of their own, perhaps acquiring sub-sub-slaves. According to Richard Gamauf, it could go this far:

Term	English meaning
servus ordinarius	regular slave
servus vicarius	slave's under-slave
servus vicarii vicarius	under-slave's under-slave
servus vicarius vicarii vicarii	under-slave of an under-slave's under-slave

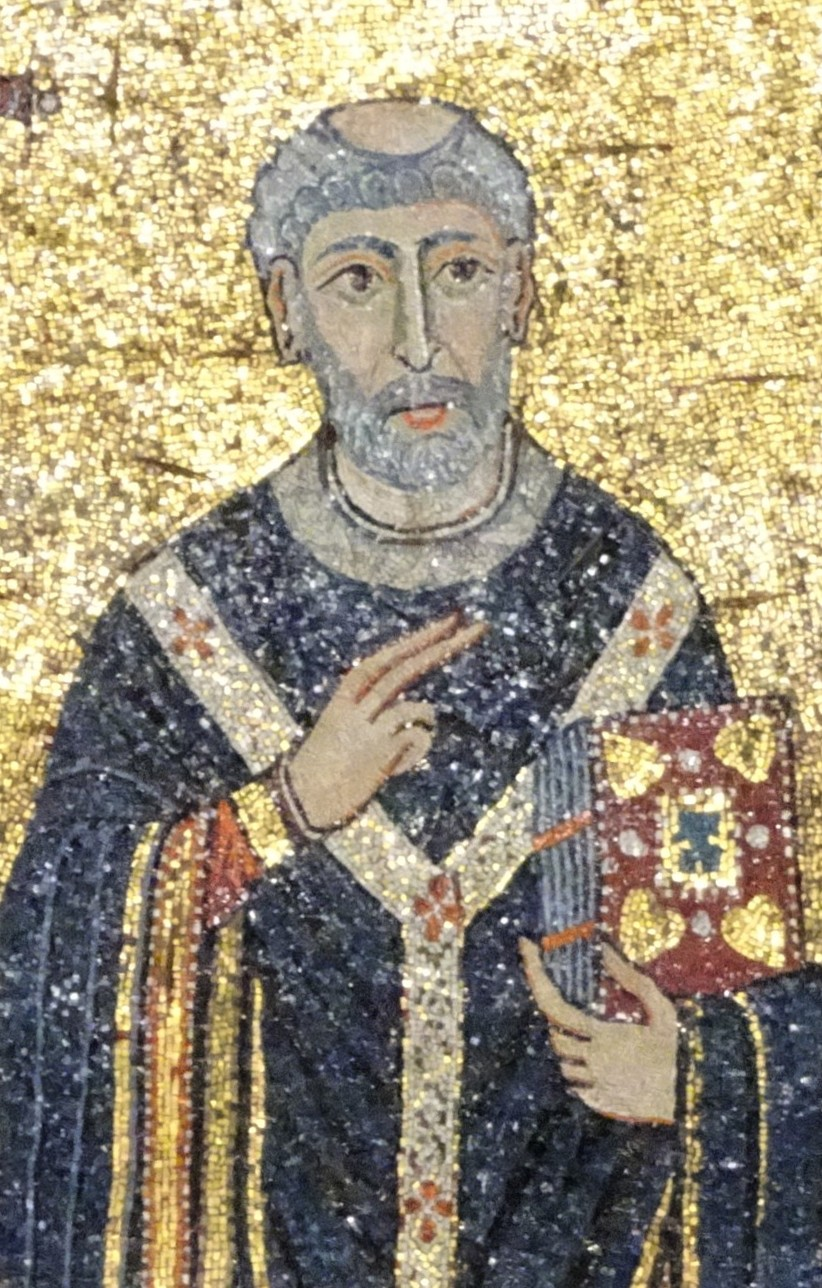
Pope Callixtus I, formerly a sub-sub-slave banker

Almost like in a pyramid scheme, he describes slaves with peculia as 'talent-scouts' looking to recruit promising subordinates; suitably trained, they will go out and recruit others. Subordinates look forward to promotion, which comes when a manumission creates a vacancy at the top of the chain. At the 'apex' stands the master.

It was to him that profits from all of the slaves and under-slaves were ultimately funnelled. He needed to know neither how many slaves he actually owned, nor how the members of his familia servorum operated at any given moment. He had no need to ensure, personally, the productivity of slaves (to him probably anonymous) in lower positions or on far-away estates. The servi ordinarii at each level took care of this.

The future Pope Callixtus I started as a sub-sub-slave. While young, he was given a sum of money by his enslaved owner and told to "bring him profits from banking deals", which he did. He became Pope in 217 CE.

To be owned by an enslaved person by no means guaranteed kind treatment. "Pomponius, a second-century jurist, mentions a slave who prostituted the ancillae (women-servants) who were part of his peculium".

In 1994 there was dug up in the City of London the remains of a Roman writing tablet. It proved to contain a fragment of a legal contract for the sale of a Gaulish girl called Fortunata. The buyer, who could afford to pay 600 denarii—two years' salary for a Roman soldier—was not only a slave himself, but was owned by another slave belonging to the Roman emperor, probably Domitian or Trajan. The vendor warranted that she was healthy and not "liable to wander or run away". The contract was dated to about AD 81–96.

The Swiss scholar Erman wrote a book called Servus Vicarius: L'Esclave de L'Esclave Romain (The Roman Slave's Slave) (Lausanne, 1896), still the only monograph on the subject. He thought a similar institution existed amongst the Egyptians, the Persians and the Greeks.

=== Jewish law ===
According to Talmud scholar Boaz Cohen, Jewish law had a concept somewhat similar to Roman peculium, called segullah. Thus the slave Ziba of King Saul owned 20 sub-slaves (2 Samuel 19:17). In ancient Hebrew society a slave counted in some respects as a member of the family. When Jerome came to translate the Hebrew Bible into the Latin Vulgate he rendered the word segullah as peculium, probably on the advice of Jewish scholars.

=== Brazil ===
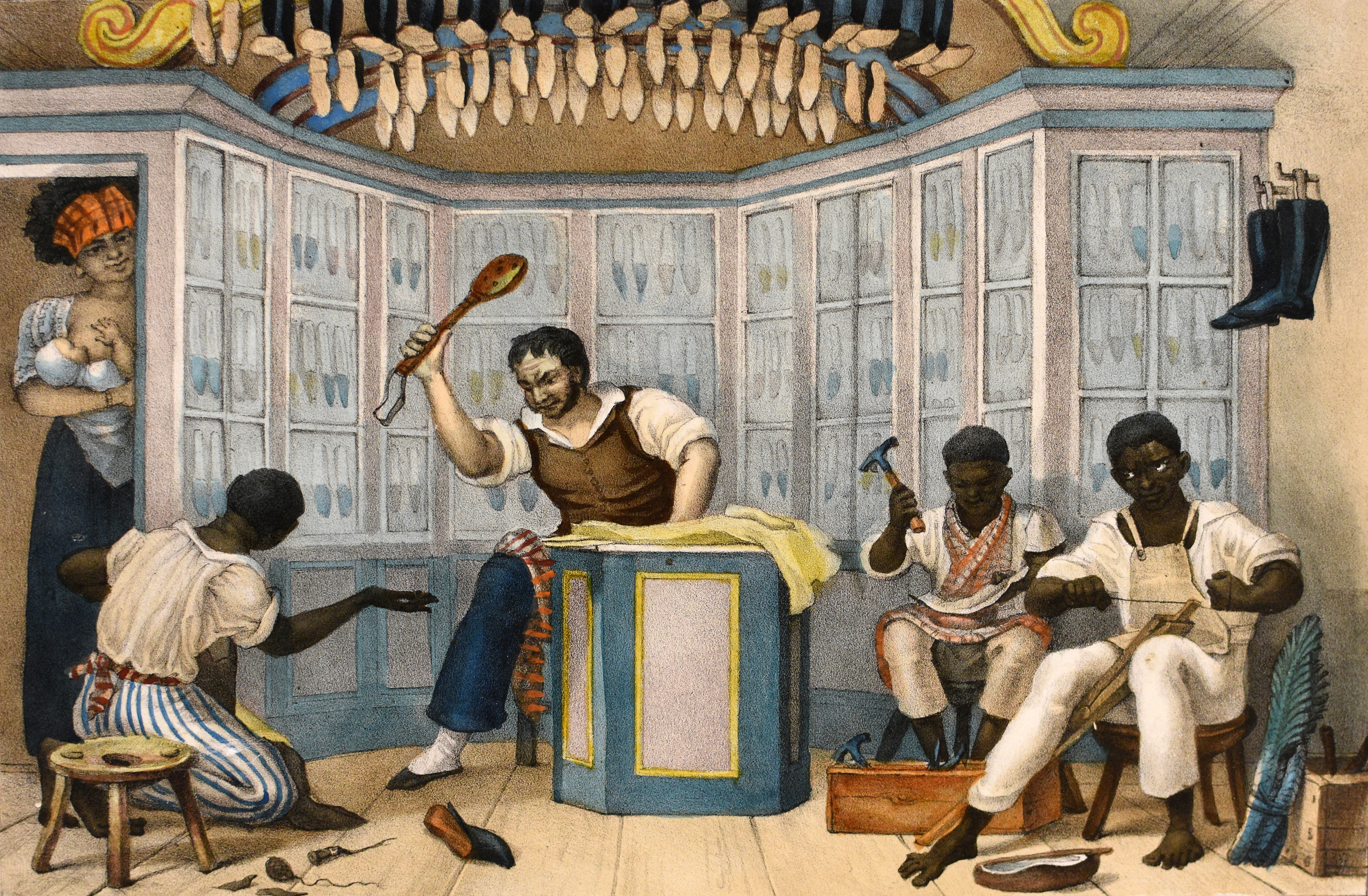
Punishment (Jean Baptiste Debret, "Shoemaker's Shop", Voyage Pittoresque et Historique au Brésil.) Incentivisation got better results, however.

Brazil abolished slavery in 1888; in the accompanying euphoria, many slave records were destroyed. It is only fairly recently that scholars have begun to recover the surviving documents. In the slave era, if an owner voluntarily liberated a slave there was a document to prove it, called a letter of manumission. Newly freed people took good care to file these in public registries, and they are now crucial historical sources. They have been investigated most for the state of Bahia, one of the major slaveholding regions of the Americas.

In Brazil it was "not rare" for slaves to own slaves as part of an informal peculium. Reis found 507 slave-owning slaves in early 19th century Salvador, the provincial capital, and suggested the real number was at least twice as high. However, the institution was not inherited from Roman law nor was it mentioned in Brazil's vague and anachronistic slave laws. It was a custom that had evolved independently, seemingly amongst the slaves themselves, though they considered it specially demeaning to be the slave of a slave.

CERTIFICATE.

"I solemnly baptise with the Holy Chrism Joaquim, a Nagô man, apparently 22 years old, slave of Benedicto, a Hausa man, himself a slave of Dona Ponciana Isabel de Freitas, white, widow, domiciled in Cais da Loiça; the godfather is Domingos Lopes de Oliveira, a Benguela man, ex-slave, single, domiciled in the parish of Santo Antonio Além do Campo. — 26 January 1817."

In this society investing in enslaved persons was the main road to prosperity and prestige, and negotiation—albeit between highly unequal beings—was a favoured strategy, more effective than beating, though that too was employed, quite often.

Slaves who owned sub-slaves used various tactics to achieve recognition for their property. One method was to have their sub-slaves baptised. It was a pious Catholic custom for white owners to take their slaves to church to be baptised, and when this was done the priest would issue a certificate. Slave-owning slaves did the same, relying on the certificate as informal proof of ownership.

How sub-slavery was enforced e.g. if a slave's slave refused to obey her, or tried to run away, research has not yet revealed.

==== City of Salvador ====
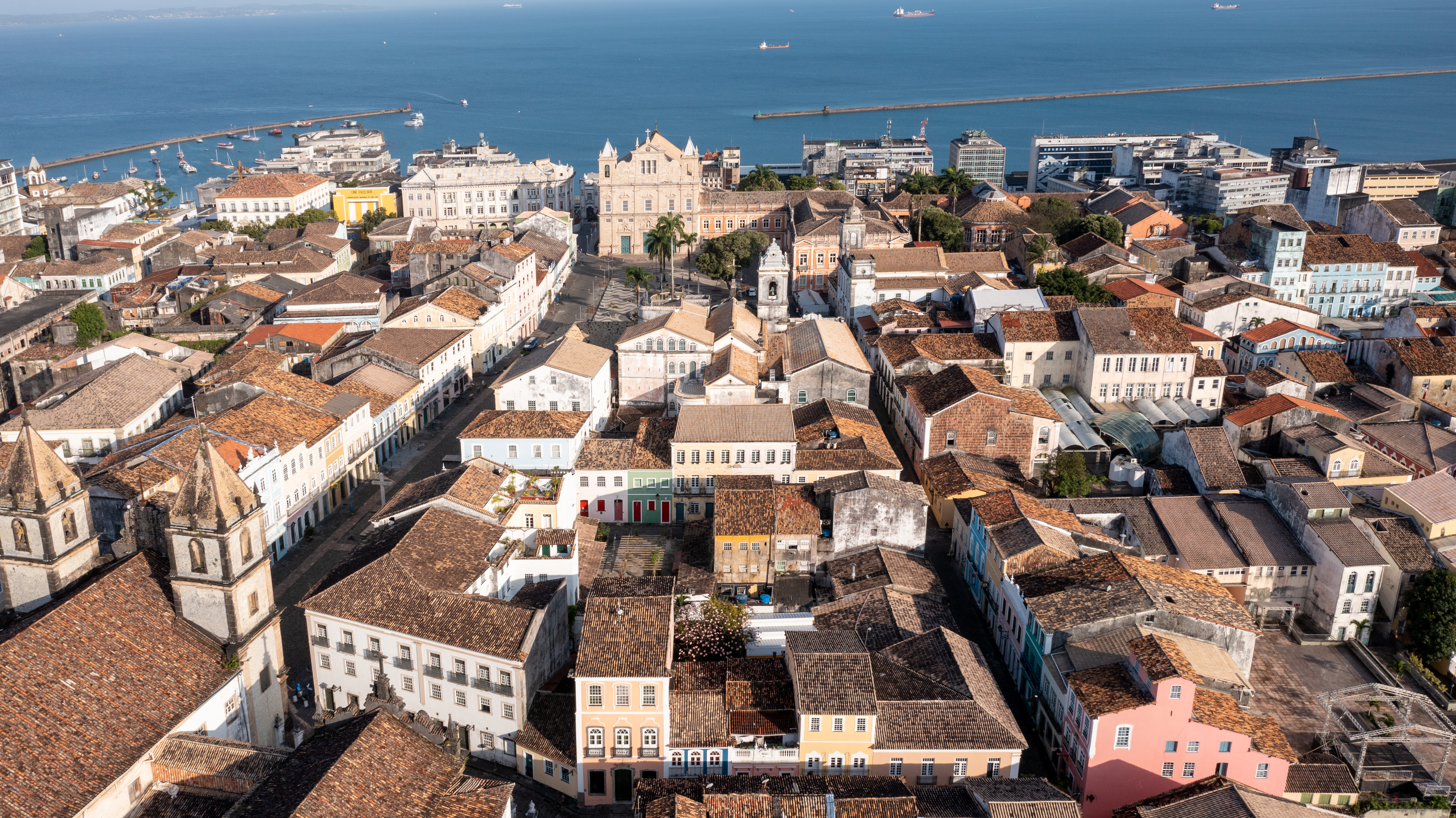
Colonial Salvador, hub of one of the world's major slaveholding regions

Nishida studied 3,516 letters of manumission registered at Salvador between 1808 and 1884. In this port city whites were in a minority, being perhaps 30% of the population. Of the slaves, although most had been born in Brazil, many had been born in Africa. The Africans were not a homogenous people; they associated according to their various African ethnicities. Thus each nação (nation, ethnic group) met at its favourite street corner, conversed in its own language and had a mutual aid association.

In Salvador, slaves were often exploited in the hiring out system:

Wage-earning slaves called escravos de ganho were hired out on either a full-time or part-time basis. They were obliged to return to their owners a mutually agreed portion of their daily or weekly wages. Some even lived outside their owners' houses. The most visible examples of escravos de ganho were peddlers of both sexes, male porters working in gangs, male artisans, and female market-stall keepers called quitandeiras. The city also permitted domestic slaves to hire themselves out as peddlers or prostitutes at night and on Sundays and holidays.

Slave entrepreneurs

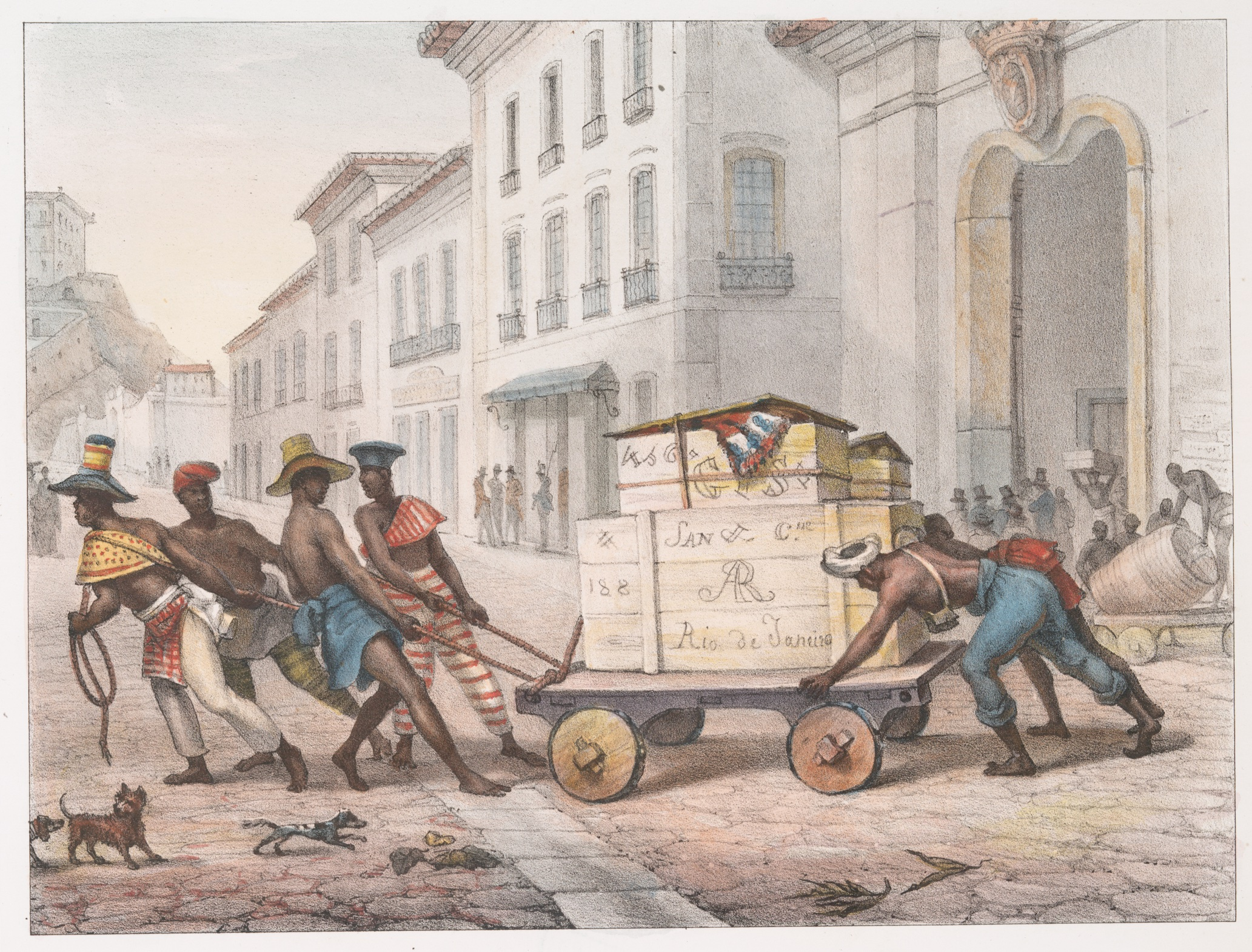
Gang of street porters for hire

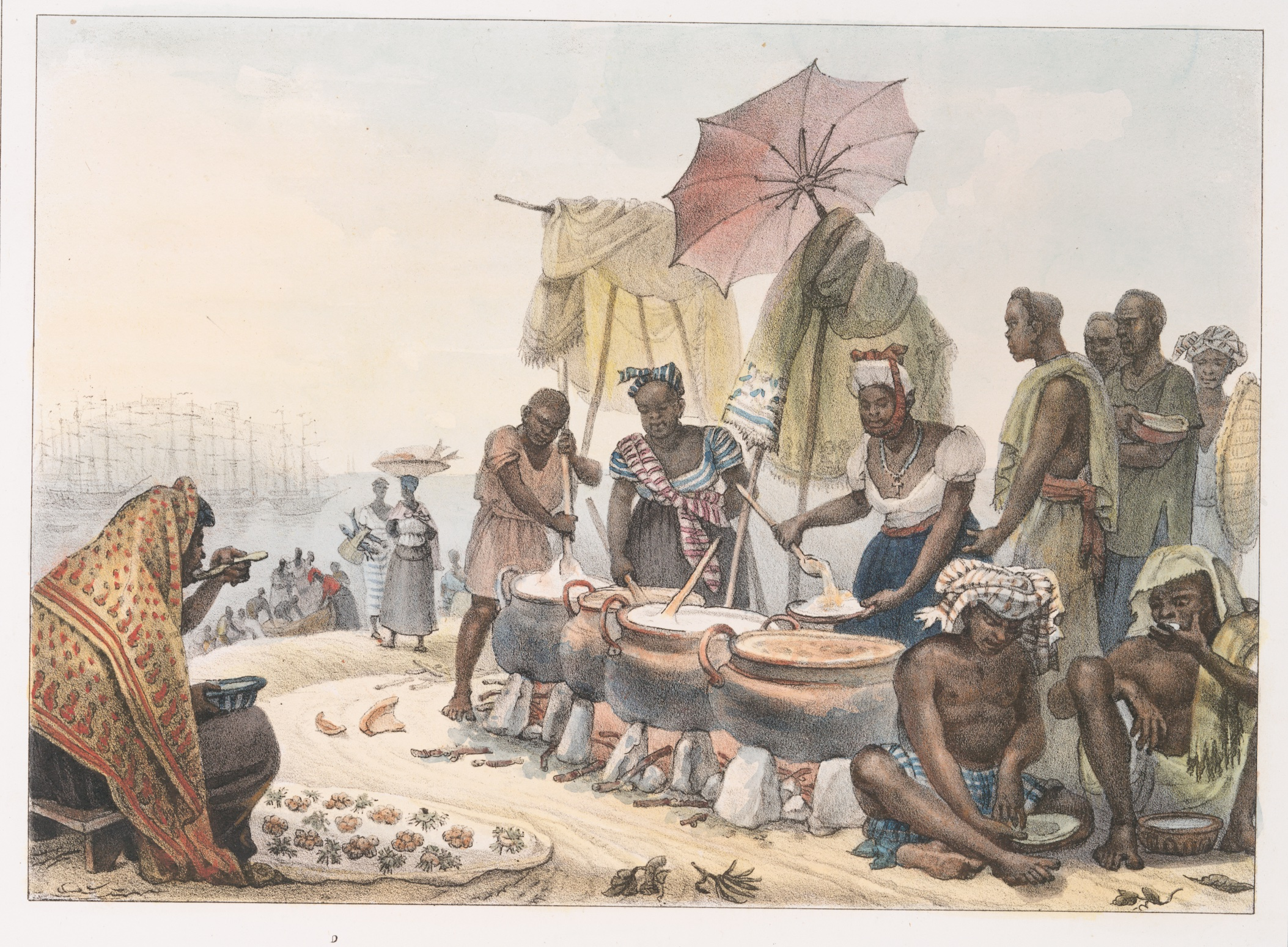
Women food vendors

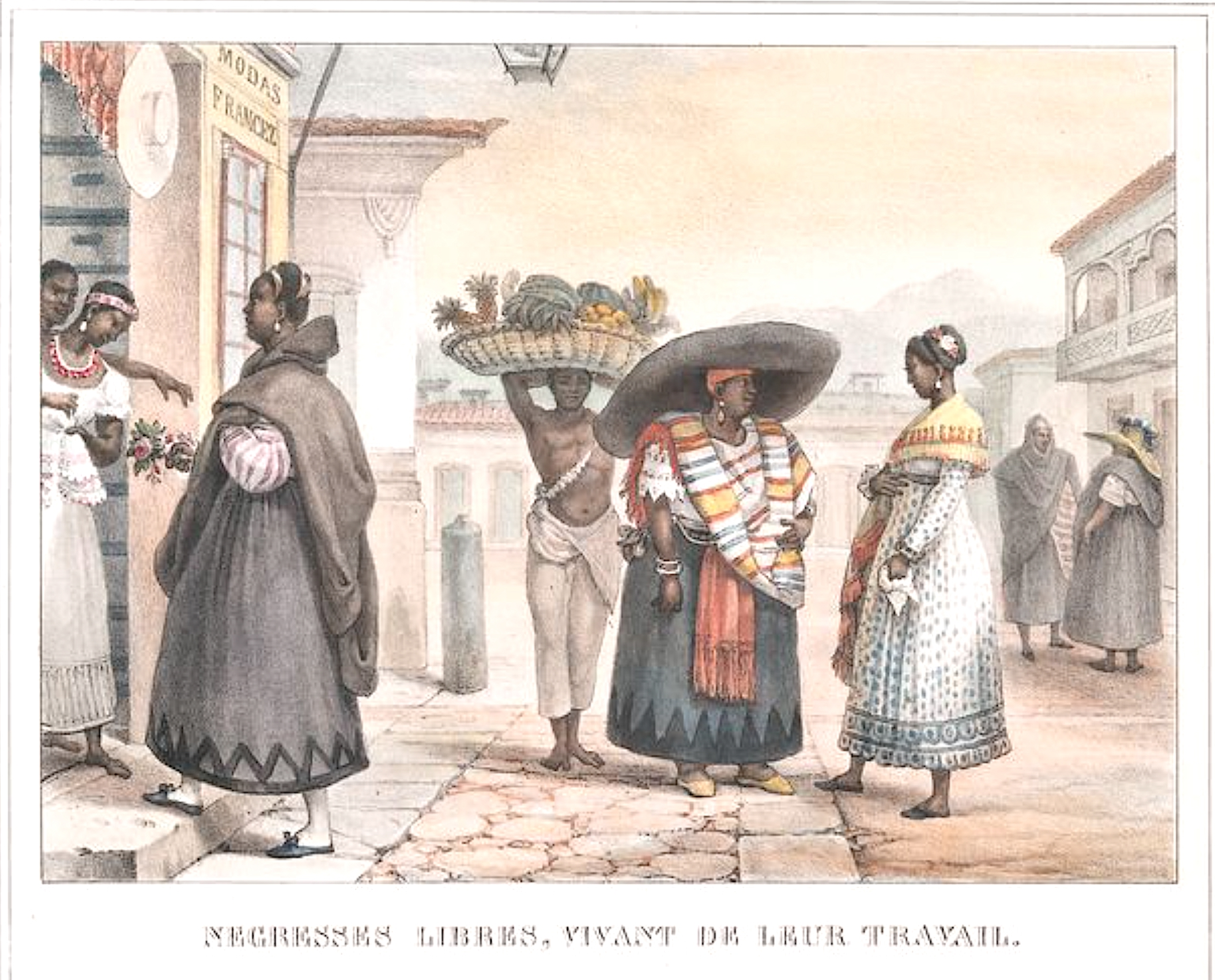
Aspiration

(Jean-Baptiste Debret, Voyage Pittoresque et Historique au Brésil: New York Public Library)

From their earnings enterprising slaves saved up to buy their freedom. Most paid cash, but Nishida found 35 cases of self-purchase through slave substitution. For example, Francisco, an African-born Nagô slave, paid for his freedom by substituting his slave Joǎo, another Nagô man.

It has been noticed that freedperson and substitute-slave in this era tended to belong to the same nação. The reason was that the cheapest slaves to buy were negros novos (newly arrived Africans), since they neither spoke Portuguese nor were acculturated to the slave society in any way; they had to be broken in. Slaves purchased sub-slaves from the same language group. "With the owner's consent, a slave purchased the substitute, acculturated and trained the newcomer in special occupational skills, and finally 'traded in' the substitute for the slave's own freedom".

Owners willingly accepted these trade-ins. In place of an ageing slave, they got a young one. One shopkeeper agreed to liberate his slave Gertrudes on condition that she found and trained a replacement, also to be called Gertrudes, as nearly as possible to the same standard. Similar bargains were made in ancient Rome.

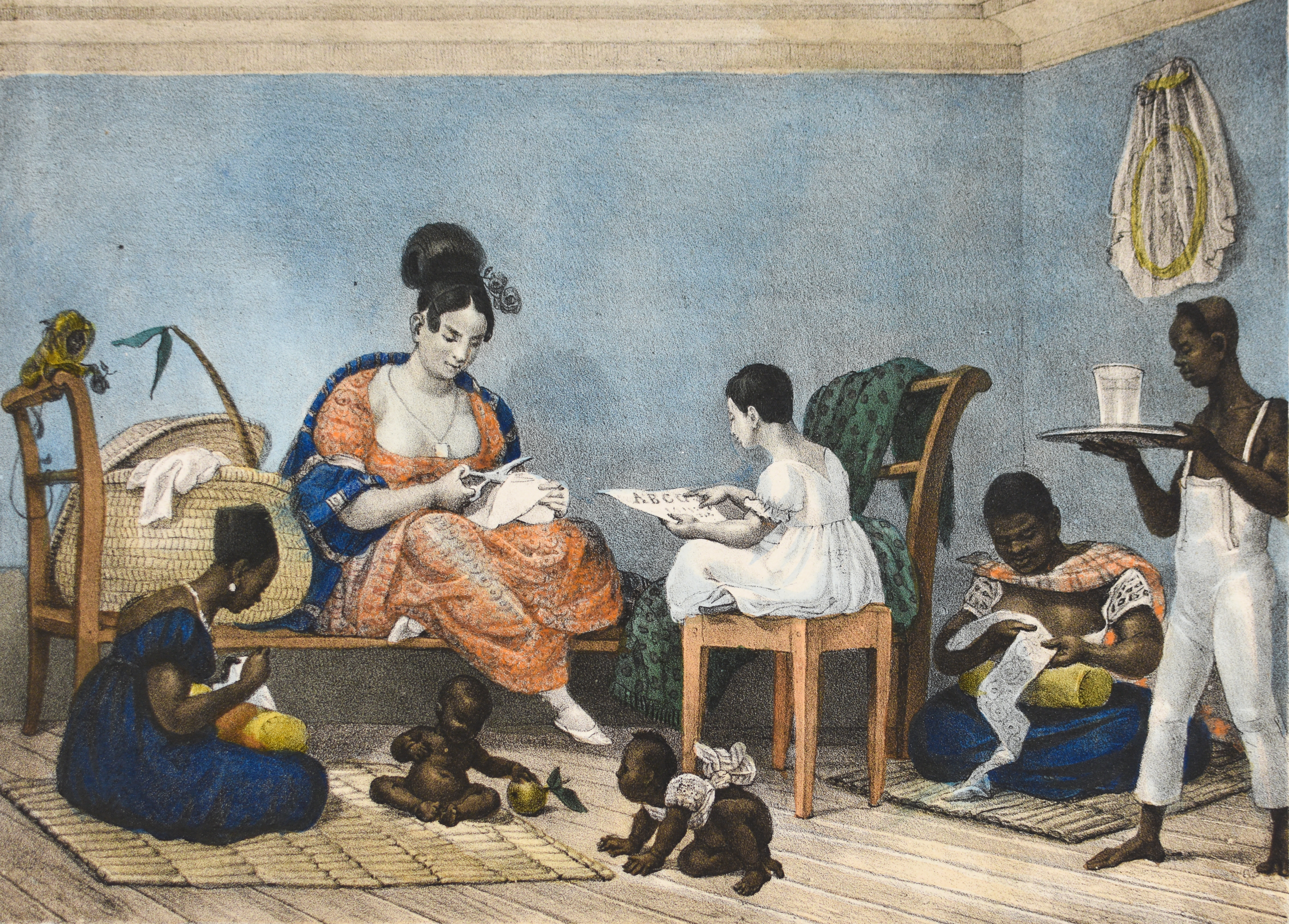
Domestic scene (Une Dame d´une Fortune Ordinaire, Jean-Baptiste Debret, c. 1823)

Reis suggested that some slaves may have been crewmen on Brazilian slaving-ships, hence were able to purchase Africans on favourable terms. Manumission by slave-substitution died out with the transatlantic slave-trade.

Stuart B. Schwartz studied 1,015 manumission letters for a much earlier period (1684–1745). He found that, of those set at liberty, nearly half had to pay for it. A significant proportion of these slaves paid not in cash but in substitute slaves. It struck him that females were far more likely to be manumitted than males, a finding echoed by other scholars ("Every recent study of manumission in Latin America has found that a sizeable majority of those freed were females".) Schwartz did not speculate why, but he noted that in 1735 a Brazilian council alleged that manumissions were paid for by prostitution and crime. Possibly, however, the occupations of female escravas do ganho better allowed them to handle money themselves, and save some.

Schwartz found a legal record that suggested that some slaves, in order to purchase sub-slaves cheaply, by-passed the regular system and imported direct from Africa.

A [Brazilian-born] slave, Lucianna Maria da Conceição, wished to purchase a slave as a dowry for her granddaughter. She gave money to a friend to be sent to Africa for this purpose, and a Nagô woman named Jeronima was purchased and delivered to her. The newly acquired slave was conducted to the [sugar mill] where Lucianna resided but was eventually sent to the city to be "hired out" (por ao ganho). Jeronima then sent her earnings to her mistress, who continued to labor as a slave on the plantation.

==== State of Pernambuco ====
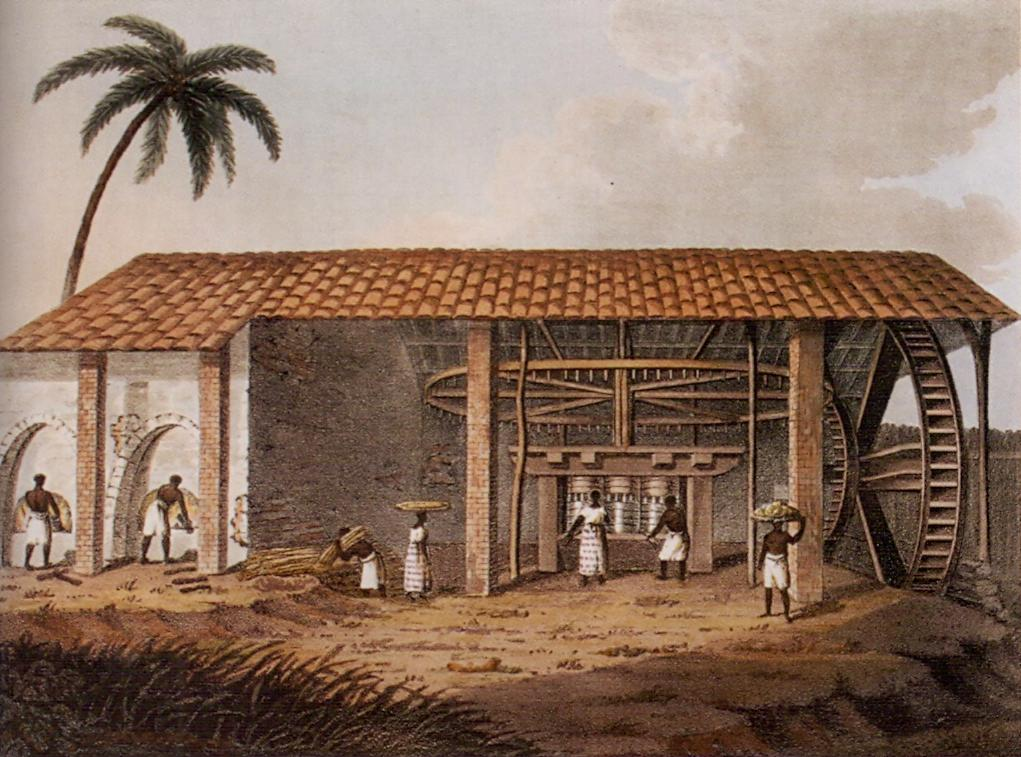
A Pernambuco sugar mill according to English traveller Henry Koster

The Benedictine Order owned several sugar plantations in Pernambuco with many slaves, but their numbers gradually fell and few monks were left to supervise them. The monks evolved a strategy of encouraging slaves to buy their freedom by offering to take “one slave for another” (a substitute), which may have contributed to the formation of a group of slave-owning slaves.

At the Jaguaribe plantation the overseer was one Nicolau de Souza. As was commonplace for generations, he was a slave himself. Rarely supervised by the absentee monks, he was in charge of perhaps a hundred labourers. In 1812 the English traveller Henry Koster lived nearby and he wrote about Nicolau, whose efficient administration he admired. According to Koster, Nicolau had a wife and children, slaves like himself, and he was able to buy their freedom. He was unable to buy his own freedom, however, despite offering "two Africans" in exchange, since the monks thought he was irreplaceable. Nicolau otherwise enjoyed a comfortable lifestyle, rode about like a rich planter, was allowed to remain seated in their presence, and owned at least nine slaves of his own. Few free Brazilian men owned that many. Koster made it quite clear that Nicolau longed to be a free man, however.

==== Minas Gerais ====
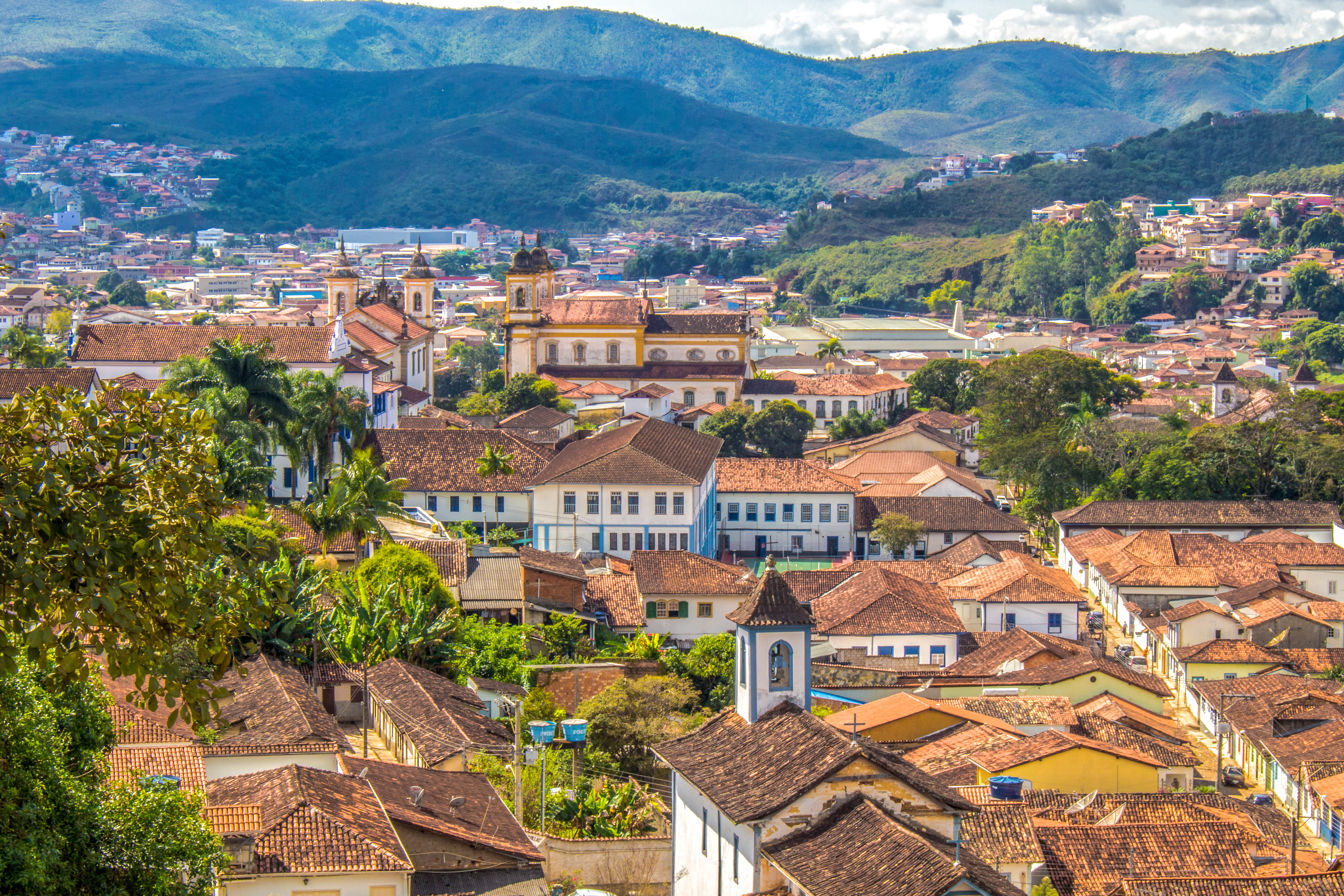
Mariana, Minas Gerais

Surviving tax and manumission records for Minas Gerais show that at least one slave woman acquired slaves as a long term capital investment—not just to pay for her own manumission. Thus, in a freedom bargain, one Dominga Pereira, a Mina woman, gave her owner two pounds of gold and a male slave; he allowed her to keep her four other slaves and take them away. How she acquired gold and five slaves is not clear. "Eighteenth-century primary sources created a certain mystique about Mina women, praising their physical beauty and crediting them with special powers over occult forces. At the same time, they were recognized as shrewd traders..."

One slave owned by Dominga was André do Couto Godinho (1720–1790). Although born the slave of a slave, and despite formal colour bars, he attended the most prestigious university in Portugal, was admitted to the priesthood, and was sent to a West African kingdom on religious and ambassadorial duties.

=== North America ===
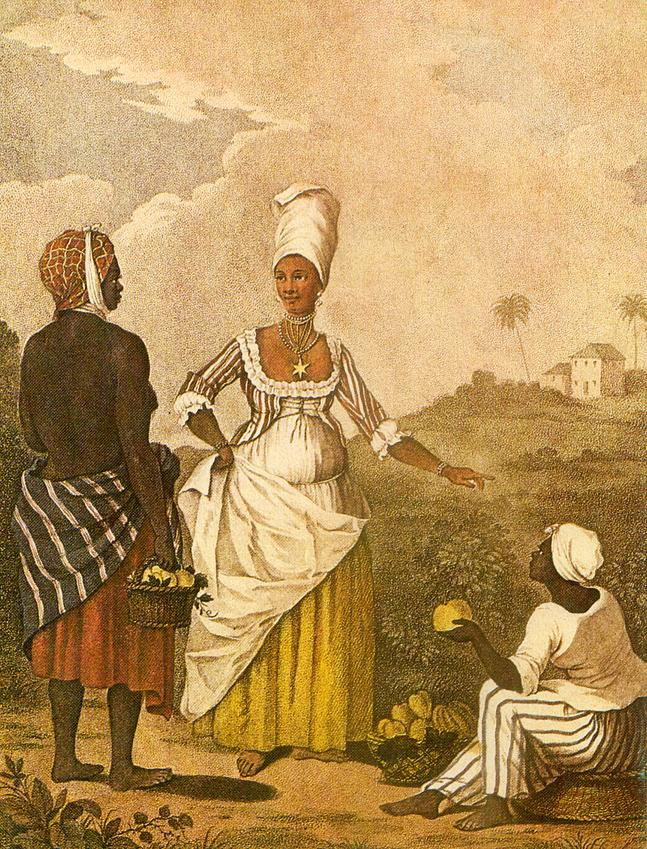
The Barbadoes Mulatto Girl, Agostino Brunias, Barbados Museum & Historical Society

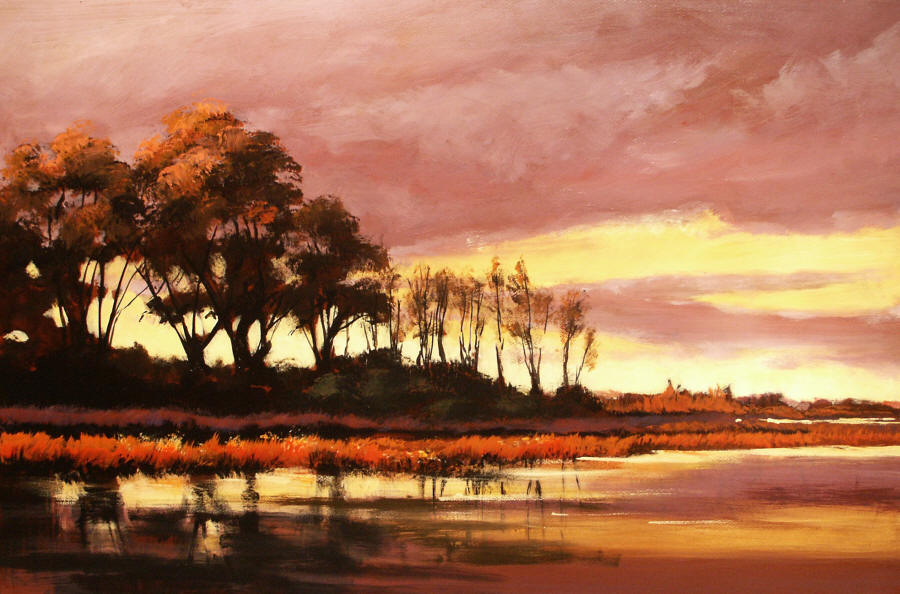
Low-country landscape (William Armstrong)

==== Elite plantation slaves ====
In eighteenth-century Barbados some plantations had elite slaves who enjoyed far better living standards than the mass of field labourers, including the right to accumulate property and the use of slaves for their own purposes. At Newton Plantation the family of Old Doll, "a retired housekeeper matriarch" were given preferential treatment for many years. Upwardly mobile, literate, disdaining menial tasks, if sent to work in the fields they stirred up trouble; otherwise, they co-operated in the smooth running of the estate. "Not only did Doll's family have access to slave attendants", wrote Barbadian historian Hilary Beckles, "they also 'possessed' their own slaves who waited on them". Mary Ann, a member of Doll's family, had a white companion who willed her a slave called Esther; in time Esther had five children, all of whom slaved for Doll's family. Effectively, Old Doll's family were slave-owning slaves.

==== The low country task system ====
Most plantations in the American South used the gang system, in which slaves were worked in groups from sunrise to sunset and had little leisure to acquire property. In the low country of South Carolina and Georgia, however, the task system prevailed. Slaves were compelled to perform certain specific tasks; but once completed, the rest of the day was theirs. Thus incentivised, slaves finished their tasks quickly, perhaps by early afternoon. They proceeded to farm fields of their own, which were customarily allowed them for the purpose. Hence slaves acquired livestock and other property. Philip D. Morgan reviewed the records of the Southern Claims Commission, from which it was apparent that by the outset of the Civil War field hands in some counties owned horses, cows, buggies, wagons, hogs, sheep and trading commodities; these they bought, sold, hired out, or bequeathed to kinfolks. Despite their servile status, their right to own those things was unquestioned in the slave society. However, few cases have been found of slaves owning slaves in the United States.

==== American slaves buying slaves ====
An exception is revealed by the lawsuit Guardian of Sally, a Negro v. Beaty (1792), Supreme Court of South Carolina. The defendant Beaty owned "a negro wench slave", not otherwise identified, whom he hired out for wages, part of which she was allowed to keep for herself. She gradually saved up "a considerable sum of money". Out of this fund she paid Beaty to purchase another of his female slaves, named Sally. (It may have been her own daughter.) She then let Sally go free. Beaty tried to repudiate the transaction, arguing that a slave could not acquire property—he cited Roman law, though not much—so Sally must be his slave still. The court, which obviously thought Beaty was behaving despicably, recognised the purchase and held Sally was free.

But for Beaty's unusual behaviour this instance (of a slave owning a slave) would have gone unrecorded. Another instance is Free Frank, a slave who had a saltpetre business in Kentucky; from the profits he purchased his wife and let her go free; two years later (1819) he purchased his own freedom. It is likely there were similar incidents, if only because "some African American slaveholders owned relatives and friends not to exploit them but because manumission either was too difficult to obtain or would not bring much benefit". Lightner and Ragan found that, while this was generally so, there were also African Americans who owned slaves in order to exploit them for their labour.

=== West Africa ===
==== Hausaland ====
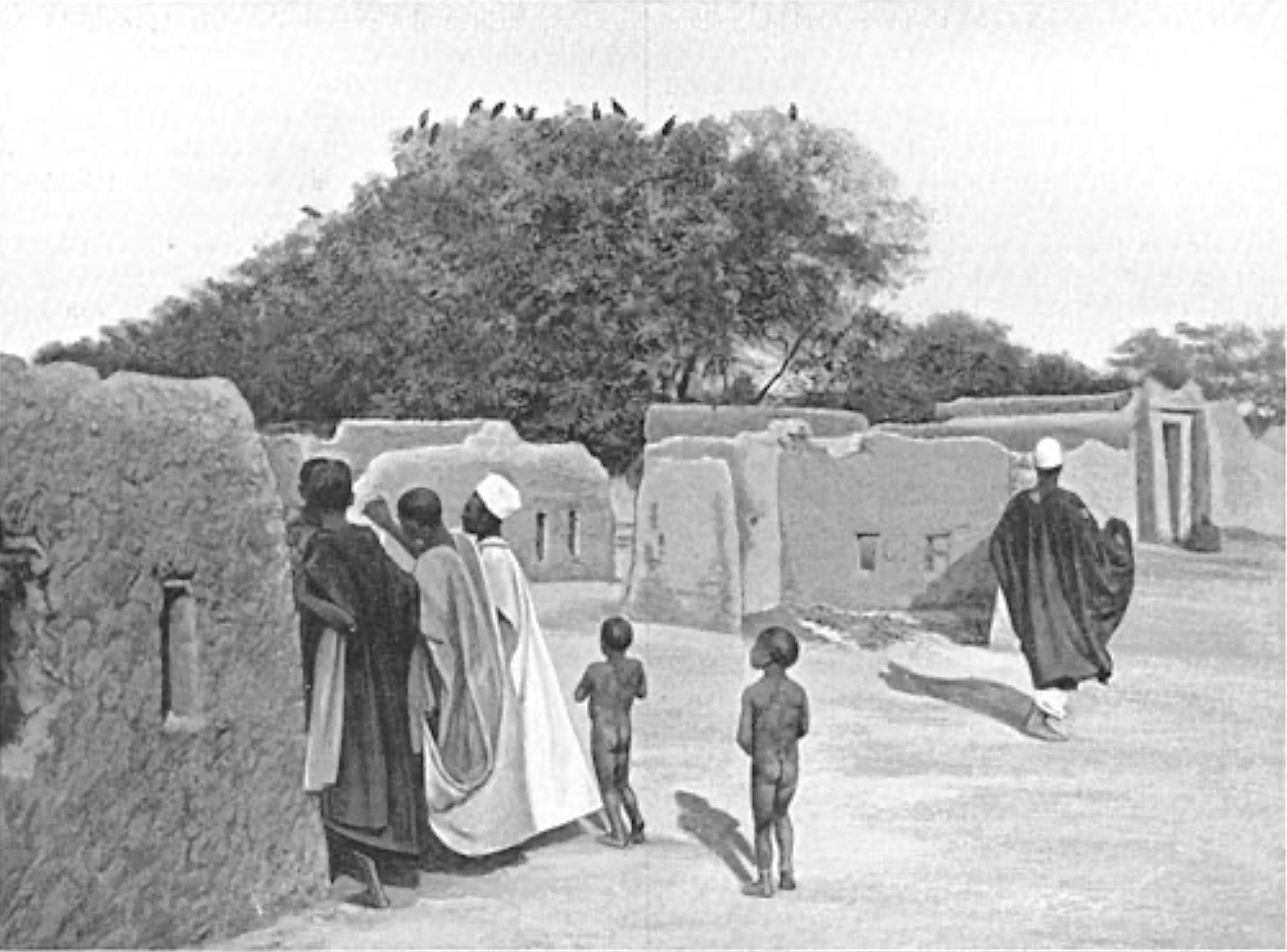
Hausaland, c.1906

The anthropologist Polly Hill found that a kind of farm-slavery flourished among the people of Hausaland, north Nigeria; her characterisation resembles peculium slavery as described in this article. Slaves were acquired by capture, inheritance or purchase in the market, though they did have certain customary rights. They laboured for their masters on farms, but "during a 'long morning' only". The rest of the day was theirs, during which they could cultivate plots of land for themselves. It saved their owners the expense of feeding them. However, in their own time some of these slaves accumulated wealth, and even purchased slaves of their own.

In 1903 the new British colonial authorities declared slavery null and void, but their proclamation was ignored. In 1906 it was reported that "many farm slaves became rich and owned many slaves of their own". Slavery persisted for another two decades before it was eradicated.

==== Igboland ====
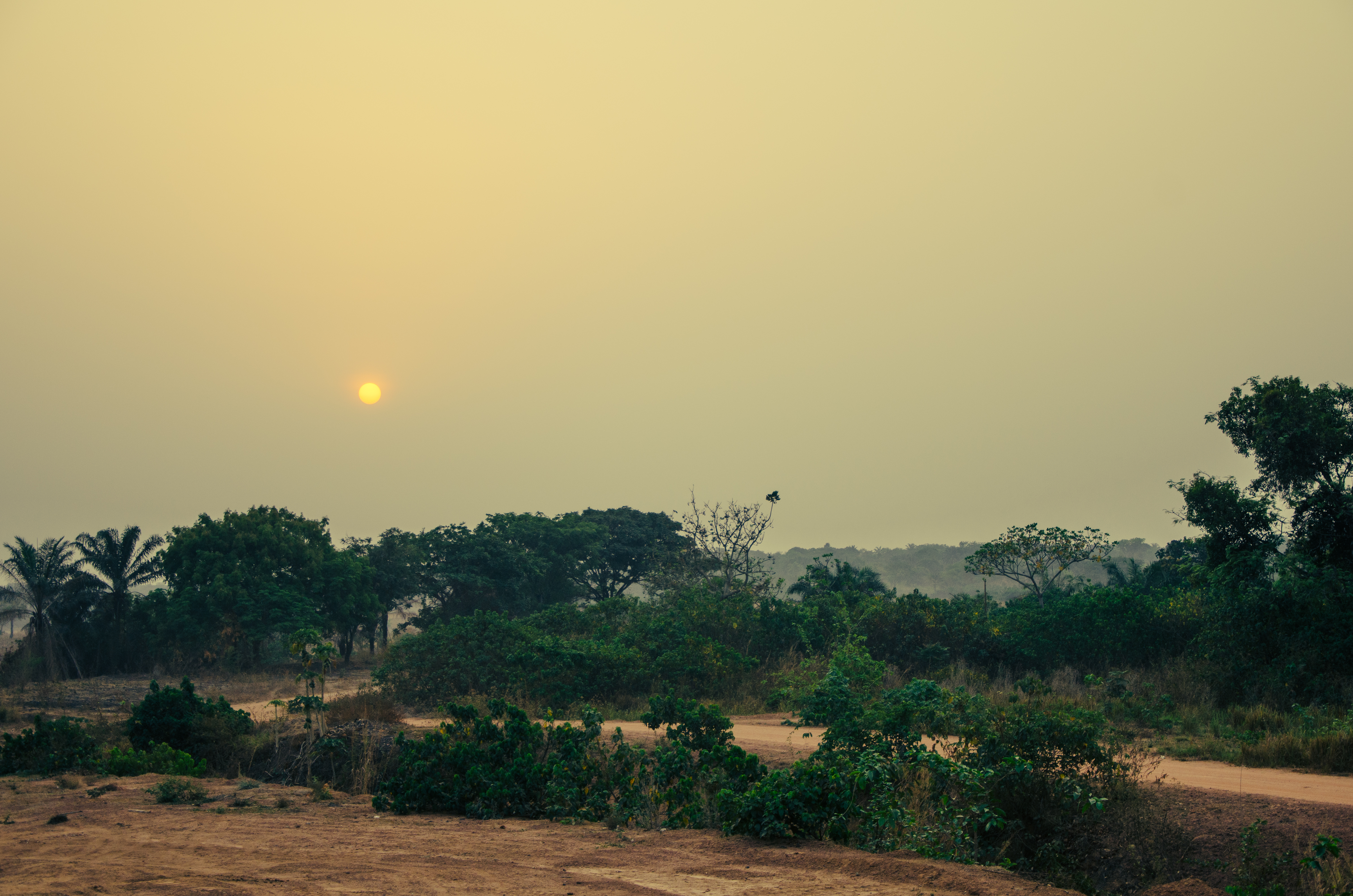
Nkanu West, Enugu, today

Rutgers historian Carolyn A. Brown found that traditional slavery among the Nkanu people, Igboland, southeastern Nigeria, was rigid and oppressive. Domestic slaves were liable to be sold to slave traders or even sacrificed in funeral rites; they were hardly ever manumitted. Nevertheless, some slaves managed to acquire property and "displayed wealth in culturally recognized ways: they bought other slaves, who served as their surrogates while they traveled, and they married many wives". In the 1920s it dawned on the enslaved classes that slavery was illegal under British colonial rule, and they started to rebel. The first to do so were the wealthier, slave-owning slaves since "these men had almost eliminated the restrictions between themselves and the freeborn" yet were being denied participation in social rites, the status symbols of the truly free. During 1922-1929 there were violent conflicts between slaves and owners, forcing the authorities to intervene.

==== Bundu ====
ORAL HISTORY.

"At that time, there were many slaves. Everyone had slaves. The Fulbe had slaves, smiths had slaves. Even slaves had slaves, really, it is true. Slaves of Fulbe lived in the same compound with the Fulbe. Slaves of smiths lived in the same compound with the smiths. Slaves lived in the same compound with the slaves (who owned them)... Everyone knew who was a slave of a free-born person, who was a slave of a smith, who was a slave of a slave."

In Bundu, Senegambia there was a class of slave-owning slaves. Though the French colonial authorities were supposed to stop slavery (and told Paris they had succeeded), the practice was persistent, and survived long enough to be recalled by old people interviewed as recently as 1991 (see quotebox).

Scholar Andrew F. Clark found that

A strong moral code, which reflects the dominant, free-born Fulbe ideology, underpins the narratives... Slaves are frequently portrayed as 'knowing their place', or faithfully serving their masters. Some traditions deal with the bravery, hard work or good deeds of slaves; others relate stories of undisciplined, clever or runaway slaves.

Because of the recency of slavery, in some West African countries it is illegal to refer to a person's servile origins.

=== Yunnan, China ===
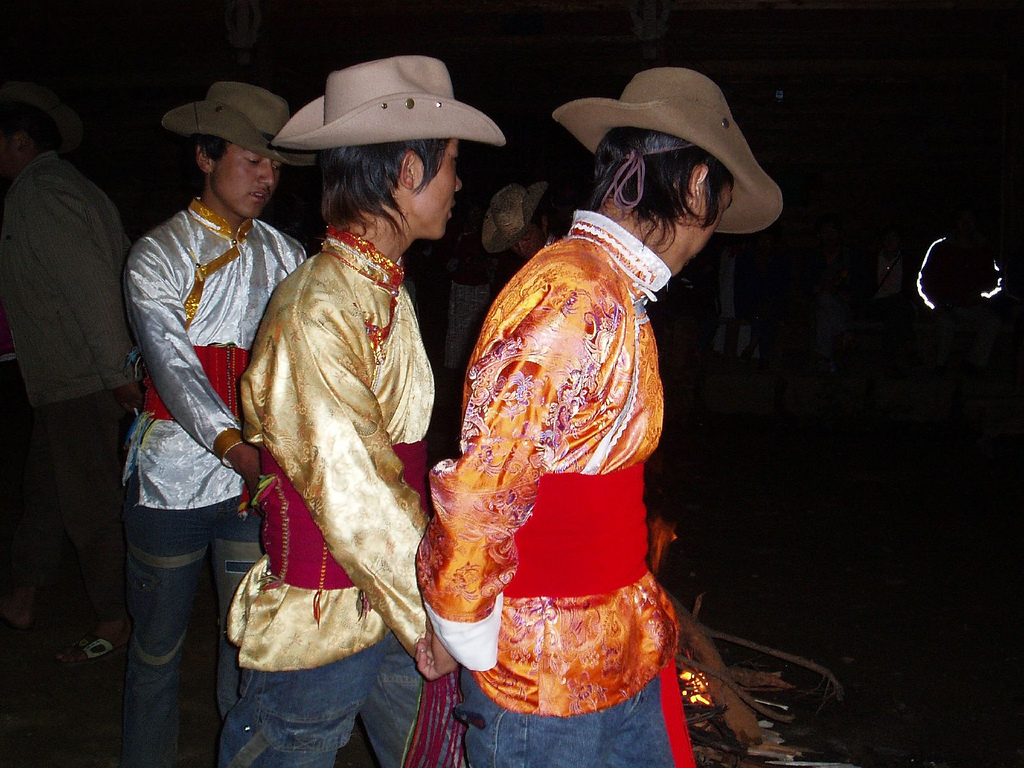
Mosuo youths in traditional dress

Amongst the ethnic minority Yi people of Yunnan, southwest China there existed a form of slavery in which there were slave-owning slaves. In 1957 the author Alan Winnington visited a mountainous area where, despite the Chinese Communist Revolution, the government had not yet succeeded in eradicating the practice. These people, whom Winnington knew as the Norsu (Mosuo) existed in four castes: nobles, commoners, "separate-slaves" and house-slaves.

According to Winnington, the separate-slaves were assigned wattle huts and sexual mates, being bred like cattle. Their children were taken from them, becoming the noble's house-slaves, the lowest status of humanity in the region and "maybe anywhere in the world", since they were treated abominably. As they grew up they were inherited by the nobles' sons and daughters, who in due course sent them to breed as separate-slaves; so the cycle repeated.

The separate-slaves were made to cultivate land but were allowed some spare time to do so for their own benefit. From the proceeds, including opium-growing, some were able to save up and buy slaves of their own, and perhaps their freedom. "Slaves possess slaves, and even the slaves of slaves possess slaves". The nobles, who called themselves the "Black-bone Yi" ('black-bone' denoted aristocracy) had strict marriage laws meant to ensure racial 'purity' for themselves, and were a warlike people whose tradition was to go on slaving raids in which they captured members of the Han (Chinese majority ethnic group). The slaves they owned were thus mainly of Han descent. Even today, when (according to a Czech researcher) everybody in the region is "equally poor", descendants of the slaves are "sneered at" by those claiming aristocratic ancestry.

=== Malay peoples ===
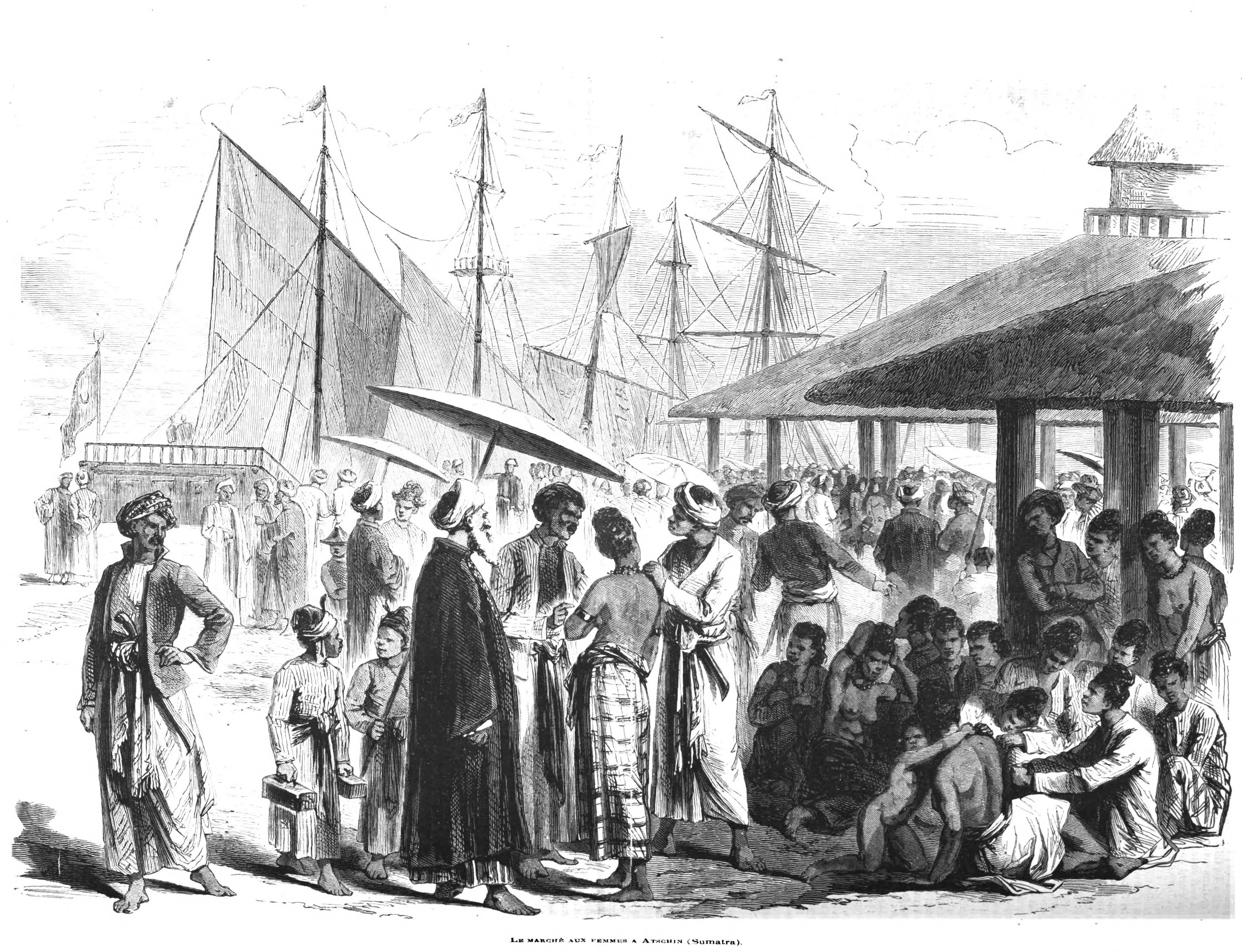
Slave market in Aceh, Sumatra, 1873

The explorer and naturalist William Dampier, who in 1688 visited Aceh, Sumatra, recorded that a local nobleman was reputed to own more than 1,000 slaves, some of whom were traders who owned slaves of their own, and so on. In his own words:

Some of these [slaves] were topping [prominent] merchants, and had many Slaves under them. And even these, tho' they are Slaves to Slaves, yet have their Slaves also; neither can a stranger easily know who is a Slave and who is not among them; for they are all, in a manner, Slaves to one another; and all in general to the Queen and Oronkeyes [orang kaya, noble], for their Government is very Arbitrary. Yet there is nothing of rigour used by the Master to his Slave, except it be the very meanest, such as do all sorts of servile work: but those who can turn their hands to any thing besides drudgery, live well enough by their industry. Nay, they are often encouraged by their Masters, who often lend them Money to begin some trade or business

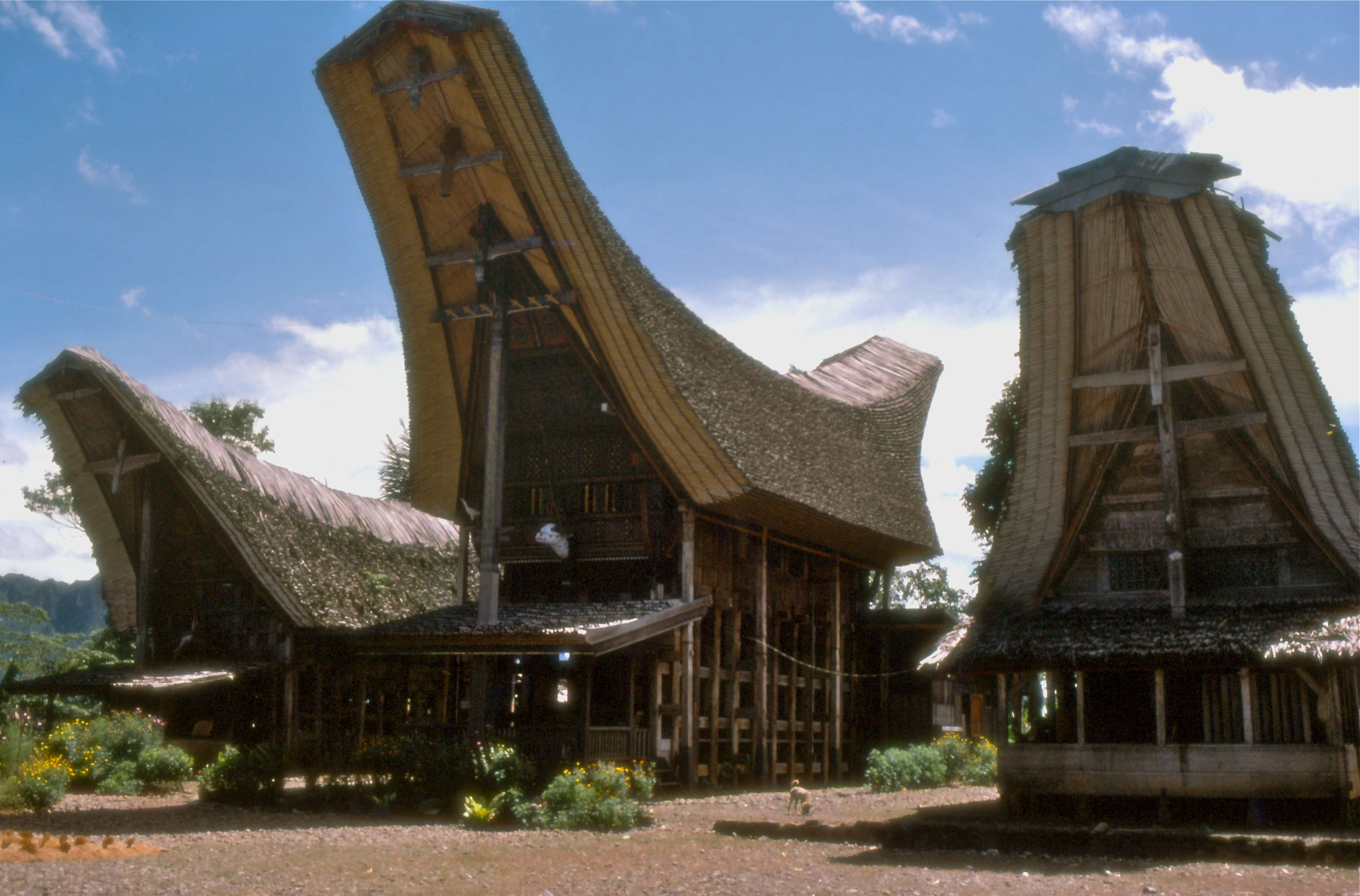
Toraja domestic architecture

taking a cut of the profits. Even the money-changers in the streets, who were women, were slaves. The head slaves, despite their comfortable lifestyles, were the property of their masters, who upon their death inherited their assets, including their children, unless they had had the foresight to purchase their freedom.

Anthropologist Roxana Waterson found that among the Torajan people of Indonesia there were slaves who owned slaves; the latter were called kaunan tai manuk (chicken-shit slaves).

According to A Descriptive Dictionary of British Malaya (1894), "In Malay there are six different names for a slave, and there is even one for the 'slave of a slave'". This is supported by other sources. It has been said that slaves enjoyed a far greater degree of social equality with their masters than was the case in the West. The British colonial officer Sir William Maxwell, who was supposed to suppress slavery, reported to Parliament that slavery in Malaya was an ancient local custom, established long before the introduction of Islam, and frequently conducted in breach of its precepts. For example, there was a form of debt-bondage, almost impossible to escape thanks to extortionate compound interest, "wholly opposed to Muhammadan law, which is most lenient to debtors". It was sometimes cruel. Maxwell transcribed from Arabic and Malay a Perak law which ordained that a slave who assaulted a free man should have his hands nailed down while his wife could be violated.

== Belonging to politically powerful slaves ==
=== Slave officials of the Roman Empire ===
First-century Rome was confronted with a novel problem: how to administer a large, newly acquired empire. The solution was to fill government posts with the emperor's own slaves and freedmen. Called the Familia Caesaris, we know many of them by name, since they were commemorated in inscriptions which are found all over the empire.

Slaves were appointed to these posts for two reasons. First, "no [free] Roman of standing would have demeaned himself by becoming the Emperor's personal servant". Secondly, slaves had the advantage that, if suspected of corruption, they could be examined under torture. Indeed, the emperor Augustus degraded some rascally senior officials and had them tortured to death.

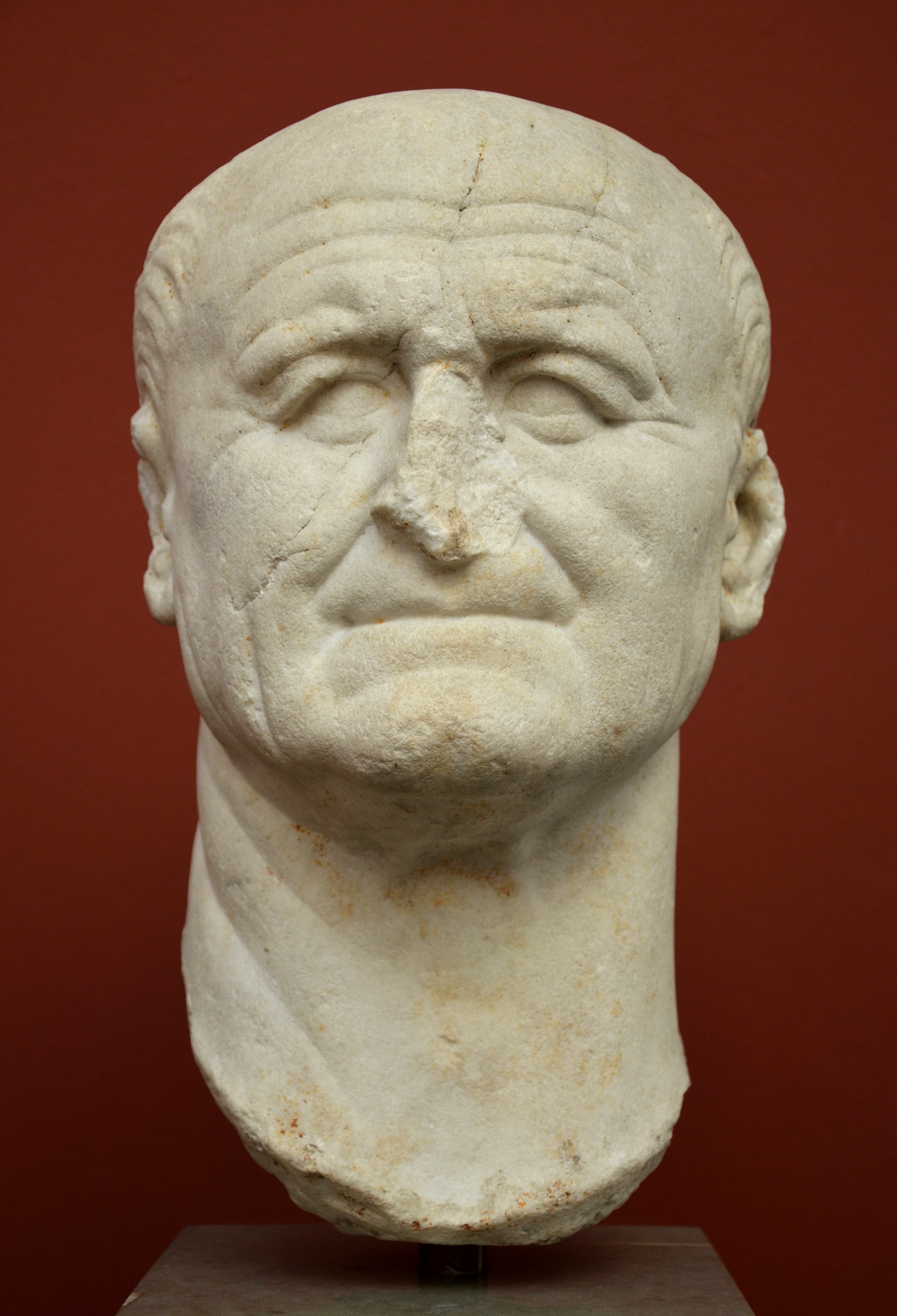
The emperor Vespasian promoted extortionate slaves on purpose.

Important imperial slaves had slaves of their own. A few were just private property—"for the easing of their personal lot". The most spectacular case was the imperial slave Musicus Scurranus, a provincial administrator, who on his last journey to Rome was attended by a retinue of sixteen personal sub-slaves including cooks, butlers, footmen, secretaries, and 'Secunda' (function unspecified).

But we know from the surviving inscriptions that most slaves of imperial slaves were official appointments. A head slave (ordinarius) belonged to the Emperor himself, and was given a deputy—a slave of his own—called a vicarius; both of these handled public monies. These government servi vicarii should not be confused with the low-status individuals of the same name, already considered in this article, who were just part of a richer slave's peculium. Government servi vicarii, despite being slaves of slaves, were quite prestigious. Free women were willing to "marry" them. Most handled public monies in the provinces. Vegetus, the purchaser of the slave girl Fortunata in Roman London (above) was an imperial vicarius.

Torture or not, some slave administrators were bold enough to extort money from the populace.

According to Suetonius, Vespasian, a strong emperor, deliberately appointed his most rapacious freedmen to proconsulships in the provinces with the expectation that they would amass as great a fortune as possible — fortunes that he would later appropriate by the simple expedient of execution.

How Musicus Scurranus could afford sixteen sub-slaves on his official salary was not explained; and there were other notorious cases. Most administrators could look forward to manumission after serving a number of years. A few retired with truly colossal fortunes.

=== Islamic world: the Mamluk concept ===
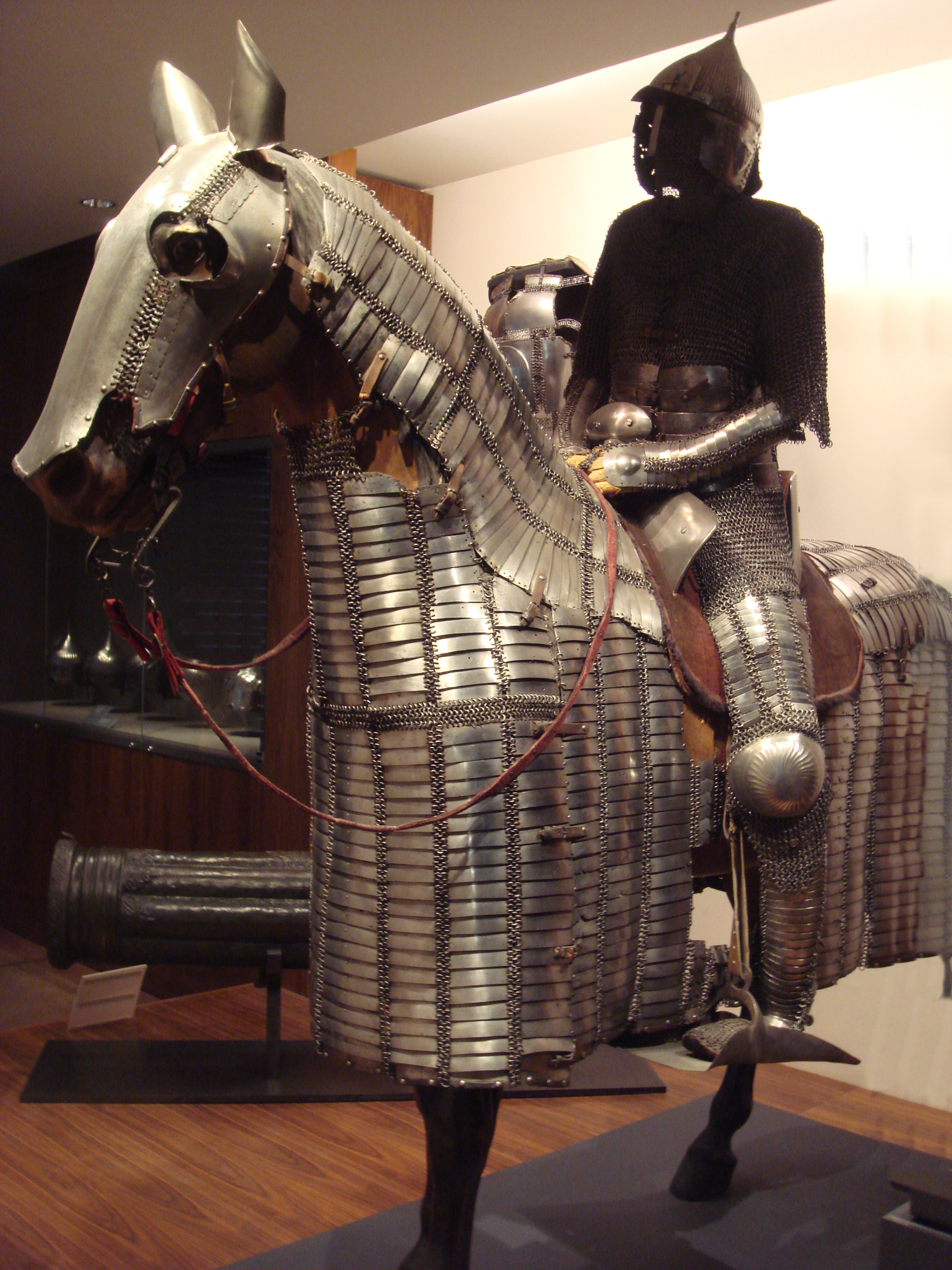
Mamluk cavalryman, Ottoman Empire, c. 1550

Richard Francis Burton, who travelled to Mecca disguised as a pilgrim on the Hajj (1853), wrote that the official in charge of his caravan had been the slave of a slave, and "he is but a solitary instance of cases perpetually occurring in all Moslem lands", where a slave might arrive at the highest rank in the empire.

It was quite common in the Islamic world because of an institution, strange-seeming to Western eyes, called the Mamluk system. While it varied appreciably from country to country (and through time) it was outlined by Berkeley historian Ira M. Lapidus as follows:

The Mamluk or slave military system is one of the most exotic phenomena in Muslim political history. Slaves were first systematically employed in ninth-century Baghdad to make up the armies of the Abbasid Caliphate, and from there the system spread to all of the Abbasid succession states in the Middle East and to North Africa, Spain, Iran, India, and the Ottoman Empire. Slave soldiers constituted the military and administrative aristocracy of most post-Abbasid Middle Eastern societies; in some cases, such as in the Ghaznavid dynasty of Afghanistan and the Mamluk regime in Egypt, the head of state was himself a slave.

The military and bureaucracy were continually recruited from slaves of foreign ethnicity, who depended utterly on the ruler; so they felt loyal to him alone; and he trusted them accordingly. There was no hereditary nobility to which caliphs and sultans owed favours, or which might challenge their rule. It was a "surrogate aristocracy", selected on merit; in principle unable to perpetrate itself. Orlando Patterson called these men the 'ultimate slaves' for, despite the power they wielded, they were natally alienated and dishonoured people; personal assets of the imperial masters they served, and who had no legal personality of their own. In one way or another the system lasted a thousand years.

"One Obedient slave is better
than three hundred sons
for the latter desire their father's death,
the former his master's glory".

Nizam al-Mulk, Book of Politics.

Carl F. Petry said these royal slaves:

owed their status and power entirely to the ruler or dominant oligarchy responsible for their purchase. Highly impressionable adolescents, selected for their quick wit and physical prowess, would be trained not only to excel in the martial arts but also to bestow their undivided loyalty upon their benefactors. By such a strategy the rulers sought to secure their control over populations whose allegiance was often doubtful.

The brightest were made government administrators. Talented women slaves might also rise to positions of power and influence, albeit by a seemingly very different route (see below).

The archetype of the youth who is enslaved in a distant land where by his intelligence he rises to wield immense power was the biblical Joseph, who also features in the Quran; and the parallel was understood in Mamluk Egypt by the elite slaves themselves, as well as by European visitors.

Since elite slaves would have subordinates, they might be expected to have slaves of their own. In the following instances the sources mention that they had.

==== Ottoman Empire ====
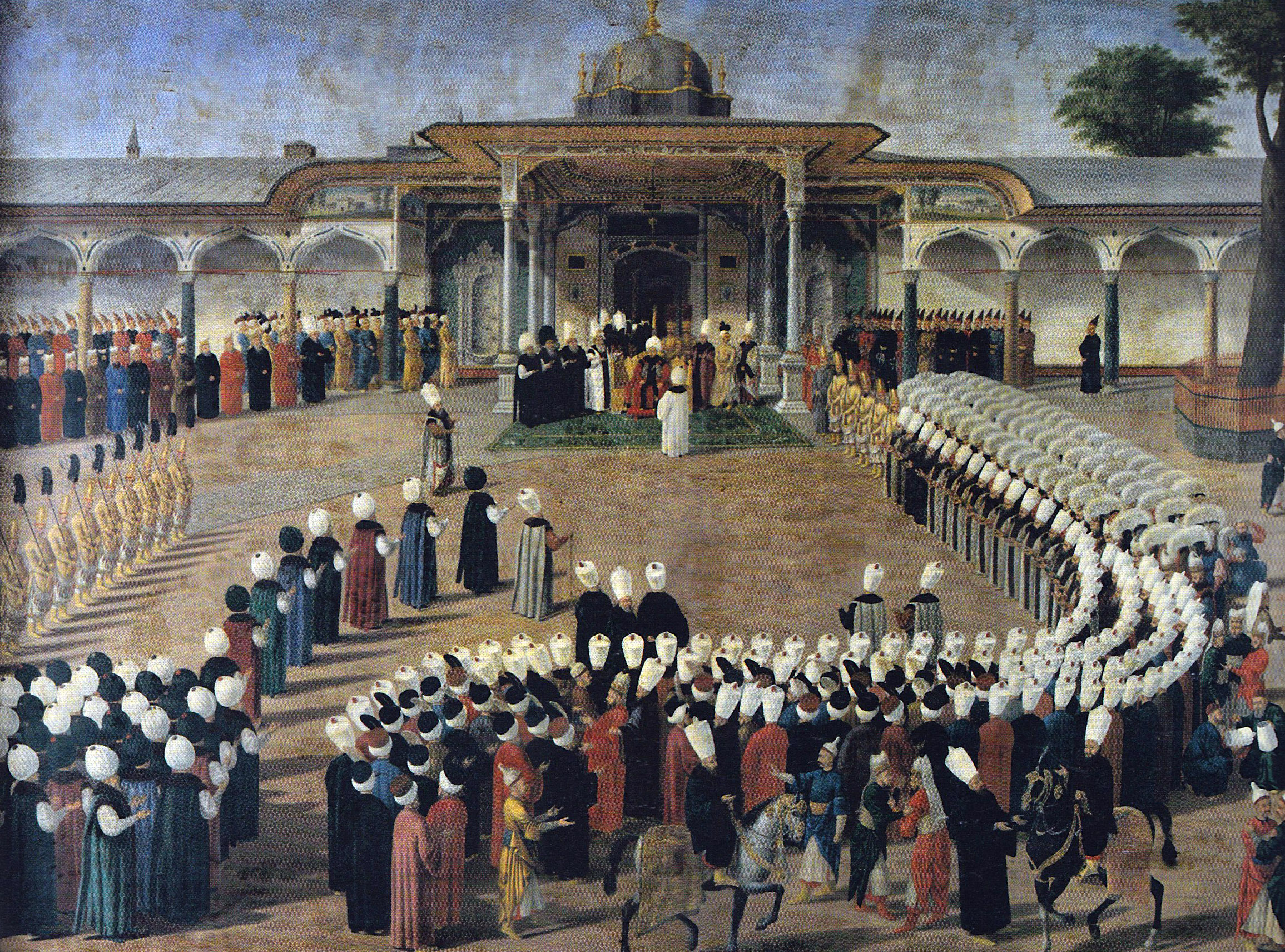
Audience at Topkapı Palace (Konstantin Kapıdağlı, oil on canvas)

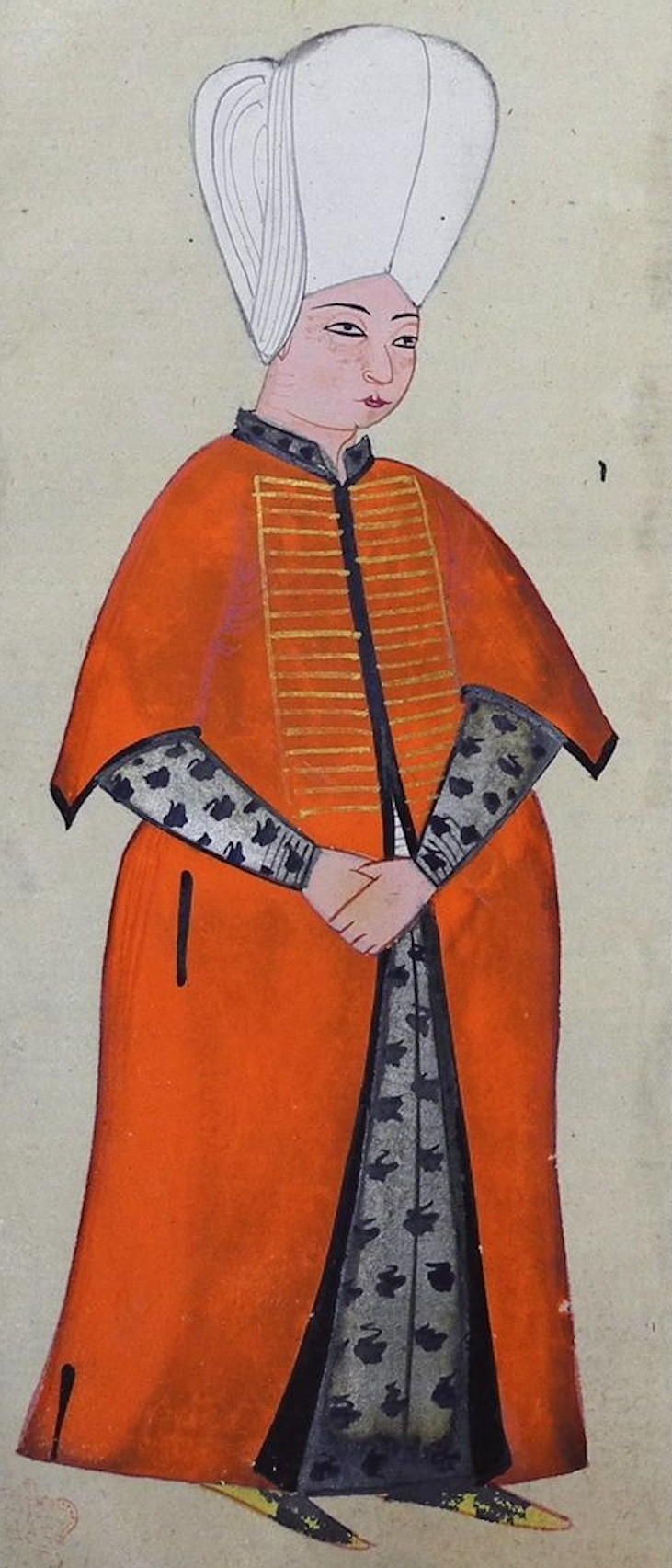
Chief White Eunuch, Ottoman Empire c. 1600, slave and slaveowner (British Museum)

In the Ottoman Empire, slaves (called kul in Turkish) were collected as boys. Unlike other Muslim lands, they were recruited from the Sultan's own subjects, apparently in defiance of religious law. The practice was known as devshirme. Taken at age 10-15 from Christian villages by recruitment squads, they were marched to the capital; the choicest were sent to Topkapi Palace. "Along the way they became Muslims and were given new Muslim names. They all shared the common patronymic Abdullah, literally servant of God". Although some volunteered—they saw career opportunities—most were compelled, only a few managing to flee.

After a few years of education and training under the aegis of the highest ranking palace official, the Chief White Eunuch, they were assigned to various tasks depending on their ability. Most joined the elite cavalry regiments; others became craftsmen or scholars. It is possible some volunteered for castration since it increased the opportunity to rise to the highest possible rank, grand vezir. After some years of provincial service, a very select few returned to the palace and achieved high administrative positions. "[I]n the sixteenth century almost all the pashas and the vezirs of the Imperial Council were of kul origin and had been trained at the palace".

Metin Kunt found records showing that some high palace slaves owned slaves of their own: he called them Kulların Kulları (Slaves of Slaves). Thus Cafer Agha, Chief White Eunuch, who died mid-16th century, owned, amongst other property, slaves who lived in the palace. Upon his death they were inherited by the Sultan himself.

Lewis A. Coser wrote that under Suleiman the Magnificent (1520–1566),

the Ottoman state rested largely on a military and civilian staff of renegade Christians. The standing army of foot soldiers, the Janissaries; the regular mounted regiments of the household, the Sipahis of the Porte; as well as the personnel of the sultan's court, his key advisors and administrative aides, had all the status of Kul, slaves of the sultan... Between 1453 and 1623 only five of the forty-seven grand viziers were of Turkish origin. The Ottoman system took boys from the cattle-run and the plow and made them courtiers, administrators and army officers...

Some scholars have doubted that persons of such high standing could really have been slaves, and have argued the youths were manumitted upon graduation. Though true in some places it was not so in others. Historian Victor Louis Ménage found a number of records incompatible with that theory. In the Ottoman Empire, after graduation, they remained slaves, though they were allowed to marry and own slaves themselves. By a doctrine of Islamic law called idhn a master could authorise his slave to marry and possess property, slaves included. The celebrated janissaries were prestigious slaves who were rarely manumitted; their chief had a palace of his own. There is an anecdote that the famous Grand Vizier Ibrahim Pasha was not allowed to testify in an Islamic court because, being a slave, his evidence was inadmissible; to soothe his wounded pride, the sultan promptly manumitted him.

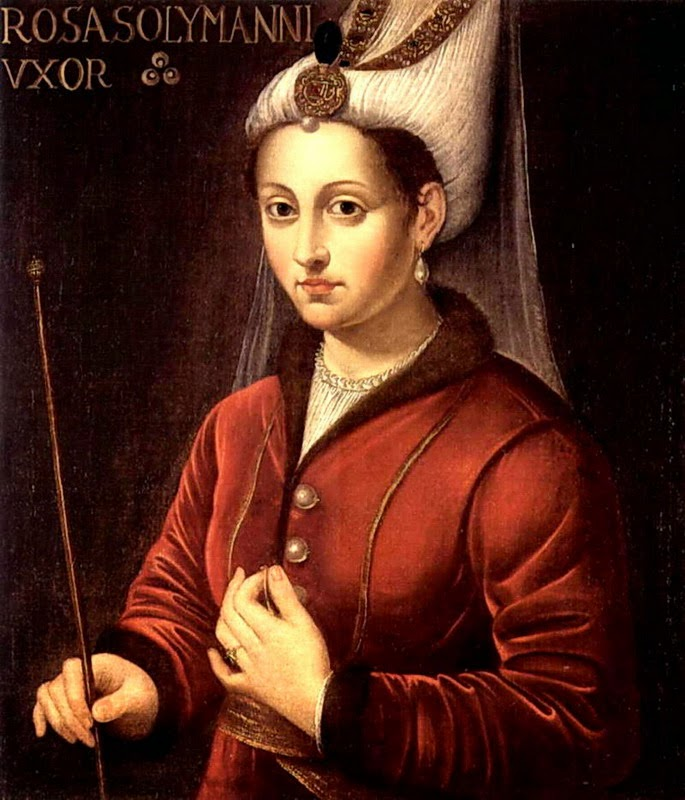
Roxelana, Ukrainian slave, first concubine to marry a Sultan

Harem slaves were a parallel case. Ehud R. Toledano has generalised the concept as kul/harem slavery. High status concubines, even if slaves, might own slaves. The Chief Black Eunuch was in charge of the harem or women's quarters, and since women (e.g. the Sultan's mother or favourite concubine) could be extremely powerful in politics and this eunuch was the go-between, he was a formidable personage, sometimes retiring with spectacular wealth. Black eunuchs could own slaves themselves, including white slaves. It became customary for the Chief Black Eunuch to retire to Cairo with slaves, even mamluks, purchased for his service.

Not only were the Sultan's officials his slaves: the houses of the highest Ottoman officials mimicked that of the sultan.

Being slaves, "the sultan could confiscate their property or take their lives, without due process, whenever he wished". High officials "were subject to a harsh palace-driven policy of demotion, dismissal, banishment, execution and property confiscation".

These measures seem to have created a game of Snakes and Ladders in which pashas were ... forfeiting their gains and properties, and starting anew several times during their careers. This policy [was] designed to keep as much power as possible in the hands of the sultan.

As the centuries passed, however, such confiscations and executions became infrequent, being reserved for exemplary cases "to remind Ottoman officials who was boss". Thus by the 19th century such officials were only nominally slaves.

==== Delhi Sultanate ====
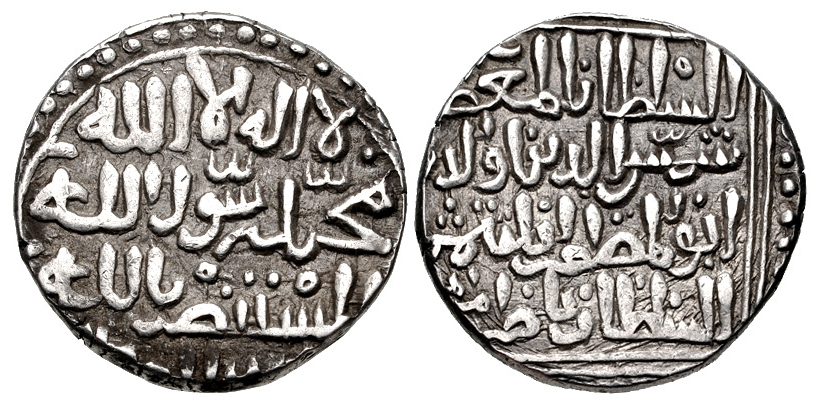
Iltutmish, slave of a slave, called himself 'Sultan of the Sultans' on his coins

The first Muslim sovereign to rule from Delhi, India, was Shams al-Din Iltutmish, who started his career as the slave of slave. Iltutmish when young was the slave of Quțb al-Din Aybak, a military commander who was himself the slave of Sultan Mu'izz al-Din Muhammad ibn Sam of Ghiir. An ethnic Turk, he acceded to the throne in 1211, and described himself on his coinage as "the Sultan of the Sultans of the East". It seems that Iltutmish was considered to have slave-status even after becoming king, being reproved for the illegitimacy of his rule for that reason; but his string of military victories "quelled such grumbling".

Here, a mamluk was known as a bandagān (pl. bandah). Military slaves were Iltutmsh's favoured subordinates "precisely because they were not 'nobles'". He urgently acquired, trained and deployed bandah to govern newly conquered territories. (A bandagān did not normally acquire under-slaves until his eighth year of training.). For example, Iltutmish established a tradition of slave-governors of the province of Lakhnauti; one of them sent him a present of elephants.

==== Awadh (Oudh) ====
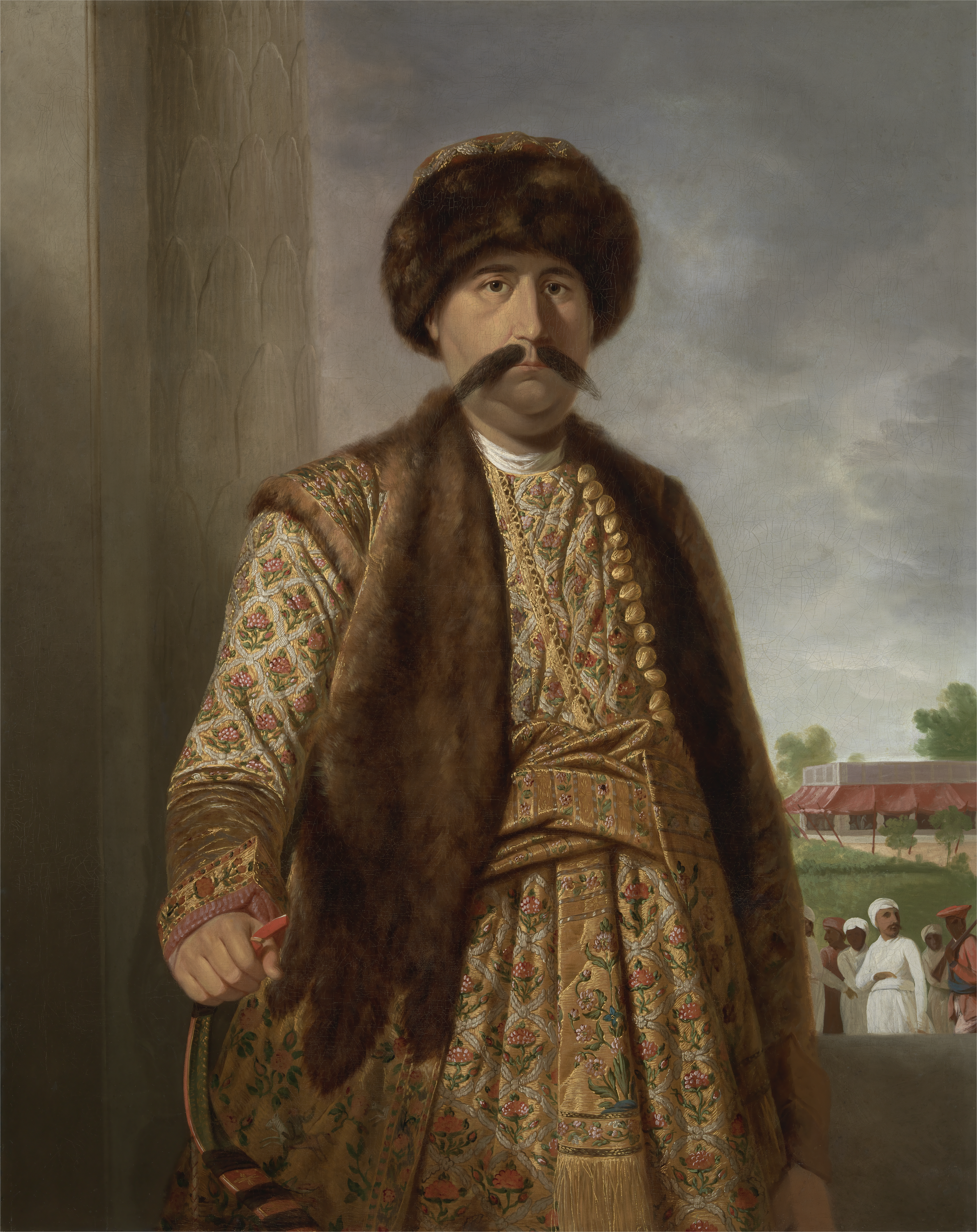
Shuja-ud-daula, Nawab of Oudh, famous for its eunuchs

The Mughal successor state of Awadh (Oudh), North India (1722–1856), was remarkable for the number of its eunuch slaves and the power some of them wielded. Eunuchs (Persian: khwājasarā; lit., “lord of the palace”) served not only as guardians of the women's quarters but as military commanders, tax farmers, administrators and advisers to the ruling nawabs.

It was forbidden in Islam to castrate Muslims and (theoretically) anyone else. Nawabs like Safdar Jang and Shuja-ud-daula purchased boys, often Hindus, from local "eunuch-makers"; the castrated boys were converted to Islam and trained in their duties. Some of these eunuchs, acquiring wealth, evaded the usury laws by lending money through their Hindu relatives.

A powerful eunuch might have a large establishment of his own, called a sarkār, employing hundreds of scribes, servants and slaves, where he raised young eunuch slaves, who might hope to emulate him some day. Such high-ranking men were slaves nevertheless, and were rarely manumitted by the rulers.

==== Africa ====
Sokoto Caliphate

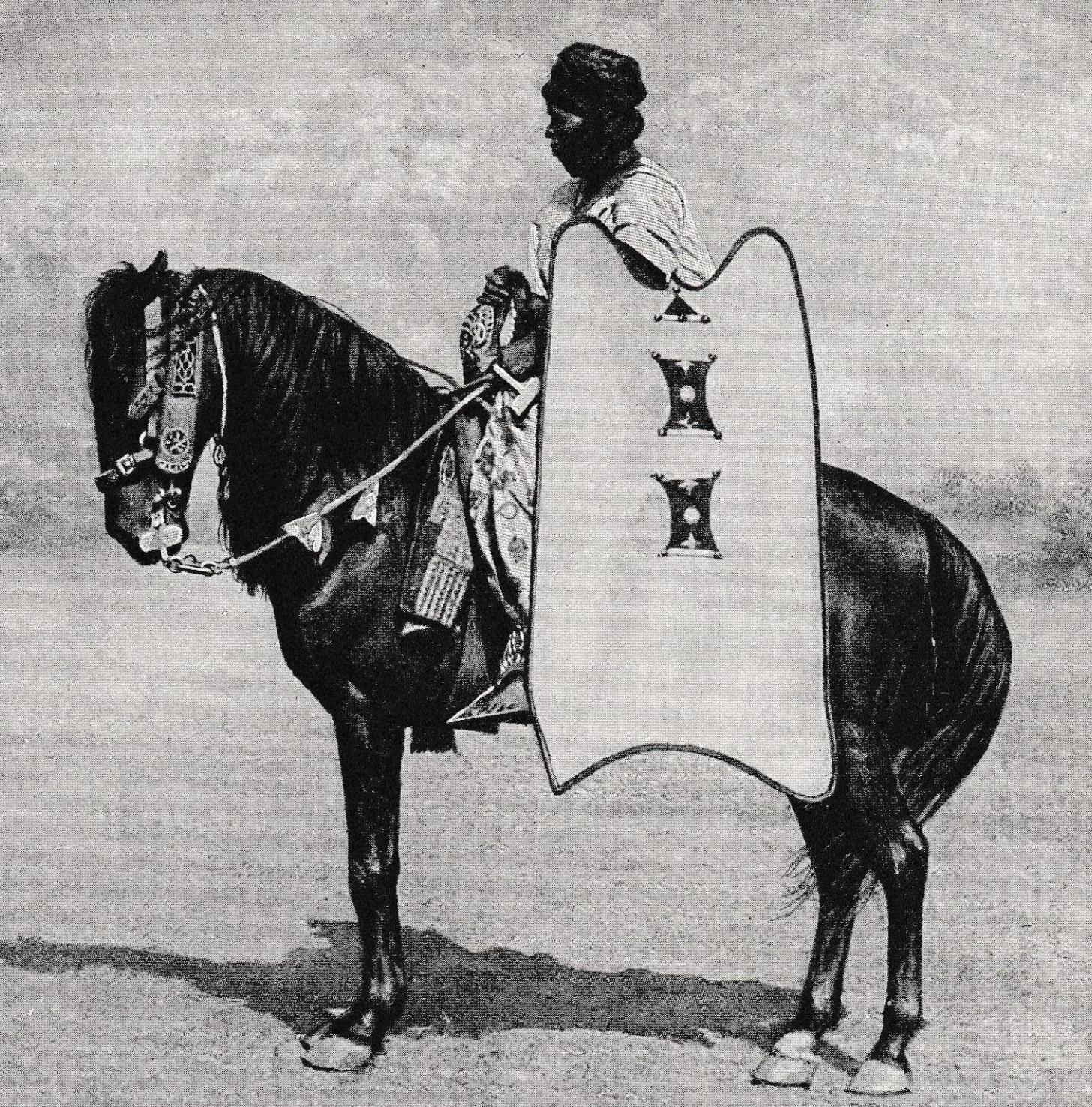
Sokoto cavalryman with oryx-hide shield

The Sokoto Caliphate (1804–1903) was the largest polity in pre-colonial Africa. It was a 1,000 x 400 mile (1,600 x 640 km) territory of 10 million people, at least half of whom were slaves. Originally founded as a result of a jihad or holy war, it may have held more slaves than any country in the world except the United States. The elite were Fulbe people but in time they came to speak the prevailing Hausa language.

As explained in this note, its economy depended on the continual acquisition of slaves, which were obtained by raiding neighbouring territories. Local rulers, called emirs, kept armies for the purpose.

Emirs kept numbers of elite slaves to serve as cavalrymen, collect taxes and otherwise administer their territories, tasks that required specialist knowledge. According to Sokoto historian Murray Last, these royal slaves formed high-status groups. They could "boss even the freeborn", since to disobey a royal slave was to disobey the emir. They controlled access to his presence, for which they expected heavy bribes. Hence for some captives enslaved as children, "the career as a slave led eventually to high political positions, even to owning many slaves of their own".

Despite their power and wealth, these men were slaves, for,

royal slaves were always at the mercy of their owner, the emir: to remind them of their slave status they had constantly to wear a goat-leather loincloth (warki) beneath their fine gown and trousers. In Islamic law, as slaves they were still not “full persons” like the freeborn. Nonetheless they acted as the emir’s closest advisors and allies: they had no kinsmen or lineages, other than the emir himself, to be loyal to.

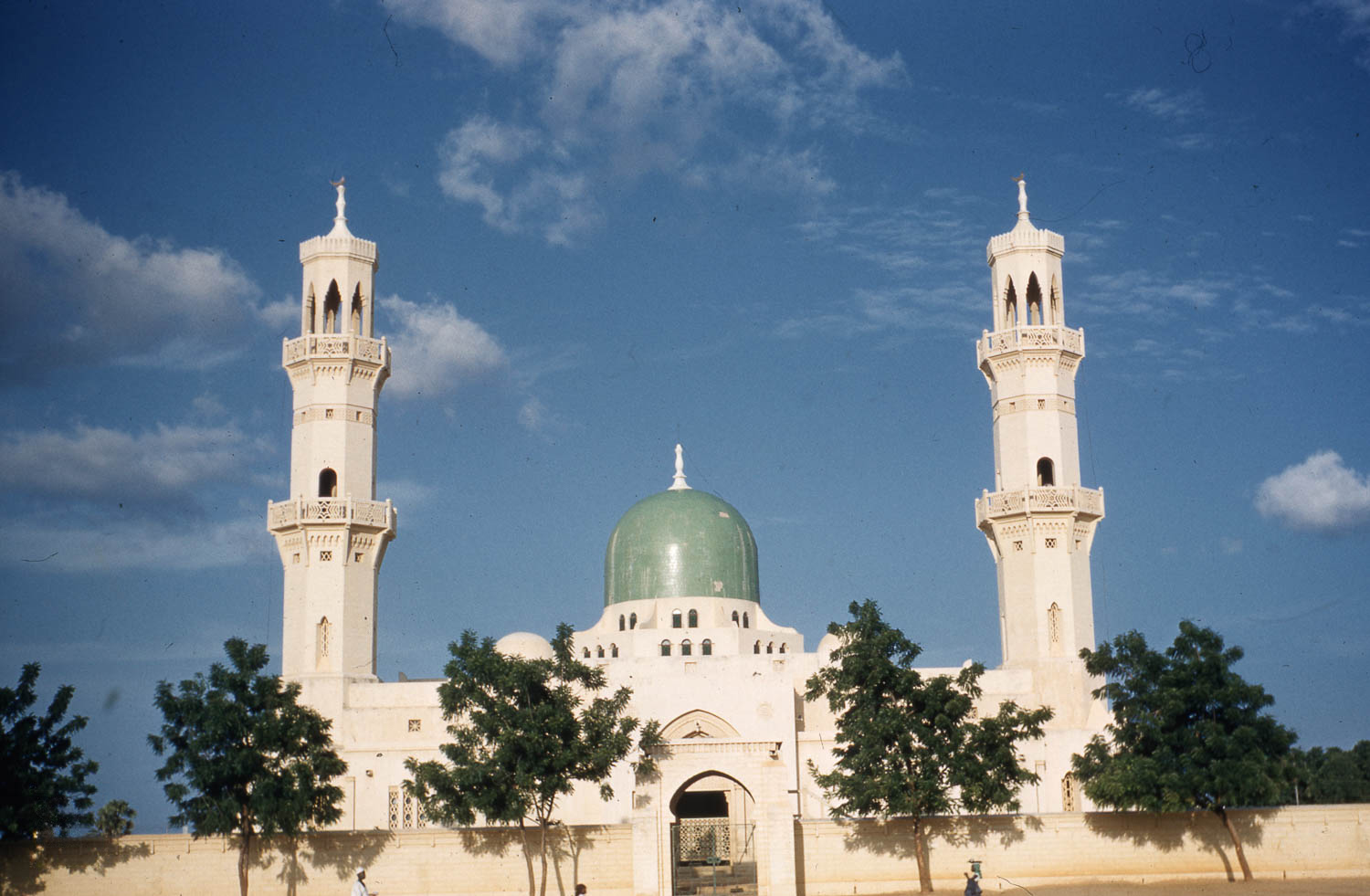
The Great Mosque of Kano. The Sokoto Caliphate was famous for its religious scholarship.

Slave-raiding, except in a genuine holy war, was contrary to Islamic law, but the law was evaded or misinterpreted. The original founders of the Sokoto Caliphate were religious purists who intended to reform corrupt customs and do away with extravagance and so much reliance on royal slaves, which they considered un-Islamic. And indeed the Caliphate was famous for its Islamic judicial system, scholarship, poetry, and writings, some in good classical Arabic. But the economic reality, said Last, was different:

The demand from North Africa for young slaves underwrote the caliphate’s wealth, and fostered among the caliphate’s own young a military ethos that ran counter to their forefathers’ pursuit of Islamic scholarship. Slaves rather than scholars ended up shaping and running the system... With child mortality at around 50 percent, the population needed to import children as captives.

It was found that the only way to keep the system going while maintaining law and order was to revert to a slave cavalry with elite slave officials and tax collectors. From the fact that the polity could not be reformed from within, even by strict Islamists, but had "to fall back on the expedient of slave soldiers as officials", American historian John Edward Philips argued that in no land was the Mamluk system a historical accident. "The political culture of the entire Islamic world has been warped by this institution of elite slaves, a fact which cannot be ignored in the struggle to modernize that world".

===== Emirate of Kano =====
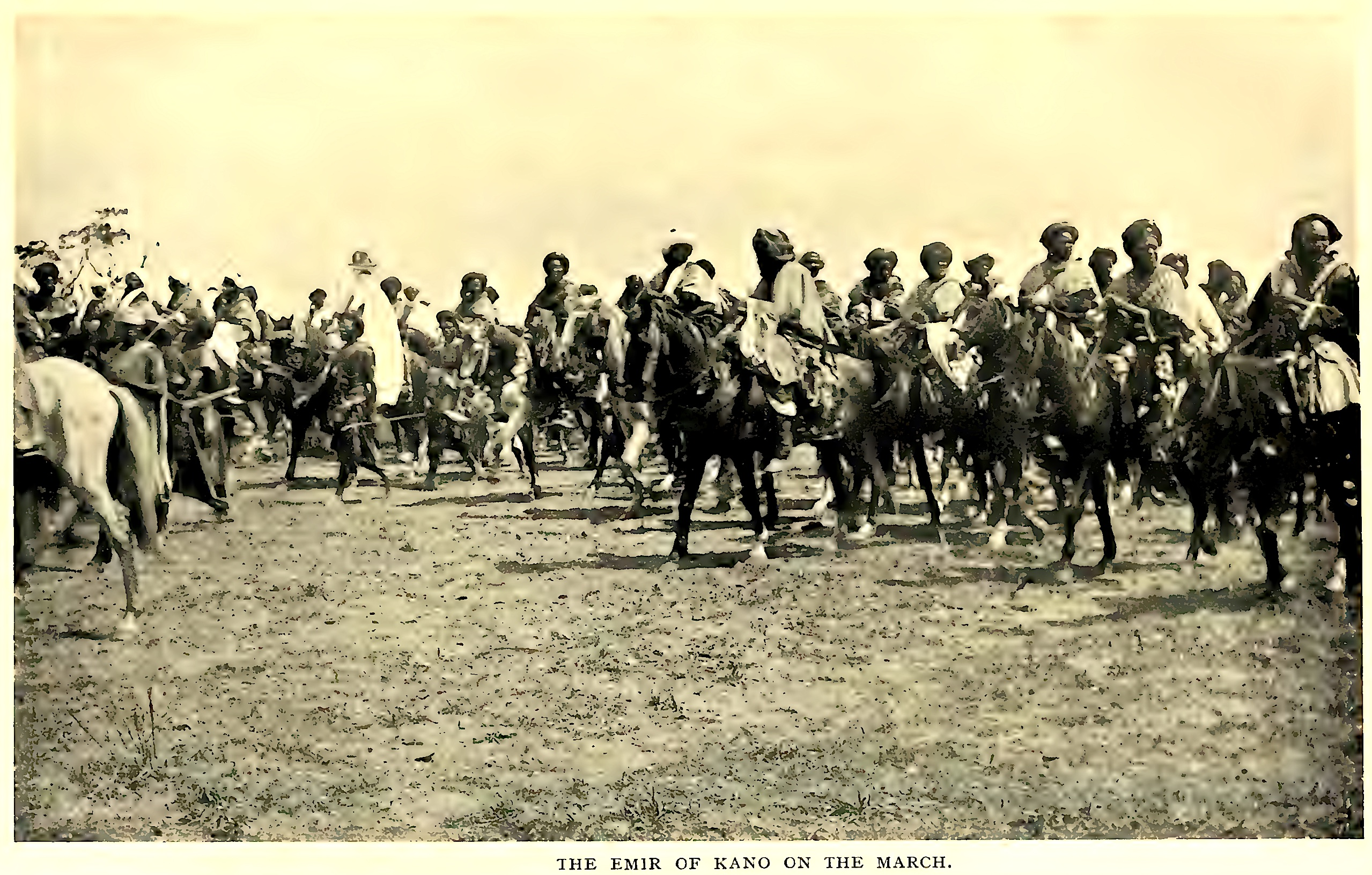
The Emir of Kano and his cavalry c. 1910

The Kano Emirate was a prominent part of the Sokoto Caliphate centred around Kano, a medieval walled city and terminus of the caravan trade. Perhaps as many as half the population were slaves. As in the Sokoto Caliphate generally, systematic enslavement was crucial to the economy. Even taxes were paid in slaves. The royal slaves of Kano have been studied by Sean Stilwell, who has examined oral traditions as well as written records.

Power was wielded by office-holders appointed by the emir; they held land and slaves. Some major offices were allocated to royal slaves. First-generation slaves were captured and brought to the Kano palace, where they were trained as warriors, and remained slaves through their careers. Elite slaves had access to the emir, and to bodies of knowledge crucial for running the government.

The royal slaves were the property of the emir, responsible to him alone. Always they were perceived and treated as slaves in the Kano society, and they held office at his pleasure. "The emir could transfer palace slaves to farms outside the palace, depose them, seize their possessions as well as execute them". Royal slaves were regularly deposed when new emirs came to the throne. "Should a royal slave lose his [office], he effectively lost his ability to manage land, confiscate property and provide for his household, who usually left him to join a more prosperous title-holder", said Stilwell. They were valuable to the emir if, and only if, they were slaves; since they could not compete for the throne or inherit titles or property.

Second-generation slaves were called cucanawa and were more likely to have palace roles. The word meant something like "shameless" or "impudent"—they joshed the emir's sons—and they could deal rudely with free persons, from whom they had nothing to fear, for none but the emir could discipline them. Some were thought to be presumptuous, arrogant or brutal, but to retaliate was to risk insulting the emir himself.

In practice royal slaves could often extort property from freemen, elite or commoner. One slave, asked to itemise his property, listed 20 sub-slaves, horses, cattle, and numerous concubines. Another was said to have fifty concubines. The German ethnologist Paul Staudinger observed (1889):

[M]any a freeman has to bow before them. They keep slaves themselves. The king's slaves often distinguish themselves by impertinent and violent behavior ... it is best not to get involved in quarrels with them, as their owner, to whom they have made themselves indispensable usually lets them off scot free.

===== Emirate of Ilorin =====
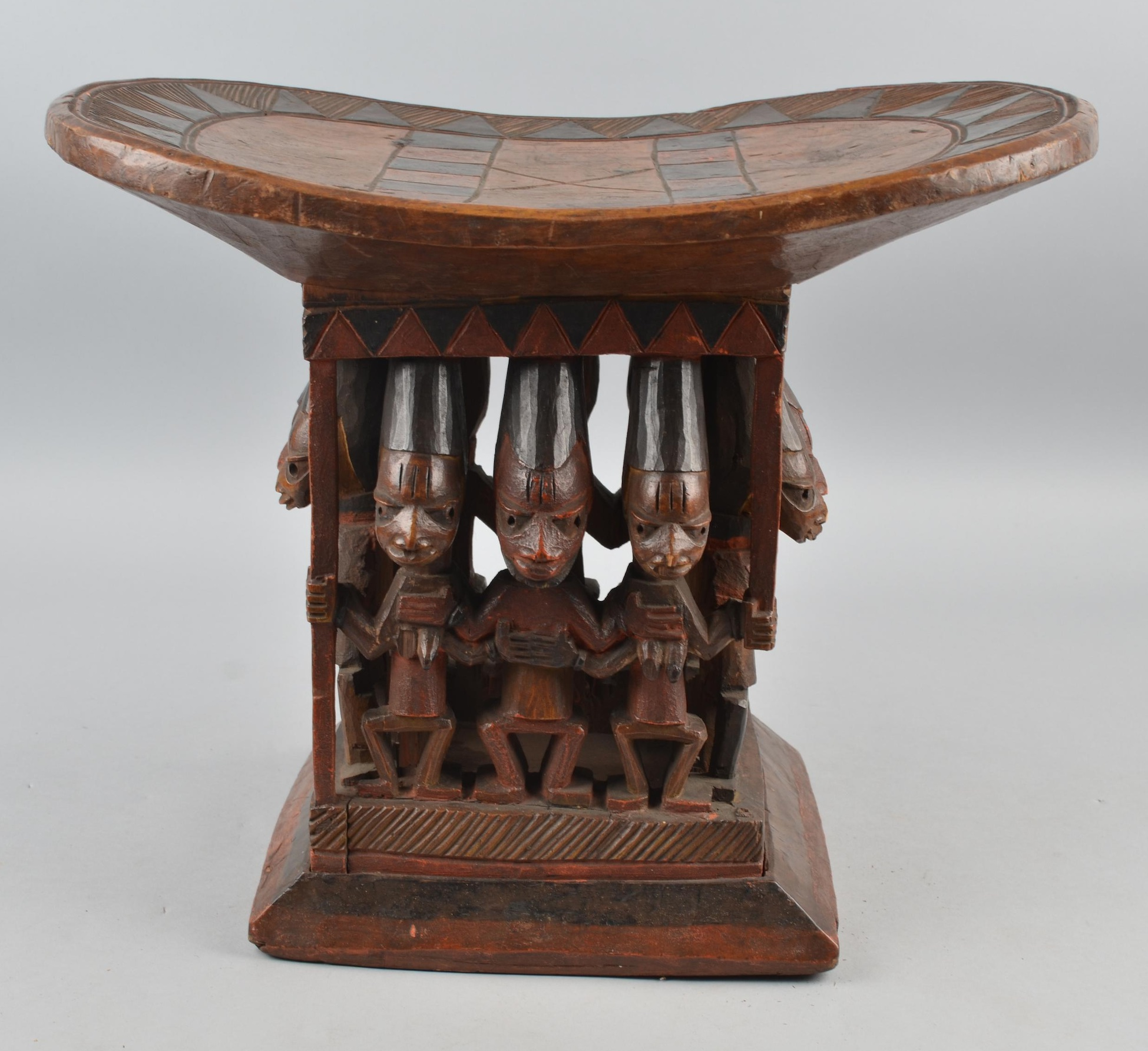
Carved Yoruba stool c. 1900. The supporting human figures may denote elite slaves. (British Museum.)

On the southern frontier of the Sokoto Caliphate was the Ilorin Emirate, a Yoruba language polity that still exists as part of the Federal Republic of Nigeria. In the 19th and early 20th-centuries it had elite slaves belonging to the emir. They were often used in military roles. The Jimba family were warrior slaves—at one time in charge of the state's gunpowder—who were able to amass many slaves of their own; there was even a slave-market named after them. The title ajia was bestowed on elite slaves who captured slaves in war and turned them into loyal battalions to fight for Ilorin.

The baba kekere were elite slaves who controlled access to the Emir and who, like the eunuchs of medieval Byzantium, required payment for providing it. The royal slave Ogunkojole (alias Alihu) was described as "practically prime minister, very wealthy and possessing many slaves of his own".

Scholar Ann O'Hear found that Ilorin was a transitional case. Unlike the non-hereditary 'slave aristocracies' of the Middle East and Kano, the elite slaves of Ilorin were permitted to own and inherit land. and were given hereditary titles. It was weakness on the part of the emirs since it gradually eroded their royal patronage power. Underlings syphoned off captured slaves and other war booty to their own use. On one elite slave the emir conferred the joke title Nasama ("I got him"), intended to remind the bearer that he was a still a slave. Some elite slaves became rebellious and in 1895 the Emir was defeated, blowing himself up in the state's powder magazine together with faithful royal slave Ogunkojole/Alihu.

Ilorin became a British protectorate in 1900, being ruled indirectly through the emirs. The new colonial authorities were supposed to suppress slavery. The elite slave-owning slaves were strongly opposed to this, however, and were too well entrenched to be easily displaced. It was not until 1936 that their power was finally broken.

===== Ibadan, West Africa =====
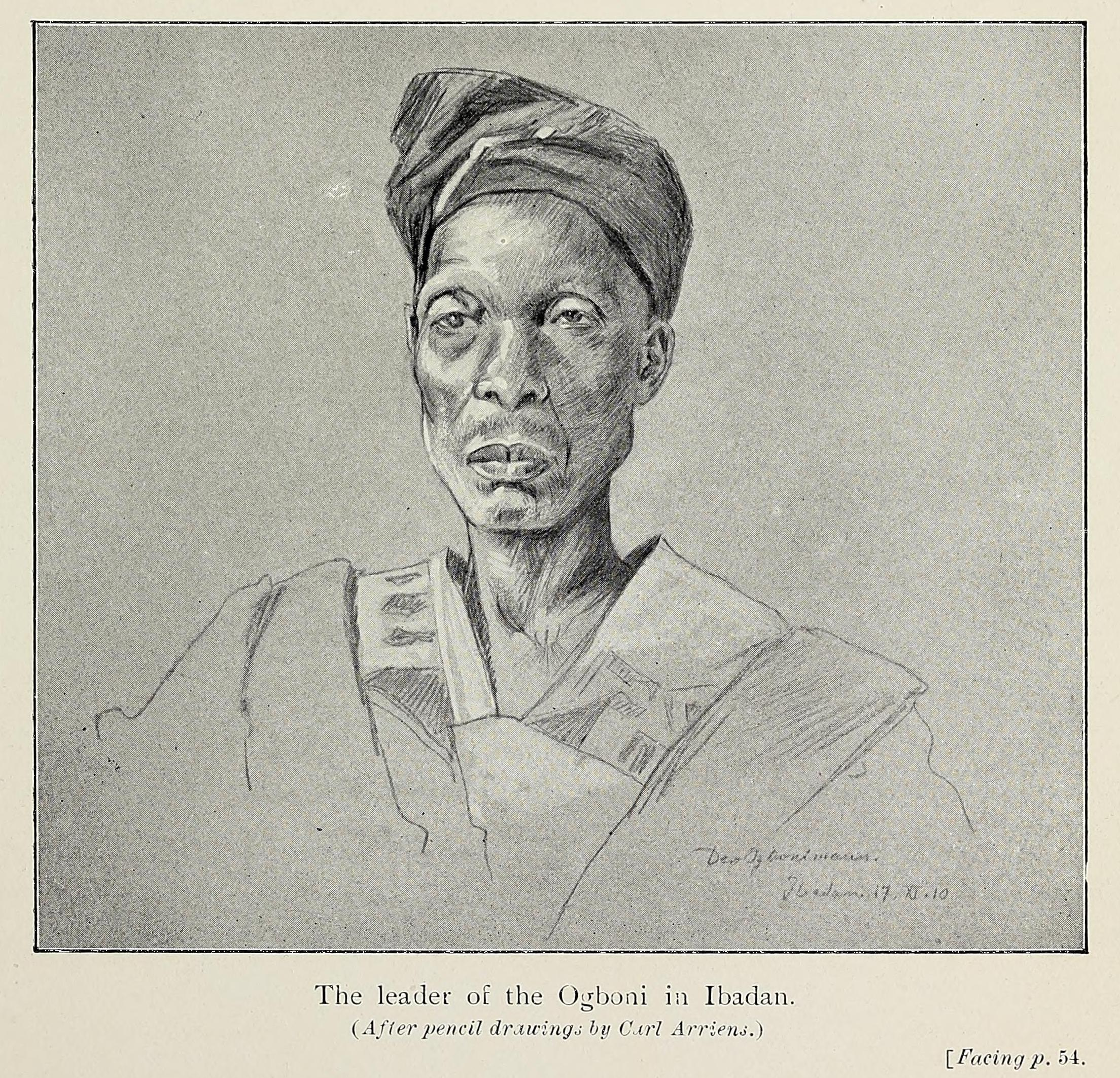
High status Yoruba man, Ibadan (Carl Arriens, pencil sketch, 1910)

Ibadan (1850–1900) was a military state in Yorubaland, West Africa. Starting as a war-camp it grew to become the capital of an empire, a transformation which required a very large number of slaves, which it obtained by warfare and raiding expeditions. Slaves served as soldiers, agricultural labourers and menials.

The war chiefs promoted some slaves to privileged positions, such as ajele (governor of a colony), farm village chief, toll collector, diplomat or spy. They were preferred over free men because they were thought to be more loyal or else they would be instantly degraded or sold. These elite slaves acquired slaves of their own, buying them in the market or capturing them in war, and had enormous power over them, which they frequently abused. Nigerian historian Toyin Falola found that they had a reputation for extravagance and cruelty, and were hated and feared by the slaves they controlled.

[S]ince they were not sure of when their privileges would be withdrawn, or when they would die or fall out of favor with their masters, some believed they should have the best out of life by engaging in excessive eating and drinking and also in a reckless exercise of power.

Slaves fled en masse from Ibadan in the 1890s when British colonial power intervened.

=== Muscovy (Russia) ===
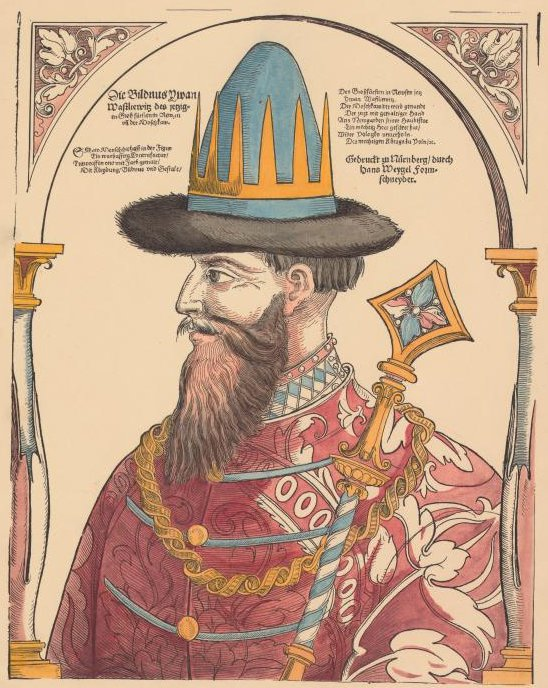
Ivan IV ("Ivan the Terrible"). Grand Prince of Moscow and all Russia

In early Muscovy a substantial part of the population were designated kholoptsvo. Although the legal status of these people is a matter of debate, Richard Hellie had no doubt they were slaves according to most definitions. Thus they could be beaten by their owners—sometimes to death—and their children could be sold separately. The vast majority were ethnic Russians and were owned by the landed service classes.

A few of these slaves were skilled managers. Some were government administrators, running palace offices or assisting provincial governors. Others managed country estates, and were in fact crucial, because their owners were obliged to be absent on government service.

The Muscovite records are full of the activities of these people, who purchased other slaves for their owners, negotiated tax and postal levies with governmental officials, defended their owners' peasants and ordinary slaves from other landholders and official depredations, collected the rent due from the peasants, represented their owners (and others) in court, and fulfilled many other duties.

This class of slave could and did own slaves of their own. They were sometimes called dokladnoe, or registered, slaves. By the 1630s, however, discrimination had set in, and they were forbidden to own slaves or land, a privilege now reserved for the middle and upper service classes and townsmen.

=== Imperial China ===
==== Han dynasty ====
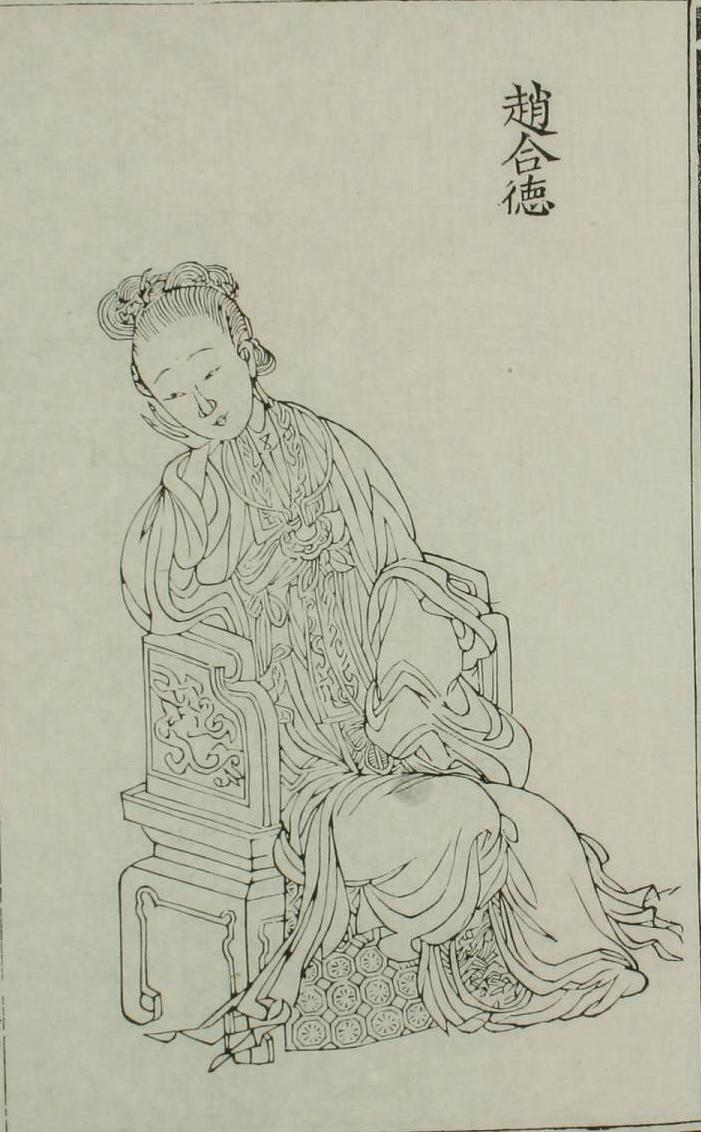
Murder suspect Zhao Hede ("Brilliant Companion")

Comparatively little has been written about the history of slavery in China. Contemporary Chinese historians were seldom interested in the institution, only mentioning it in passing if relevant to some other matter. Columbia historian C. Martin Wilbur, by compiling a large number of these incidental passages and putting the events in chronological sequence, was the first to write a monograph on slavery during the early Han dynasty.

One fragment he studied, which is preserved in the Book of the Former Han (前漢書; Qián Hàn shū), happens to mention slaves of slaves twice. It is a report of a murder inquiry. In 7 BC the Emperor Cheng died in suspicious circumstances; investigators interrogated the palace staff, including eunuchs and other slaves. The chief suspect, concubine Brilliant Companion, fearing three middle-ranking slave women might talk, gave each of them ten sub-slaves for their entourage, presumably to keep an eye on them. It also transpired that an educated slave-woman, a poet, had borne the Emperor's son. The wildy jealous Brilliant Companion had bullied the Emperor into having mother and baby killed, followed by six of the mother's sub-slaves who knew too much.

==== Yuan dynasty ====
A Japanese historian mentioned that in the Yuan dynasty slaves could own slaves; such double slaves were called chongtai (重臺). How it arose is not explained.

== Sources ==
- Abatino, Barbara; Dari-Mattiaci, Giuseppe; Perotti, Enrico C. (2011). "Depersonalization of Business in Ancient Rome". Oxford Journal of Legal Studies. 31 (2): 365–389. doi:10.1093/ojls/gqr001. JSTOR 23014692.
- Abbott, Nicholas (2020). "'In that One the Ālif is Missing'". Journal of the Economic and Social History of the Orient. 63 (1/2): 73–116. doi:10.1163/15685209-12341505. JSTOR 26872257.
- Allain, Jean; Hickey, Robin (2012). "Property and the Definition of Slavery". The International and Comparative Law Quarterly. 61 (4): 915–938. doi:10.1017/S0020589312000450. JSTOR 23279811.
- Aubert, Jean-Jacques (2009). "Productive Investments in Agriculture: Instrumentum Fundi and Peculium in the Later Roman Republic". In Jesper Carlsen; Elio Cascio (eds.). Agricoltura e scambi nell'Italia tardo-repubblicana. Edipuglia. pp. 167–185.
- Aubert, Jean-Jacques (2013). "Dumtaxat de peculio: What's in a Peculium, or Establishing the Extent of the Principal's Liability". In Paul J. du Plessis (ed.). New Frontiers: Law and Society in the Roman World. Edinburgh University Press. pp. 192–206. ISBN 978-0-7486-6817-5. JSTOR 10.3366/j.ctt3fgt2d.14.
- Baade, Hans W. (1988). "Review: "Roman Slave Law" by William Alexander Jardine Watson". University of Pennsylvania Law Review. 136 (5): 1547–1551. doi:10.2307/3312294. JSTOR 3312294.
- Bano, Shadab (1998). "The Acquisition and Trade of Elite Slaves in the Thirteenth Century". Proceedings of the Indian History Congress. 59: 229–236. JSTOR 44146993.
- Barkey, Karen (2016). "The Ottoman Empire (1299-1923): The Bureaucratization of Patrimonial Authority". In Peter Crooks; Timothy Parsons (eds.). Empire and Bureaucracy: From Late Antiquity to the Twentieth Century. Cambridge University Press. ISBN 9781107166035.
- Bay, Elihu Hall (1809). "The Guardian of Sally, a Negro v. Beaty (1792)". Reports of Cases Argued and Determined in the Superior Courts of Law in the State of South-Carolina. Vol. I. New York: E. Riley.
- Beal, Frances M. (1975). "Slave of a Slave No More: Black Women in Struggle". The Black Scholar. 6 (6, The Black Woman): 2–10. doi:10.1080/00064246.1975.11431488. JSTOR 41065823.
- Beckles, Hilary McD. (1998). "Creolisation in Action: The Slave Labour Élite and Anti-Slavery in Barbados". Caribbean Quarterly. 44 (1/2): 108–128. doi:10.1080/00086495.1998.11829574. JSTOR 40654025.
- Berger, Adolf (1953). "Encyclopedic Dictionary of Roman Law". Transactions of the American Philosophical Society. 43 (2): 333–809. doi:10.2307/1005773. JSTOR 1005773.
- Bodel, John (2019). "Ancient slavery and modern ideologies: Orlando Patterson and M. I. Finley among the dons". Theory and Society. 48 (6): 823–833. doi:10.1007/s11186-019-09366-0. JSTOR 45284475.
- Brown, Carolyn A. (1996). "Testing the Boundaries of Marginality: Twentieth-Century Slavery and Emancipation Struggles in Nkanu, Northern Igboland, 1920-29". The Journal of African History. 37 (1): 51–80. doi:10.1017/S0021853700034794. JSTOR 183288.
- Buckland, William Warwick (1908). The Roman Law of Slavery: The Condition of the Slave in Private Law from Augustus to Justinian. Cambridge University Press.
- Burton, Richard F. (1857). Personal Narrative of a Pilgrimage to El Medinah and Meccah. Vol. I (2nd ed.). London: Longman, Brown, Green, Longmans & Roberts.
- Clark, Andrew F. (1992). "The Challenges of Cross-Cultural Oral History: Collecting and Presenting Pulaar Traditions on Slavery from Bundu, Senegambia (West Africa)". The Oral History Review. 20 (1/2): 1–21. doi:10.1093/ohr/20.1.1. JSTOR 3674851.
- Clauss, Manfred; Kolb, Ann; Slaby, Wolfgang A.; Woitas, Barbara. "Welcome!". Epigraphik-Datenbank Clauss / Slaby.
- Cohen, Boaz (1951). "Peculium in Jewish and Roman Law". Proceedings of the American Academy for Jewish Research. 20: 135–234. doi:10.2307/3622171. JSTOR 3622171.
- Coser, Lewis A. (1972). "The Alien as a Servant of Power: Court Jews and Christian Renegades". American Sociological Review. 37 (5): 574–581. doi:10.2307/2093452. JSTOR 2093452.
- Cronin, Stephanie (2016), "Islam, slave agency and abolitionism in Iran, the Middle East and North Africa.", Middle Eastern Studies, 52 (6): 953–977, doi:10.1080/00263206.2016.1198326
- Dampier, William (1699). Voyages and Descriptions: A Supplement of the Voyage round the World, Describing the Countreys of Tonkin, Achin, Malacca, &c, their Product, Inhabitants, Manners, Trade, Policy, &c. Vol. II. London: James Knapton.
- Dennys, Nicholas Bellfield (1894). A Descriptive Dictionary of British Malaya. London: "London and China Telegraph" Office.
- Eaton, Richard M. (2019). India in the Persianate Age: 1000 to 1765. London: Penguin. ISBN 978-0141985398.
- Edaljī, Shāpurjī (1868). A Dictionary, Gujarátí and English (2nd ed.). Bombay: N. R. Rániná.
- Erman, H. (1896). Servus vicarius: l'esclave de l'esclave romain (in French). Lausanne: F. Rouse (University of Lausanne Press).
- Falola, Toyin (1987). "Power Relations and Social Interactions among Ibadan Slaves, 1850-1900". African Economic History. 16 (16): 95–114. doi:10.2307/3601271. JSTOR 3601271.
- Fleckner, Andreas M. (2014). "The Peculium: A Legal Device for Donations to personae alieno iuri subiectae?". In Carlà-Uhink, Filippo; Gori, Maja (eds.). Gift Giving and the Embedded Economy in the Ancient World. Heidelberg: Universitätsverlag Winter.
- Gamauf, Richard (2023). "Peculium: Paradoxes of Slaves With Property". In Schermaier, Martin (ed.). The Position of Roman Slaves: Social Realities and Legal Differences. Berlin and Boston: De Gruyter. pp. 87–124. doi:10.1515/9783110987195. hdl:20.500.12657/63513. ISBN 978-3-11-098719-5.
- Glancy, Jennifer A. (2000). "Slaves and Slavery in the Matthean Parables". Journal of Biblical Literature. 119 (1): 67–90. doi:10.2307/3267969. JSTOR 3267969.
- Hambly, Gavin (1972). "Who Were the Chihilgānī, the Forty Slaves of Sulṭān Shams Al-Dīn Iltutmish of Delhi?". Iran. 10: 57–62. doi:10.2307/4300465. JSTOR 4300465.
- Hathaway, Jane (2009). "Eunuch Households in Istanbul, Medina, and Cairo during the Ottoman Era". Turcica. 41: 291–303. doi:10.2143/TURC.41.0.2049297.
- Hathaway, Jane (2019). "The Ottoman Chief Harem Eunuch in Ceremonies and Festivals". Journal of the Ottoman and Turkish Studies Association. 6 (1, Ceremonies, Festivals, and Rituals in the Ottoman World): 21–37. doi:10.2979/jottturstuass.6.1.04. JSTOR 10.2979/jottturstuass.6.1.04.
- Hellie, Richard (1979). "Muscovite Slavery in Comparative Perspective". Russian History. 6 (2 (New Perspectives on Muscovite History)): 133–209. doi:10.1163/187633179X00087. JSTOR 24652404.
- Hill, Polly (1976). "From Slavery to Freedom: The Case of Farm-Slavery in Nigerian Hausaland". Comparative Studies in Society and History. 18 (3): 395–426. doi:10.1017/S0010417500008331. JSTOR 178344.
- Hopkins, Keith (1963). "Eunuchs in Politics in the Later Roman Empire". Proceedings of the Cambridge Philological Society. 9 (189): 62–80. doi:10.1017/S1750270500001408. JSTOR 44712441.
- Johnson, Lyman L. (1979). "Manumission in Colonial Buenos Aires, 1776-1810". The Hispanic American Historical Review. 59 (2): 258–279. doi:10.2307/2514414. JSTOR 2514414.
- Karlach, Jan (2023). "Hearths, Mythologies, and Livelihood Choices: Exploring Cultural Change under Poverty Alleviation with the Nuosu-Yi of Liangshan". Modern China. 49 (5): 532–563. doi:10.1177/00977004221141051.
- Kleiner, Diana E.E. (1976). Roman Group Portraiture: The Funerary Reliefs of the Late Republic and Early Empire (PDF) (PhD thesis). Columbia University.
- Koops, Egbert (2020). "The Practice of Manumission through Negotiated Conditions in Imperial Rome". In Giuseppi Dari-Mattiacci; Dennis P. Kehoe (eds.). Roman Law and Economics. Vol. II: Exchange, Ownership and Disputes. Oxford: Oxford University Press. pp. 35–80. doi:10.1093/oso/9780198787211.003.0014. ISBN 978-0-19-878721-1.
- Kumar, Sunil (1994). "When Slaves were Nobles: The Shamsî Bandagân in the Early Delhi Sultanate". Studies in History. 10 (1): 23–52. doi:10.1177/025764309401000102.
- Kunt, Metin (2005). "Ottomans and Safavids States, Statecraft, and Societies, 1500–1800". In Youssef M. Choueiri (ed.). A Companion to the History of the Middle East (PDF). Oxford: Blackwell. pp. 191–205. ISBN 978-1405106818.
- Kunt, Metin (2011). "Turks in the Ottoman Imperial Palace". In Jeroen Duindam; Tülay Artan; Metin Kunt (eds.). Royal Courts in Dynastic States and Empires: A Global Perspective. Leiden and Boston: Brill. pp. 289–312. doi:10.1163/ej.9789004206229.i-444. hdl:20.500.12657/38167. ISBN 9789004206236.
- Lambert, Craig (2014). "The Caribbean Zola: Orlando Patterson may be the last of Harvard sociology's big thinkers". Harvard Magazine.
- Lapidus, Ira M. (1982). "Review: Slave Soldiers and Islam: Genesis of the Military System by Daniel Pipes". The Journal of Interdisciplinary History. 12 (4): 716–718. doi:10.2307/203568. JSTOR 203568.
- Last, Murray (2021). "Slavery and the Slave Trade in the Sokoto Caliphate Murray". Oxford Research Encyclopedia of African History. Oxford University Press. doi:10.1093/acrefore/9780190277734.013.882.
- Lenski, Noel (2021). "Slavery in the Byzantine Empire". In Craig Perry; David Eltis; Stanley L. Engerman; David Richardson (eds.). The Cambridge World History of Slavery. Vol. 2. Cambridge University Press. doi:10.1017/9781139024723. ISBN 978-0-521-84067-5.
- Lightner, David L.; Ragan, Alexander M. (2005). "Were African American Slaveholders Benevolent or Exploitative? A Quantitative Approach". The Journal of Southern History. 71 (3): 535–558. doi:10.2307/27648819. JSTOR 27648819.
- López Barja de Quiroga, Pedro (1995). "Freedmen Social Mobility in Roman Italy". Historia: Zeitschrift für Alte Geschichte. 44 (3): 326–348. JSTOR 4436383.
- Lovejoy, Paul E. (1990). "Concubinage in the Sokoto caliphate (1804–1903)". Slavery & Abolition. 11 (2): 159–189. doi:10.1080/01440399008575005.
- Maxwell, W.E. (1890). "The Law Relating to Slavery Among the Malays". Journal of the Straits Branch of the Royal Asiatic Society. 22 (22): 247–297. JSTOR 41560788.
- McDermott, W.C. (1983). "Mamurra, "Eques Formianus"". Rheinisches Museum für Philologie. Neue Folge. 126 (3/4). J.D. Sauerländers Verlag: 292–307. JSTOR 41233489.
- McInerney, Jeremy (2019). "Interpreting Funerary Inscriptions from the City of Rome". Journal of Ancient History. 7 (1): 156–206. doi:10.1515/jah-2019-0008.
- Ménage, V.L. (1966). "Some Notes on the Devshirme". Bulletin of the School of Oriental and African Studies, University of London. 29 (1): 64–78. doi:10.1017/S0041977X0006081X. JSTOR 611094.
- Moore, Gene M. (2007). "Slavery and Racism in Joseph Conrad's Eastern World". Journal of Modern Literature. 30 (4, Reading from the Margins of Modernism): 20–38. doi:10.2979/JML.2007.30.4.20. JSTOR 30053144.
- Morgan, Philip D. (1983). "The Ownership of Property by Slaves in the Mid-Nineteenth-Century Low Country". The Journal of Southern History. 49 (3): 399–420. doi:10.2307/2208102. JSTOR 2208102.
- Morris, Thomas D. (1988). "'Villeinage ... as It Existed in England, Reflects but Little Light on Our Subject': The Problem of the 'Sources' of Southern Slave Law". American Journal of Legal History. 32 (2): 95–137. doi:10.2307/845699. JSTOR 845699.
- Nishida, Mieko (1993). "Manumission and Ethnicity in Urban Slavery: Salvador, Brazil, 1808-1888". The Hispanic American Historical Review. 73 (3): 361–391. doi:10.2307/2517695. JSTOR 2517695.
- O'Hear, Ann (2006). "Elite Slaves in Ilorin in the Nineteenth and Twentieth Centuries". The International Journal of African Historical Studies. 39 (2): 247–273. JSTOR 40033860.
- Parsons, Lucy E. (1905). "Speeches at the Founding Convention of the Industrial Workers of the World" (PDF).
- Patterson, Orlando (2018). Slavery and Social Death: a Comparative Study (2nd ed.). Harvard University Press. ISBN 978-0-674-98690-9.
- Pedrosa Costa, Robson (2021). "Nicolau de Souza: the trajectory of a slave-owning slave, Brazil, 1812-1835". Forum Historiae Juris (11.05.2021). doi:10.26032/fhi-2021-006.
- Pelloso, Carlo (2018). "Serviles personae in Roman Law: 'Paradox' or 'Otherness'?" (PDF). Journal of Global Slavery. 3 (1–2): 92–128. doi:10.1163/2405836X-00301006.
- Perret, Daniel (2011). "From Slave to King: The Role of South Asians in Maritime Southeast Asia (from the late 13th to the late 17th century)". Archipel. 82: 159–199. doi:10.3406/arch.2011.4261.
- Philips, John Edward (2000). "The Persistence of Slave Officials in the Sokoto Caliphate". In Miura Toru; John Edward Philips (eds.). Slave Elites in the Middle East and Africa: a Comparative Study. London and New York: Kegan Paul. ISBN 0710306601.
- Platts, John T. (1884). A Dictionary of Urdū, Classical Hindī, and English. London: Sampson, Low, Marston.
- Plutarch (1886). Lives of Alcibiades & Coriolanus, Aristides & Cato the Censor. Translated by J. & W. Langhorne. New York: Cassell.
- Reginaldo, Lucilene (2021). "André do Couto Godinho". Oxford Research Encyclopedia of African History. doi:10.1093/acrefore/9780190277734.013.962. ISBN 978-0-19-027773-4.
- Reis, João José (2022). "Esclavos dueños de esclavos en Bahía, Brasil, siglo XIX". Convivivialidad y desigualdad: explorando los nexos entre lo que nos une y lo que nos separa (PDF) (in Spanish). CLACSO. pp. 441–476. JSTOR j.ctv2v88c0m.14.
- Repp, R.C. (1968). "Notes and Communications: A Further Note on Devshirme". Bulletin of the School of Oriental and African Studies, University of London. 31 (1): 137–139. doi:10.1017/S0041977X00112820. JSTOR 612007.
- Roth, Ulrike (2010). "Peculium, Freedom, Citizenship: Golden Triangle or Vicious Circle? An Act In Two Parts" (PDF). Bulletin of the Institute of Classical Studies. Supplement. 109 (By the Sweat of your Brow: Roman Slavery in its Socio-Economic Setting): 91–120. doi:10.1111/j.2041-5370.2010.tb00103.x. JSTOR 44215126.
- Salau, Mohammed Bashir (2018). Plantation Slavery in the Sokoto Caliphate: A Historical and Comparative Study. NY: University of Rochester Press. doi:10.1017/9781787444133. ISBN 978-1-58046-938-8.
- Schmuck, Stephan (2012). "Review: Roxolana in European Literature, History and Culture by Galina I.cYermolenko". Renaissance Studies. 26 (3): 466–468. doi:10.1111/j.1477-4658.2011.00757.x. JSTOR 24420078.
- Schumacher, Leonhard (2010). "On the Status of Private Actores, Dispensatores and Vilici". Bulletin of the Institute of Classical Studies. Supplement. 53 (109, By the Sweat of Your Brow: Roman Slavery in its Socio-Economic Setting (2010)): 31–47. doi:10.1111/j.2041-5370.2010.tb00099.x. JSTOR 44215122.
- Schwartz, Stuart B. (1974). "The Manumission of Slaves in Colonial Brazil: Bahia, 1684-1745". The Hispanic American Historical Review. 54 (4): 603–635. doi:10.2307/2512892. JSTOR 2512892.
- Schwartz, Stuart B. (1986). "Slavery and Social Death: A Comparative Study, by Orlando Patterson". Contemporary Sociology. 15 (3): 357–359. doi:10.2307/2069997. JSTOR 2069997.
- Silver, Morris (2016). "At the base of Rome's peculium economy" (PDF). Fundamina. 22 (1): 67–93. doi:10.17159/2411-7870/2016/v22n1a5.
- Stilwell, Sean Arnold (1999). The Kano Mamluks: Royal Slavery in the Sokoto Caliphate, 1807-1903 (PhD thesis). Ontario: York University – via National Library of Canada.
- Stilwell, Sean (2000). "Power, Honour and Shame: The Ideology of Royal Slavery in the Sokoto Caliphate". Africa: Journal of the International African Institute. 70 (3): 394–421. doi:10.2307/1161067. JSTOR 1161067.
- Teng, Ssŭ-yü (1943). "Review: Slavery in China During the Former Han Dynasty, 206 B.C.-A.D. 25 by C. Martin Wilbur". The Far Eastern Quarterly. 2 (4): 408–410. doi:10.2307/2049260. JSTOR 2049260.
- Thébert, Yvon (1993). "The Slave". In Andrea Giradina (ed.). The Romans. Translated by Lydia G. Cochrane. University of Chicago Press. ISBN 0-226-29049-2.
- Toledano, Ehud R. (1993). "Late Ottoman Concepts of Slavery (1830s-1880s)". Poetics Today. 14 (3, Cultural Processes in Muslim and Arab Societies: Modern Period I): 477–506. doi:10.2307/1773282. JSTOR 1773282.
- Toledano, Ehud R. (2000). "The Concept of Slavery in Ottoman and Muslim Societies: Dichotomy or Continuum". In Miura Toru; John Edward Philips (eds.). Slave Elites in the Middle East and Africa: A Comparative Study. London and New York: Kegan Paul International. ISBN 0710306601.
- Tomlin, R.S.O. (2003). "'The Girl in Question': A New Text from Roman London". Britannia. 34: 41–51. doi:10.2307/3558537. JSTOR 3558537.
- Veinstein, Gilles (2015). "On the Ottoman janissaries (fourteenth-nineteenth centuries)". In Erik-Jan Zürcher (ed.). Fighting for a Living: A Comparative Study of Military Labour 1500-2000. Amsterdam University Press. pp. 115–134. ISBN 9789048517251. JSTOR j.ctt6wp6pg.7.
- Walker, Juliet E.K. (1986). "Racism, Slavery, and Free Enterprise: Black Entrepreneurship in the United States before the Civil War". The Business History Review. 60 (3): 343–382. doi:10.2307/3115882. JSTOR 3115882.
- Waterson, Roxana (2009). Paths and Rivers: Sa'dan Toraja Society in Transformation. Leiden: Brill. ISBN 9789067183079. JSTOR 10.1163/j.ctt1w76vcg.13.
- Watson, Alan (1983). "Roman Slave Law and Romanist Ideology". Phoenix. 37 (1): 53–65. doi:10.2307/1087314. JSTOR 1087314.
- Weaver, P.R.C. (1964). "Vicarius and Vicarianus in the Familia Caesaris". The Journal of Roman Studies. 54 (1 and 2): 117–128. doi:10.2307/298657. JSTOR 298657.
- Weaver, P.R.C. (1967). "Social Mobility in the Early Roman Empire: The Evidence of the Imperial Freedmen and Slaves". Past & Present (37): 3–20. doi:10.1093/past/37.1.3. JSTOR 650020.
- Wettinger, Godfrey (1959). "Coron captives in Malta: an episode in the history of slave-dealing" (PDF). Melita Historica. 2 (4): 216–223. Archived from the original on 28 October 2020.
- Wiens, Herold J. (1961). "Review: The Slaves of the Cool Mountains by Alan Winnington". Pacific Affairs. 34 (4): 399–402. doi:10.2307/2752639. JSTOR 2752639.
- Wiens, Herold J. (1962). "Some of China's Thirty-Five Million Non-Chinese". Journal of the Hong Kong Branch of the Royal Asiatic Society. 2: 54–74. JSTOR 23881255.
- Wilbur, Clarence Martin (1943). "Slavery in China During the Former Han Dynasty, 206 B.C.-A.D. 25". Publications of the Field Museum of Natural History. Anthropological Series. Publication. Field Museum of Natural History. 34. Chicago: Field Museum of Natural History. doi:10.5962/bhl.title.7168. JSTOR 29782260. OCLC 615419001.
- Wink, André (1997). "The Slave Household of Delhi". Al-Hind: The Making of the Indo-Islamic World. Vol. II: The Slave Kings and the Islamic Conquest, 11th-13th Centuries. London, New York, Köln: Brill. pp. 150–161. ISBN 9004102361.
- Wittek, Paul (1955). "Devshirme and sharī'a". Bulletin of the School of Oriental and African Studies, University of London. 17 (2): 271–278. doi:10.1017/S0041977X00111735. JSTOR 610423.
- Winnington, Alan (2008) [First published 1959]. The Slaves of the Cool Mountains. London: Serif. ISBN 978-1-897959-58-9.
- Yates, Robin D.S. (2017). "Slavery in Early China: A Socio-Cultural Approach". In Damian Alan Pargas; Felicia Roşu (eds.). Critical Readings on Global Slavery. Leiden: Brill. pp. 504–552. doi:10.1163/9789004346611_020. ISBN 978-90-04-34661-1.
- Yilmaz, Gülay (2015). "The Devshirme System and the Levied Children of Bursa in 1603-4". Belletin (Quarterly Bulletin of the Turkish Historical Institute). LXXIX (286). ISSN 0041-4255.
- Yosef, K. (2012). "Mamluks and their Relatives in the Period of the Mamluk Sultanate (1250-1517)". Mamlūk Studies Review. 16: 55–69.
- Yosef, Koby (2013). "The Term Mamlūk and Slave Status during the Mamluk Sultanate". Al-Qantara. XXXIV (1): 7–34. doi:10.3989/alqantara.2013.001. ISSN 0211-3589.
- Ze'evi, Dror; Buke, Ilkim (2015). "Banishment, Confiscation, and the Instability of the Ottoman Elite Household". In Dror Ze'evi; Ehud R. Toledano (eds.). Society, Law, and Culture in the Middle East: "Modernities" in the Making. Warsaw: De Gruyter. pp. 16–30. doi:10.1515/9783110439755-003. ISBN 978-3-11-043974-8.
- Zilfi, Madeline C. (2020). "Review: The Chief Eunuch of the Ottoman Harem: From African Slave to Power-Broker by Jane Hathaway". Journal of the American Oriental Society. 140 (4): 1009–1011. JSTOR 10.7817/jameroriesoci.140.4.1009.
- Zwalve, Willem J. (2002). "Callistus's Case: Some Legal Aspects of Roman Business Activities". In Lukas de Blois; John Rich (eds.). The Transformation of Economic Life under the Roman Empire. Brill. pp. 116–127. doi:10.1163/9789004401624_011. ISBN 978-90-04-40162-4. JSTOR 10.1163/j.ctv2gjwvt0.12.
