= Mansion House, London =

Official residence of the Lord Mayor of London

Coordinates: 51°30′47.7″N 0°5′21.7″W

Mansion House
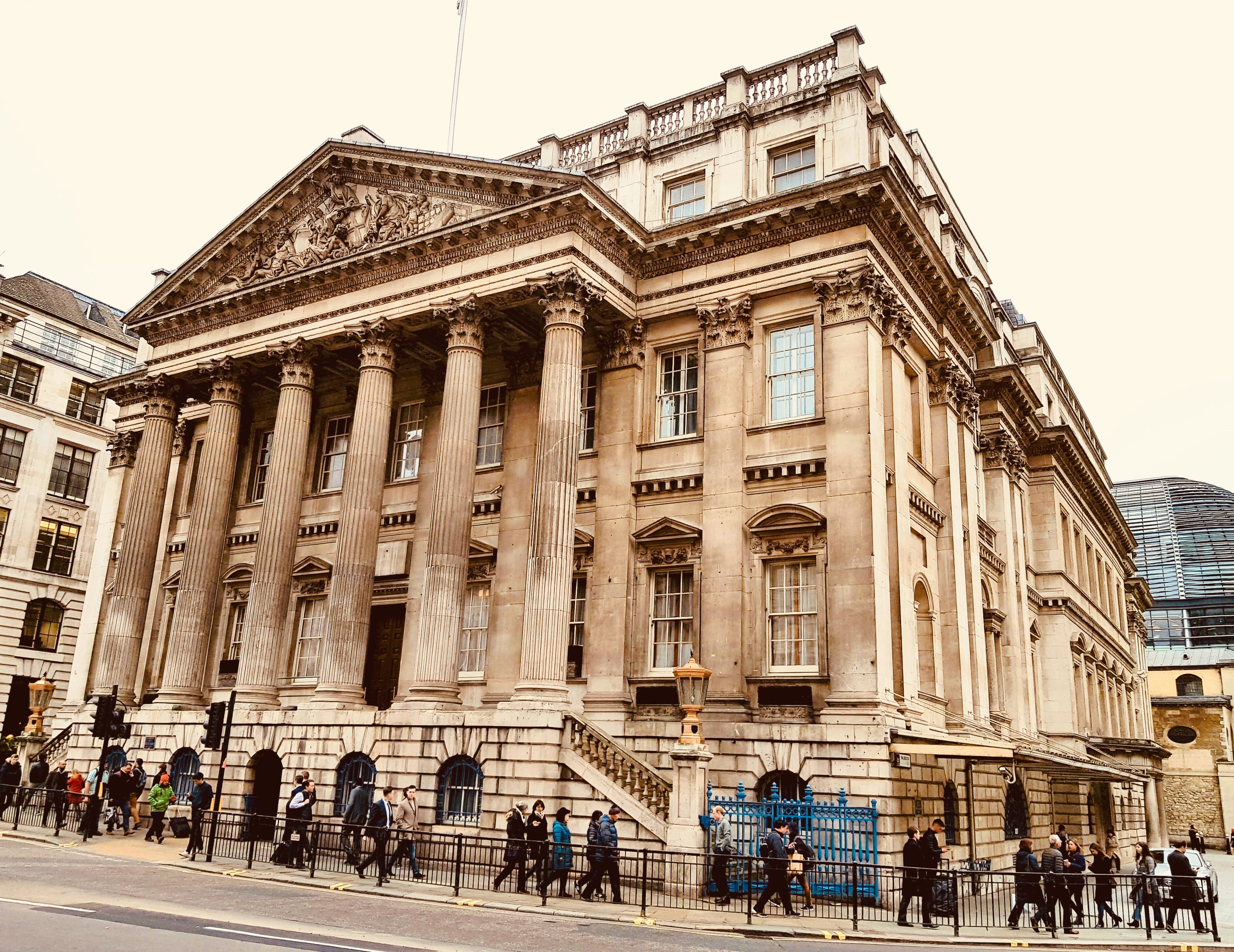
- Interactive map of the Mansion House area

General information
- Architectural style: Palladian
- Location: London, EC4, United Kingdom
- Current tenants: Lord Mayor of London
- Construction started: 1739

Design and construction
- Architect: George Dance the Elder

Website
- Mansion House

The Mansion House is the official residence of the Lord Mayor of London. It is a Grade I listed building. Designed by George Dance in the Palladian style, it was built primarily in the 1740s.

The Mansion House is used for some of the City of London's most formal official functions, including two annual white tie dinners. At the Easter banquet, the main speaker is the Foreign Secretary, who then receives a reply from the Dean of the Diplomatic Corps, i.e., the longest-serving ambassador. In early June, it is the turn of the Chancellor of the Exchequer to give their "Mansion House Speech" about the state of the British economy. The most famous was the Mansion House Speech of 1911 by David Lloyd George, which warned the German Empire against opposing British influence during the period leading up to the First World War.

== History ==
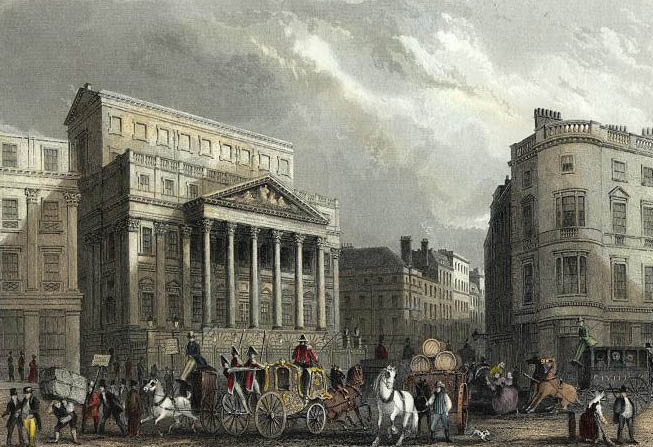
An 1837 view showing one of the two high attics. They were nicknamed the "Mayor's Nest" and "Noah's Ark".

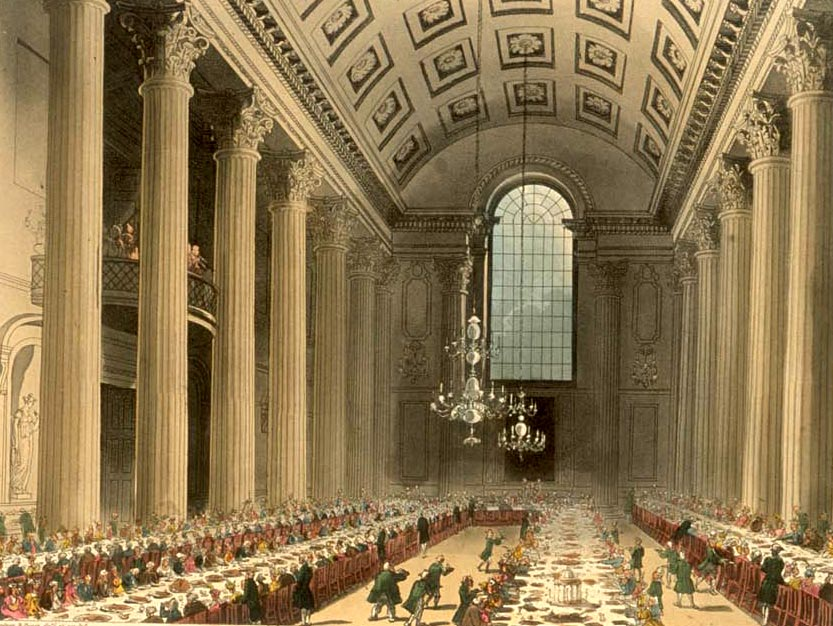
An early 19th-century banquet in the Egyptian Hall at the Mansion House (its size is exaggerated – see photo below)

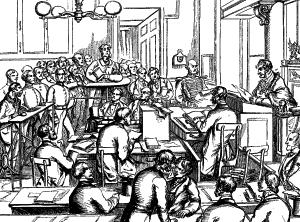
A public session at the Mansion House, circa 1840

The Mansion House was built between 1739 and 1752, in the Palladian style, by the surveyor and architect George Dance the Elder. The Master Mason was John Deval.

The site, at the east end of Poultry, London, had previously been occupied by the Stocks Market, which by the time of its closure was mostly used for the sale of herbs. The construction was prompted by a wish to put an end to the inconvenient practice of lodging the Lord Mayor in one of the City livery company halls. Dance won a competition over designs solicited from James Gibbs and Giacomo Leoni, and uninvited submissions by Batty Langley and Isaac Ware. Construction was slowed down by the discovery of springs on the site, which meant piles had to be sunk to lay adequate foundations.

The original building had two clerestory roof extensions, nicknamed the "Mayor's Nest" (a pun on "mare's nest") and "Noah's Ark". In 1795 George Dance the Younger re-roofed the central courtyard, and had the "Noah's Ark" demolished. In the same year, the original grand staircase was removed to make way for a further two rooms. In 1835 the entrance steps were reduced to one flight, and in 1842 the "Mayor's Nest" was demolished after the ballroom was reconstructed. The Lord Mayor's private entrance in Walbrook was created in 1845, and in 1849 the former Swordbearer's Room was converted into the Justice Room, effectively the magistrates' court of the City, until 1999 when the court removed to a building on the opposite side of Walbrook.

From 1873, with the Lord Mayor as its president, committee meetings of the Metropolitan Hospital Sunday Fund met at the Mansion House.

== Funding ==
The Mansion House was paid for in an unusual way: the City authorities, all Church of England men, found a way to tax those of other Christian denominations, particularly the Rational Dissenters. A Unitarian named Samuel Sharpe, banker by day and amateur Egyptologist by night, wrote about it in the 1830s, striking a blow against the Test and Corporate Acts. The article was republished in 1872. Sharpe argues that the Mansion House "remains as a monument of the unjust manner in which Dissenters were treated in the last century" (i.e. the 18th, in contrast to his own 19th, century). William Edward Hartpole Lecky in his History of England during the Eighteenth Century (1878) describes the funding of the construction of the Mansion House as "a very scandalous form of persecution".

There are over one hundred livery companies, the senior members of which form a special electorate known as Common Hall. In 1748 the City of London Corporation devised a Catch-22 situation to raise money, passing a by-law levying a heavy fine on any man who refused to stand for election, or who, once elected to office, refused to serve. In order to serve as a Sheriff of the City of London, the individual had to have "taken the sacrament according to the Anglican rite" within the past year. This was exactly what English Dissenters could not, in conscience, do:

"It would appear almost incredible, if the facts were not widely attested, that under these circumstances the City of London systematically elected wealthy Dissenters to the office in order that they should be objected to and fined, and that in this manner it extorted no less than £15,000. The electors appointed these Dissenters with a clear knowledge that they would not serve, and with the sole purpose of extorting money. One of those whom they selected was blind; another was bedridden."

Some tried to appeal, but the process was immensely risky and costly, with the City holding all the cards. Eventually a man named Evans began a challenge which lasted ten years; in 1767, the House of Lords, drawing on the Toleration Act 1688, agreed with Lord Mansfield and ruled to curtail the City's abuse of power. In order to avoid civil disabilities such as this financially ruinous persecution, some Dissenters were known to take Communion in their parish church once a year; in the phraseology of the time, "occasional conformity" (see Occasional Conformity Act 1711). Thomas Abney rose to be Lord Mayor in this fashion.

The American author Mark Twain recounts the story in A Connecticut Yankee in King Arthur's Court (1889):

It reminded me of something I had read in my youth about the ingenious way in which the aldermen of London raised the money that built the Mansion House. A person who had not taken the Sacrament according to the Anglican rite could not stand as a candidate for sheriff of London. Thus Dissenters were ineligible; they could not run if asked, they could not serve if elected. The aldermen, who without any question were Yankees in disguise, hit upon this neat device: they passed a by-law imposing a fine of £400 upon any one who should refuse to be a candidate for sheriff, and a fine of £600 upon any person who, after being elected sheriff, refused to serve. Then they went to work and elected a lot of Dissenters, one after another, and kept it up until they had collected £15,000 in fines; and there stands the stately Mansion House to this day, to keep the blushing citizen in mind of a long past and lamented day when a band of Yankees slipped into London and played games of the sort that has given their race a unique and shady reputation among all truly good and holy peoples that be in the earth.

== Architecture ==
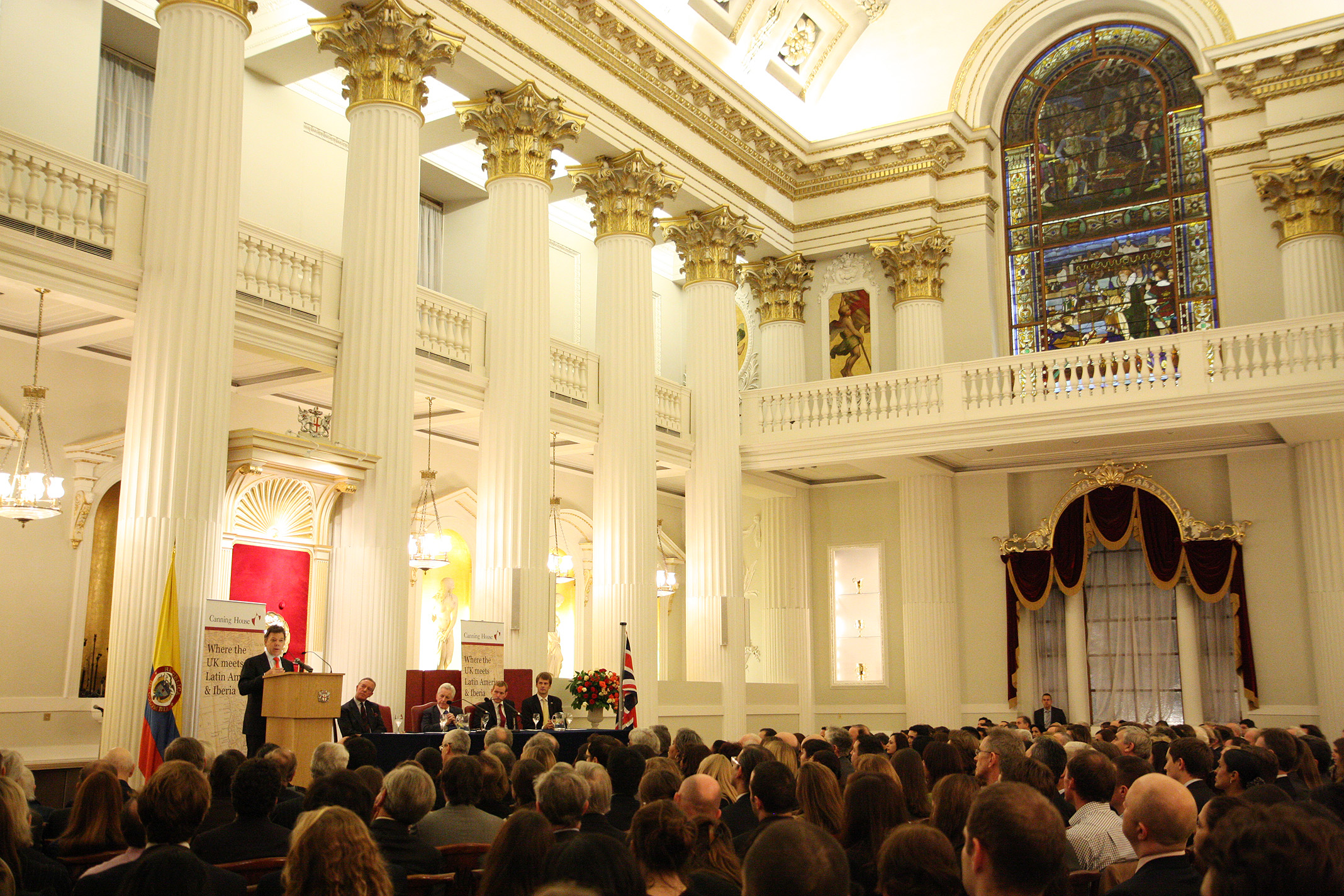
The Egyptian Hall in 2011

The Mansion House has three main storeys over a rusticated basement. The entrance facade has a portico with six Corinthian columns, supporting a pediment with a tympanum sculpture by Sir Robert Taylor, in the centre of which is a symbolic figure of the City of London trampling on her enemies. The building originally had two prominent and unusual attic structures at either end, which were removed in 1794 and 1843. The building is on a confined site. Sir John Summerson wrote that "it leaves an impression of uneasily constricted bulk", adding that "on the whole, the building is a striking reminder that good taste was not a universal attribute in the eighteenth century". The main reception room, the columned "Egyptian Hall", was so named because Dance used an arrangement of columns deemed to be "Egyptian" by Vitruvius. No Egyptian motifs were employed. It has twenty niches for sculpture. There was originally an open courtyard, later occupied by a saloon.

The residence used to have its own court of law, since the Lord Mayor is the chief magistrate of the City while in office. There were eleven holding cells (ten for men and one, nicknamed "the birdcage", for women). A famous prisoner here was the early 20th-century suffragette women's rights campaigner Sylvia Pankhurst.

== Art collection ==
The Mansion House is home to the Harold Samuel Collection of Dutch and Flemish Seventeenth Century Paintings, described as "the finest collection of such works to be formed in Britain this century". It consists of 84 paintings and includes some outstanding works by artists including Hendrick Avercamp, Gerard Ter Borch, Pieter Claesz, Aelbert Cuyp, Frans Hals, Pieter de Hooch, Jacob van Ruisdael, Jan Steen, David Teniers the Younger and Willem van de Velde. The Mansion House also houses a plate collection, which includes among other treasures, the five ceremonial City of London swords.

== Public access ==
The Mansion House is not generally open to the public. However, tours can be arranged through the diary office, and there are public tours most Tuesdays.

== Mansion House Street ==
Mansion House Street is the short street at the front of the Mansion House, which connects Poultry, Queen Victoria Street and Bank Junction above Bank Underground station.

== Other ==
Guildhall is another venue used for important City functions.
