= Old Jewry =

Street in the City of London, England

Coordinates: 51.5143°N 0.0909°W

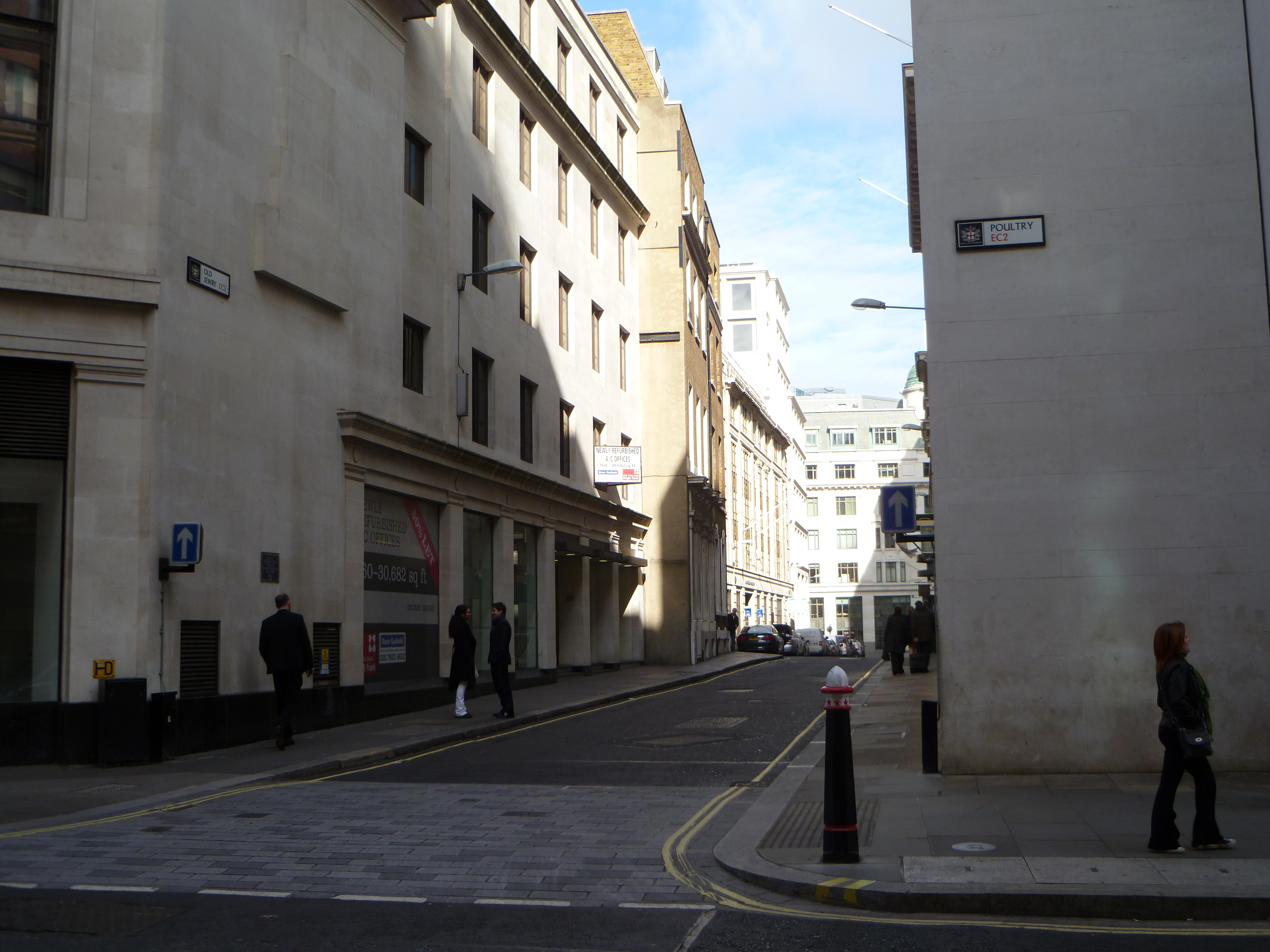
- The southern end of Old Jewry at its junction with Poultry
- Interactive map of Old Jewry
- Length: 145 m (476 ft)
- Location: London, United Kingdom
- Postal code: EC2
- Nearest train station: Bank
- South end: Poultry
- To: Gresham Street

Other
- Known for: Location of medieval Jewish community

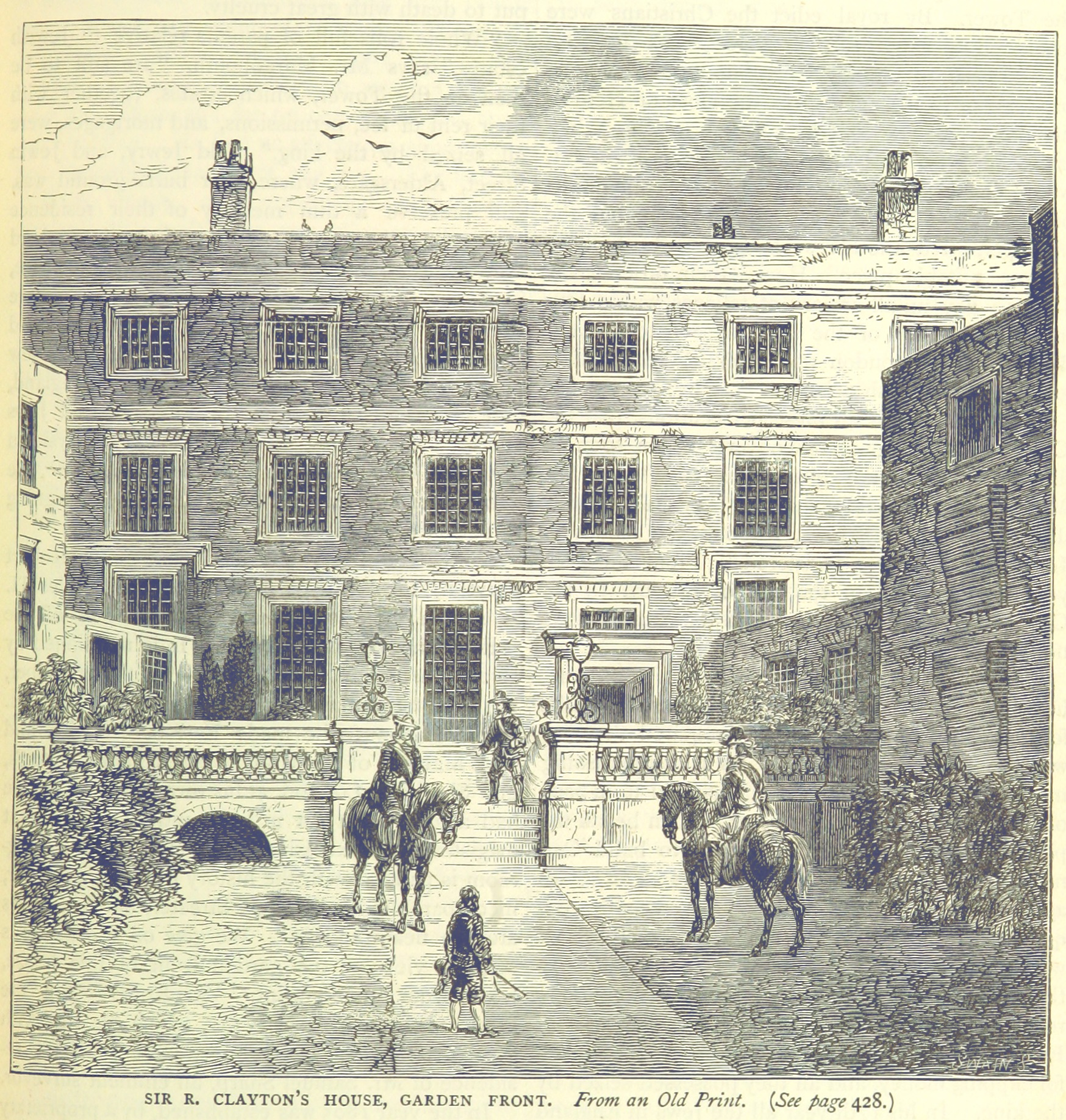
Garden front of Sir Robert Clayton's house at No 8 Old Jewry in the time of Charles II

Old Jewry is a one-way street in the City of London, the historic and financial centre of London. It is located within Coleman Street ward and links Poultry to Gresham Street.

The street now contains mainly offices for financial companies. The nearest London Underground station is Bank and the closest mainline railway station is Cannon Street.

== Early history ==
Soon after the Norman Conquest, William the Conqueror encouraged Jews to come to England. Some settled in cities throughout his new domain, including in London. According to Reverend Moses Margoliouth, Old Jewry was a ghetto. Ghettos, areas of a city mainly or exclusively populated by Jews, were common across Europe. In 2001, archaeologists discovered a mikveh (ritual bath) near to Old Jewry, on the corner of Gresham Street and Milk Street, under what is now the State Bank of India. It would have fallen into disuse after 1290, when the Jews were expelled from England.

On the west side of Old Jewry is St Olave Old Jewry; only the tower of this church survives. When it was destroyed in 1887, a Roman pavement and vases were discovered. Jewen Street, not far away, off Aldersgate, still existed in 1722. According to Ephraim Chambers' Cyclopaedia, this was the only permitted burial ground for Jews. Also nearby is St Lawrence Jewry, a Church of England guild church on Gresham Street, next to the Guildhall.

Thomas Rowlandson was born on Old Jewry in 1756.

For many years, the headquarters of the City of London Police was in Old Jewry.

== Meeting-house ==
There was a Dissenting chapel in Old Jewry in the 1700s. Richard Price, minister of Newington Green Chapel, was also the afternoon preacher here from 1763. Joseph Fawcett spoke there from 1785, when he began a series of Sunday evening lectures which drew "the largest and most genteel London audience that ever assembled in a dissenting place of worship".

== See also ==
- Bank Junction
- Cheapside
- Ironmonger Lane
- Lothbury
