= Equestrian statue of the Duke of Wellington, City of London =

Statue by Francis Leggatt Chantrey

Equestrian statue of the Duke of Wellington
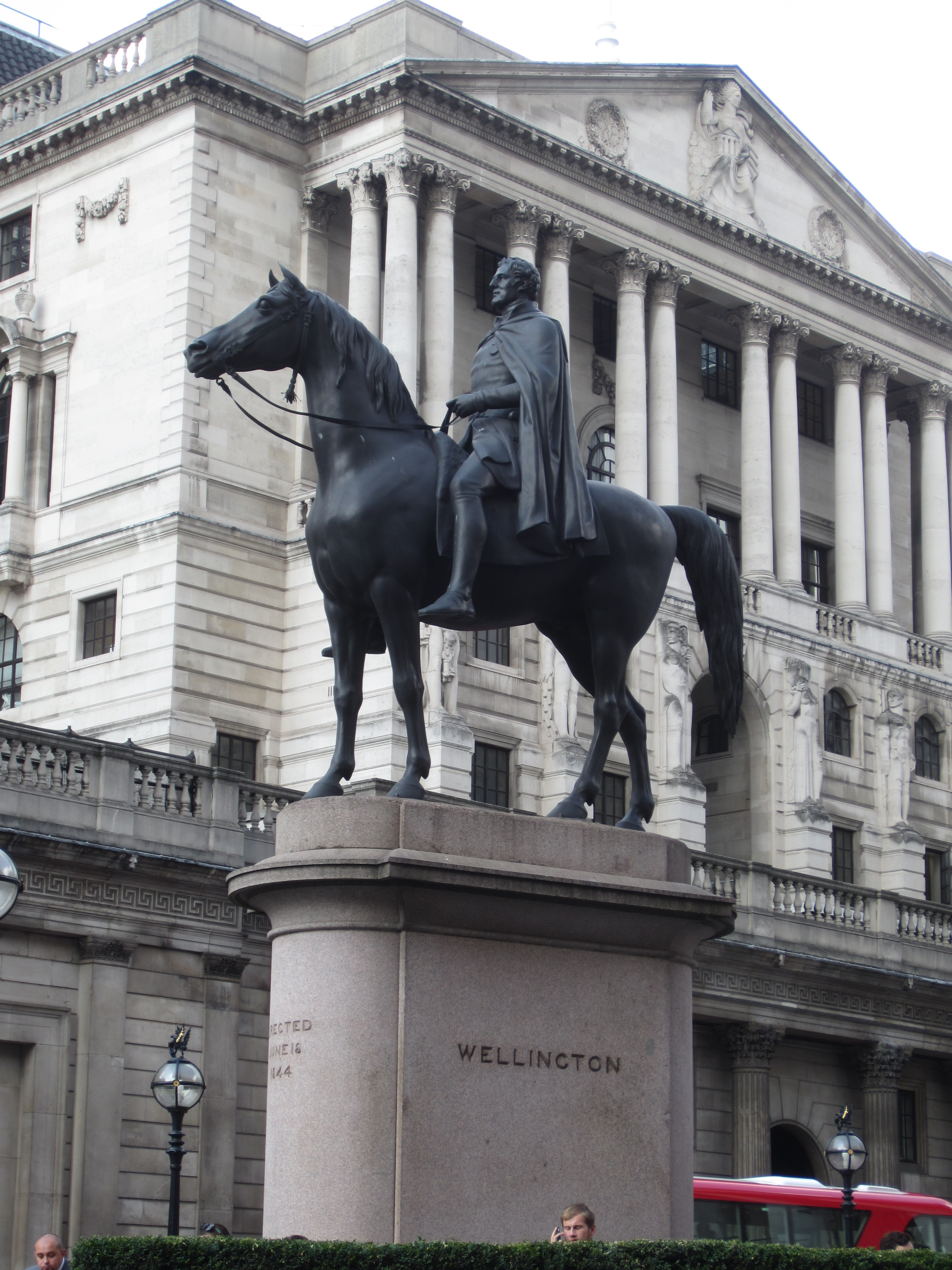
- The statue in 2014
- Artist: Francis Leggatt Chantrey
- Year: 18 June 1844
- Medium: Bronze
- Subject: Arthur Wellesley, 1st Duke of Wellington
- Location: London; 51.513494°N 0.0884121°W

The equestrian statue of the Duke of Wellington is an outdoor sculpture of Arthur Wellesley, 1st Duke of Wellington, a British soldier and statesman, located at the Royal Exchange in London. It overlooks Bank junction in the historic City of London. The sculptor was Francis Leggatt Chantrey. The statue commemorates Wellington's assistance to the City of London in ensuring that a bill was passed to allow the rebuilding of London Bridge.

The base of the statue is a ventilation shaft for Bank and Monument stations on the London Underground. It was converted during expansion of Bank station in 1994.

== History ==
While sitting for a later portrait by Charles Robert Leslie, Wellington recalled that Chantrey had told him he had a square head. After Chantrey's sudden death his studio assistant Henry Weekes completed the sculpture.

Wellington attended the unveiling of his statue on 18 June 1844. The date was chosen to commemorate the Battle of Waterloo, where Wellington led an allied army to victory against Napoleon, in 1815. Frederick Augustus II, King of Saxony, who was in London visiting Queen Victoria, also attended the unveiling.

== Description ==
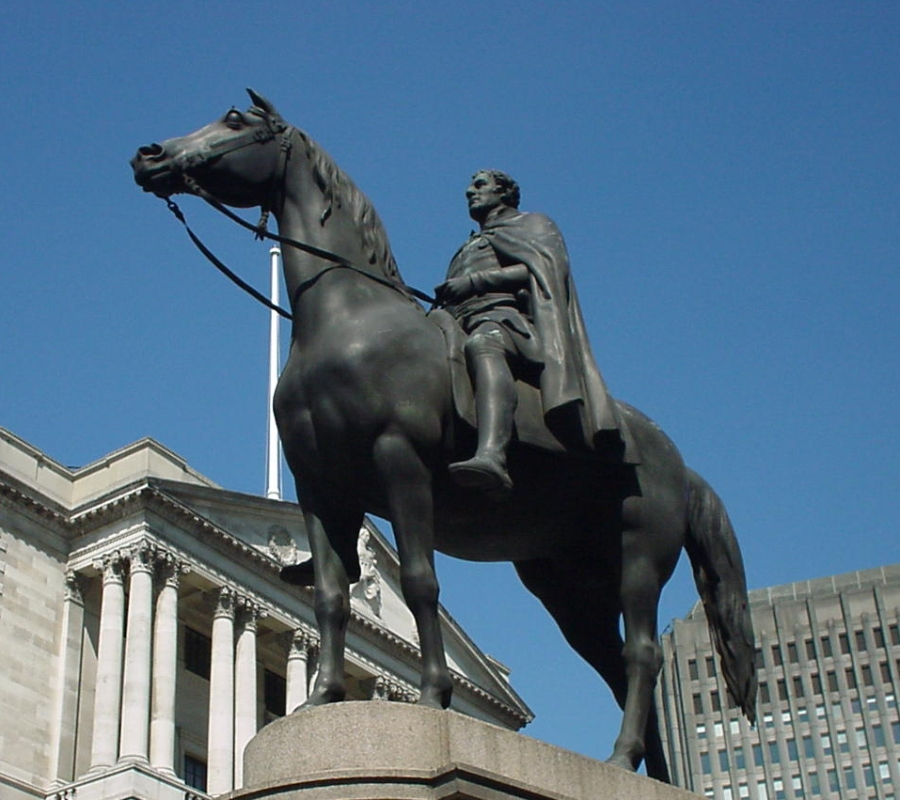
Close-up of the statue in 2004

The equestrian statue was erected to show the city's gratitude for Wellington's help in assisting the passage of the London Bridge Approaches Act 1827. This Act led to the creation of King William Street.

"Wellington" is inscribed on each side of the plinth; on its ends is the inscription "Erected June 18, 1844". A brass plaque at the plinth's base reads:

On 19th July 1838 the Court of Common Council of the City of London agreed to a contribution of £500 toward the cost of the above statue of the Duke of Wellington in appreciation of his efforts in assisting the passage of the London Bridge Approaches Act 1827. This Act led to the creation of King William Street. The government donated the metal, which is bronze from captured enemy cannon melted down after the Battle of Waterloo, and valued at the time at £1500. The total cost of the statue was £9000. The remainder being raised by public subscription.

The sculptor, Sir Francis Chantrey (1781 to 1841), was commissioned in 1838 but died before the work was completed. It was finished by his assistant Henry Weekes (1807 to 1877).
The Lord Mayor, William Magnay, unveiled the statue on 18th June 1844, the anniversary of Waterloo, in the presence of his guest the King of Saxony.

Adjoining the statue, a piece of granite from London Bridge (1825 to 1967) has been set into the pavement by the Corporation of London. The elevational stonework from the same bridge was re-erected over the Colorado River in Lake Havasu City, Arizona, USA, in 1971.
