= Worshipful Company of Grocers =

Livery Company of the City of London

Coordinates: 51°30′51″N 0°5′23″W

Grocers' Company
- Grocers' shield: Argent a Chevron Gules between nine Cloves six in chief and three in base Proper.
- Motto: God Grant Grace
- Location: Grocers' Hall, Princes Street, London EC2
- Date of formation: 1345; 681 years ago
- Company association: Spice merchants
- Order of precedence: 2nd
- Master of company: Edward Campbell-Johnston
- Website: www.grocershall.co.uk

The Worshipful Company of Grocers is one of the 114 livery companies of the City of London. Established in 1345 for wholesalers who dealt in "grosses", it is one of the Great Twelve City Livery Companies, ranking second in the order of precedence after the Mercers. The Company's motto is "God Grant Grace".

The Grocers' Company continues as a charitable, constitutional and ceremonial institution which plays a significant role in the election of and supporting the Lord Mayor and the Sheriffs of the City of London.

The Company provides banqueting and conference facilities at Grocers' Hall situated in Prince's Street, next to the Bank of England.

== Origins and early history ==
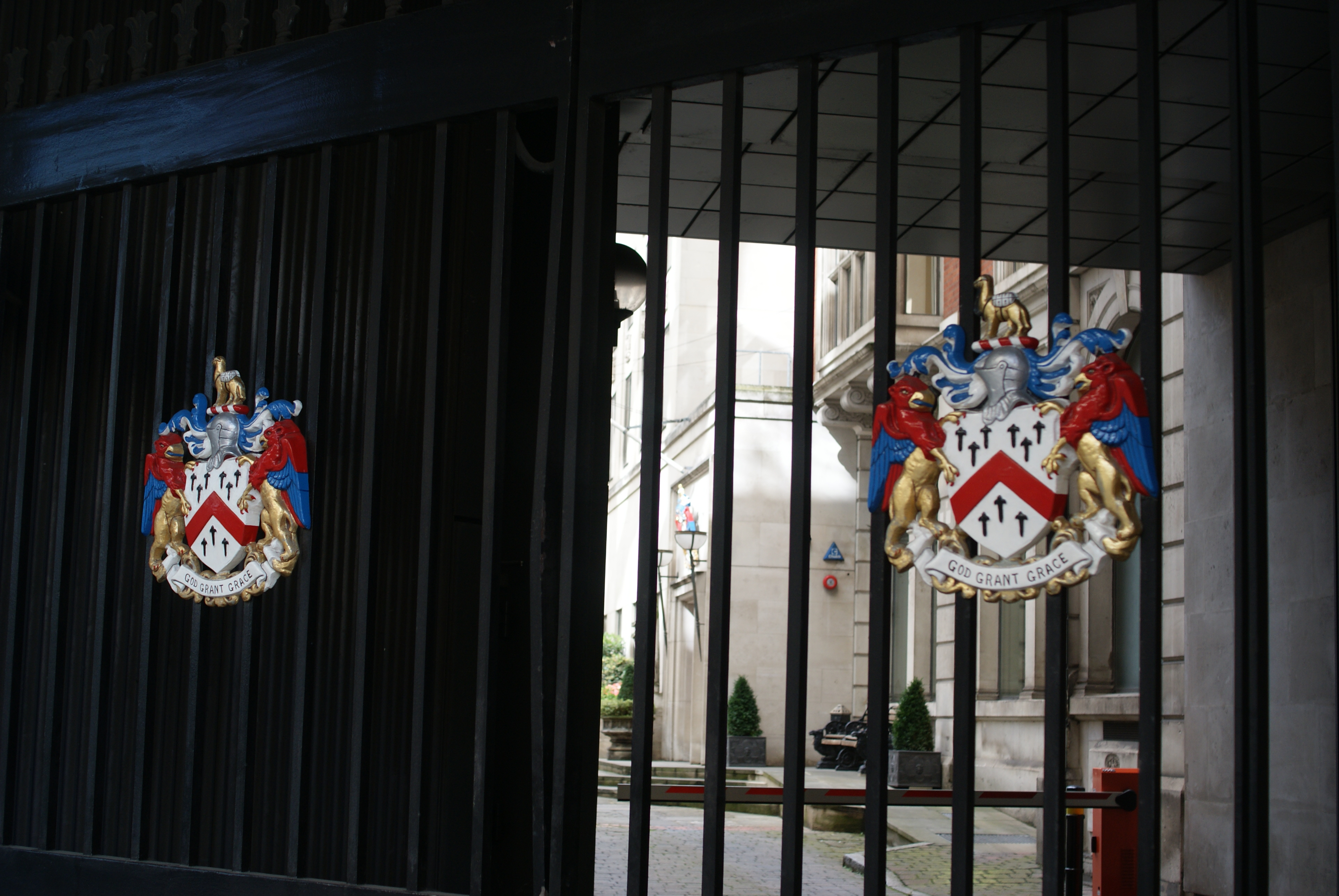
Armorial bearings of the Worshipful Company of Grocers at Grocers' Hall

Founded in 1345 by a merger of the Guild of Pepperers, dating from 1180, with the Spicers. The Company was responsible for maintaining standards for the purity of spices and for setting of certain weights and measures. Its membership until 1617 included suppliers of medicinal spices and herbs when the Worshipful Society of Apothecaries was formed.

The guild was first known as the Fraternity of St Anthony, then from 1373 as the Company of Grossers, until 1376 when it was renamed the Company of Grocers of London. In 1428, two years after building its first hall in Old Jewry, the Company was granted a Royal Charter by King Henry VI of England.

The term "grocer" originally had a meaning different from the current customary usage. It referred to a retailer who "traded in gross quantities" and, therefore, encompassed a wide variety of merchants. This included manufacturers and purveyors of mathematical instruments. The Worshipful Company of Grocers, more colloquially known as the Grocers' Company, is one of the Great Twelve Livery Companies of London.

== Grocers' Hall ==
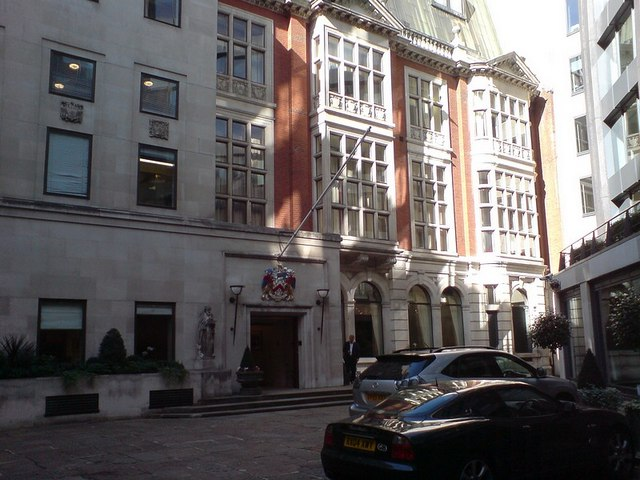
The fifth and current Grocers' Hall on Prince's Street, London EC2

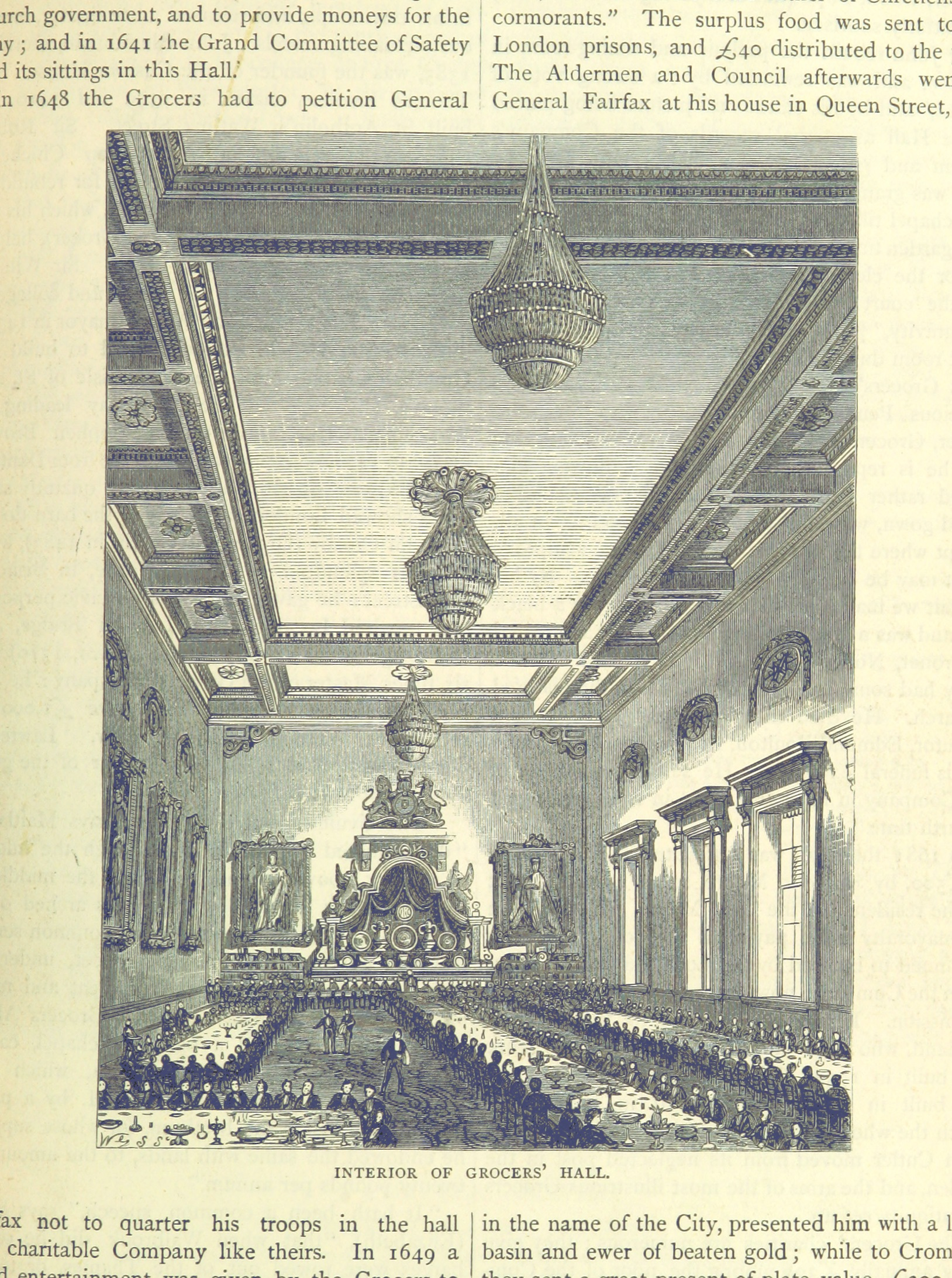
The interior of Grocers' Hall, 1887

The earliest known Grocers' Hall was in Poultry, London, then known as Conningshop-Lane on account of the three conies or rabbits hanging over a poulterer's stall in the lane. It was built in 1428 on land once owned by Lord FitzWalter and let out "for dinners, funerals, county feasts and weddings".

The roof and woodwork of the Hall were destroyed in the 1666 Great Fire and afterwards a new roof was erected on the old walls while Sir John Cutler paid for a new parlour and dining room. The Hall was again renovated in 1681 by the future Lord Mayor Sir John Moore. A new Hall was built on the same site between 1798 and 1802 when part of the garden was sold to the Bank of England for the expansion of nearby Prince's Street. However, frequent and extensive repairs were required due to the third Hall's defective foundations, which was replaced by a fourth Hall, completed in 1893 on Prince's Street.

The Hall survived the Blitz with only minor damage to its north wing, but was almost completely destroyed by fire in 1965, apparently caused by a lightbulb left on in the grand staircase beneath an oak lintel which smouldered and eventually ignited. The fifth and final Hall was constructed nearby in 1970, also on Prince's Street, remaining the Grocers' home today.

== Symbols ==
The Ancient Guild of Pepperers chose a camel as its symbol due to pepper originally coming over land rather than sea. The camel is incorporated as the crest of the company's heraldic achievement which also includes two griffins holding the escutcheon (shield) on which is displayed the coat of arms: "Argent a Chevron Gules between nine Cloves six in chief and three in base Proper".

== Company masters ==
Past Masters of the Grocers' Company include Lord Mayors Sir Robert Leigh, Sir Robert Ladbroke, Sir Samuel Garrard and Sir Charles Bowman, the Immediate Past Master. Other Past Masters Grocer are Admiral Nicholas Goodhart and Timothy Coleridge, son of former Lloyd's chairman David Coleridge and brother of Sir Nicholas Coleridge.

The Master Grocer for 2025/2026 is Edward Campbell-Johnston. The Clerk to the Grocers' Company is Brigadier Greville Bibby.

== Affiliations: Churches, schools, military ==
St Mary-Le-Bow is the guild church for the company.

The Church of St Paul, Homerton, in Hackney was founded by the Company in 1890, but declared redundant in 1981: its edifice still displays the Grocers' arms. St Paul's then united with St Barnabas' Church, Homerton. The Grocers' Company retains joint patronage of the advowson (right to nominate appointees to the church benefice) with the Bishop of London and the Trustees of All Souls, Clapton Common.

The Church of St Mary the Virgin, Northill, in Bedfordshire displays the Grocers' arms on a stained glass window by John Oliver, commissioned by the Company in 1664.

The Grocers' Company is responsible for the maintenance of Oundle School in Northamptonshire, which uses the Grocers' arms as its school badge. Other schools maintained by the Company are the Elms School in Colwall, Herefordshire as well as Reed's School whose Annual Foundation Appeal has been held at Grocers' Hall for over fifty years. In 1876 the Company founded the Grocers' Company School, Hackney in the East End of London for the education of "sons of the middle classes". It was transferred under London County Council's control after that authority's formation in 1889, changing its name to Hackney Downs School; it closed in 1995. Hackney Downs depicted as its school badge a camel, for the Lower School, and a shield with cloves and the motto of the Grocers' Company for the Upper School. The "Camel and Cloves" are remembered to this day by Old Boys through the Clove Club. The Grocers' Company maintains close links with and is the principal sponsor of Mossbourne Community Academy, which is on the Hackney Downs site.

The Northern Ireland village of Eglinton, County Londonderry was established by the Grocers' Company in 1619 under the name of Muff. The local credit union, a branch of Castle and Minster Credit Union (which ceased trading in 2015) assumed use of the Company's coat of arms, as has Eglinton Primary School.

The Grocers' Company is also affiliated with HMS Queen Elizabeth, the first of the Royal Navy's new Queen Elizabeth-class aircraft carriers, and with the Coldstream Guards, the oldest regular regiment of the British Army as well as XI (F) Squadron, Royal Air Force.

== See also ==
- Guilds in Medieval Europe
