= Queen Victoria Street, London =

Street in the City of London

Coordinates: 51°30′43″N 0°06′00″W

Queen Victoria Street
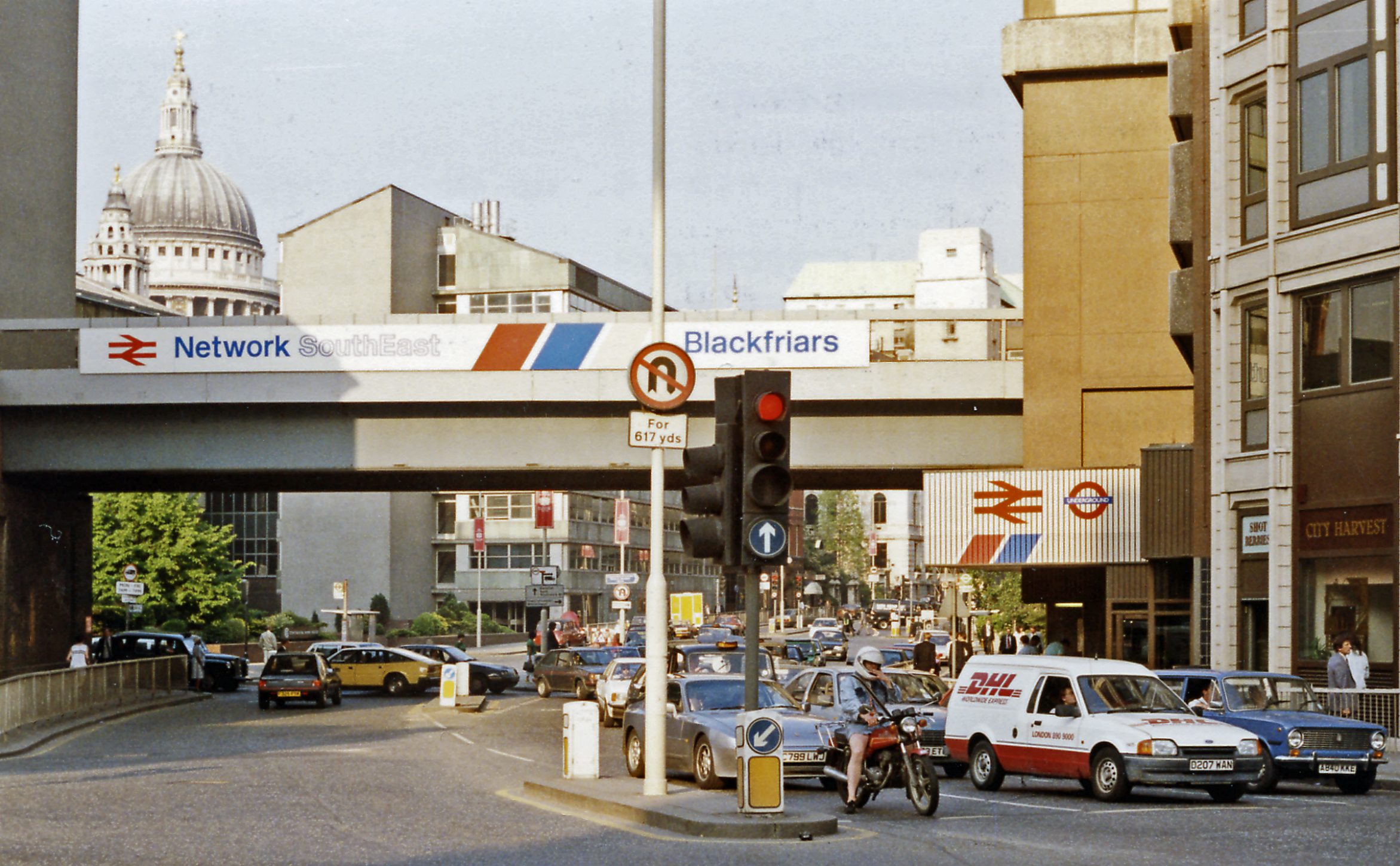
- Queen Victoria Street in 1989
- Interactive map of Queen Victoria Street
- Length: 0.7 mi (1.1 km)
- Location: London, United Kingdom
- Postal code: EC2
- Nearest train station: Blackfriars; Bank; Mansion House
- West end: New Bridge Street/Victoria Embankment
- East end: Mansion House Street/Bank Junction

Queen Victoria Street named in honour of the British monarch who reigned from 1837 to 1901, is a street in London that runs east by north from its junction with New Bridge Street and Victoria Embankment in the Castle Baynard ward of the City of London, along a section that divides the wards of Queenhithe and Bread Street, then lastly through the middle of Cordwainer ward, until it reaches Mansion House Street at Bank junction. Beyond Bank junction, the street continues north-east as Threadneedle Street which joins Bishopsgate. Other streets linked to Queen Victoria Street include Puddle Dock, Cannon Street, Walbrook and Poultry.

The road was commissioned in 1861 to streamline the approach to the central business district, and was provided for through the Metropolitan Improvement Act. Costing over £1,000,000, it remains a major street within the City. Its construction demolished New Pye Street, named after Sir Robert Pye.

The nearby London Underground stations are Blackfriars (at its western junction with New Bridge Street), Mansion House (where it crosses Cannon Street), and Bank (near its eastern end).

Queen Victoria Street formed part of the marathon course of the 2012 Olympic and Paralympic Games.

== Notable buildings ==
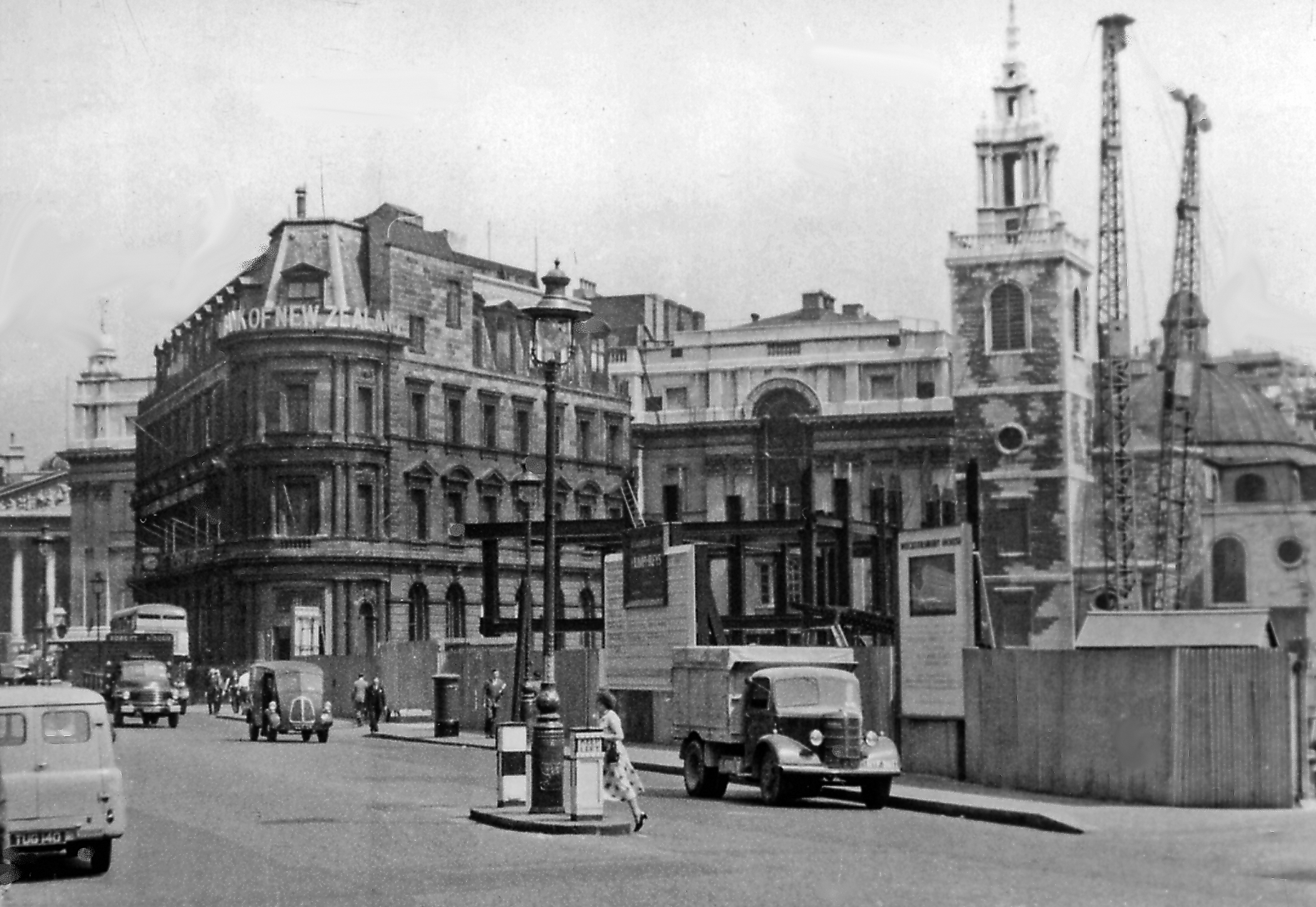
Queen Victoria Street's eastern end pictured in 1955. The church of St Stephen Walbrook (right) is undergoing repair after damage in the Blitz. The Bank of New Zealand's building at 1 Queen Victoria Street is centre left.

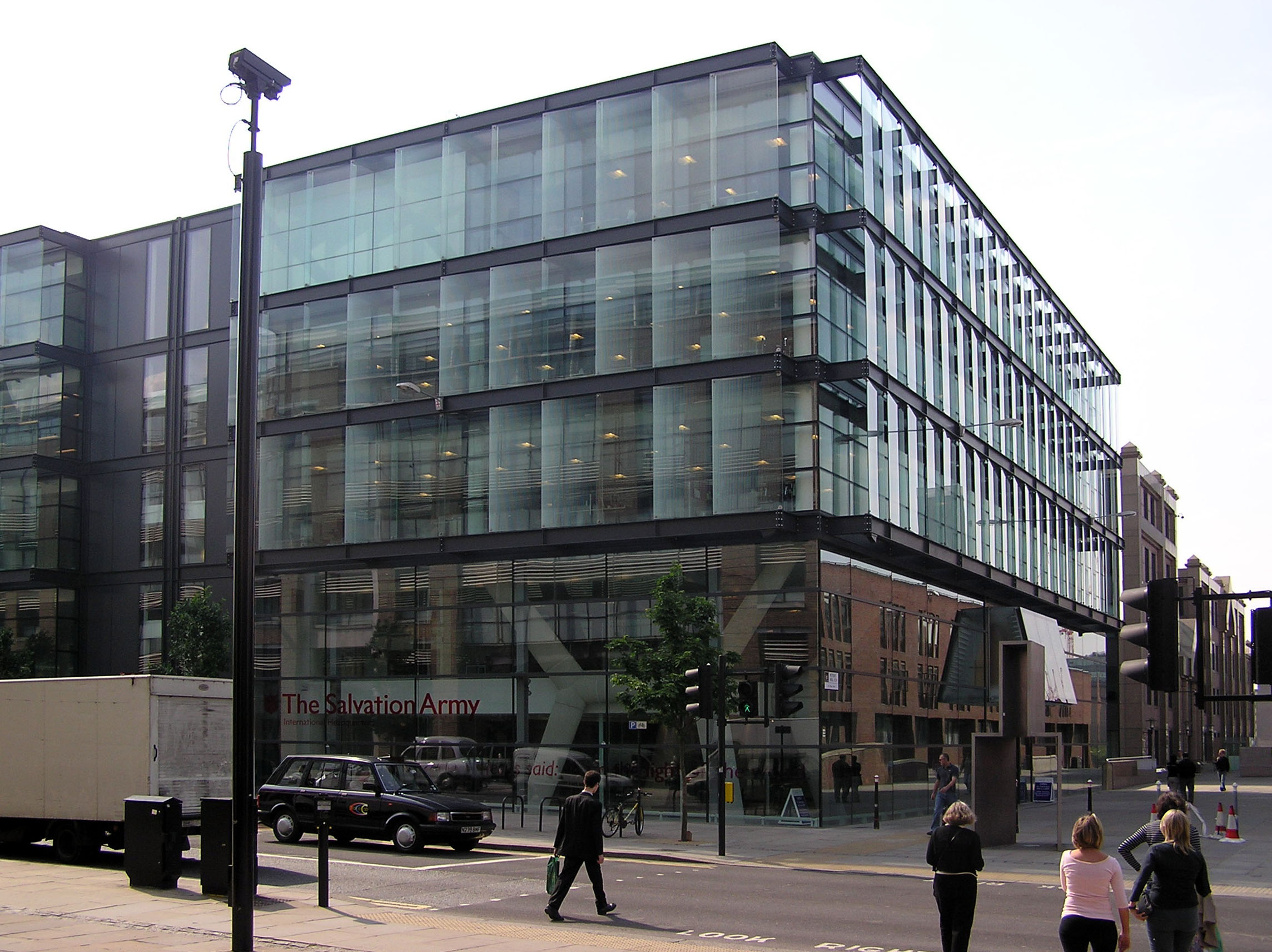
The Salvation Army's headquarters on Queen Victoria Street

- The Bank of New Zealand's triangular building at No. 1 was its London office from 1889 to 1988. It is now the offices of the City of London Magistrates' Court Committee.
- Bloomberg London at No. 3
- Albert Buildings at Nos. 39-53
- The Salvation Army's global headquarters at No. 101
- City of London School at No. 107
- A Monetary Authority of Singapore branch at No. 128
- The College of Arms' headquarters at No. 130
- Baynard House at No. 133
- St Benet Paul's Wharf church at No. 135
- The Faraday Building at No. 136-144. A blue plaque marks the previous site of the Doctors' Commons, demolished in 1867.
- The British and Foreign Bible Society was located at No. 146 between 1868 and 1985. The address is now occupied by the Church of Scientology of London.
- The church of St. Andrew-by-the-Wardrobe
- The Bank of New York Mellon at No. 160, formerly the site of The Times' newspaper offices
