= Gresham Street =

Street in the City of London

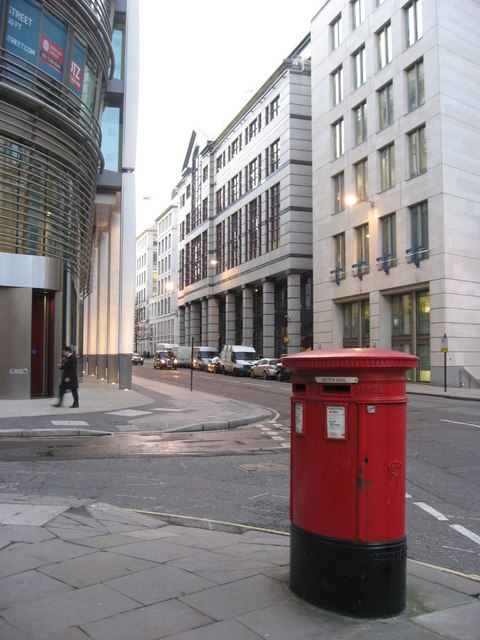
- At the junction of Gresham Street and Milk Street
- Interactive map of Gresham Street
- Length: 0.3 mi (0.48 km)
- Location: London, United Kingdom
- Postal code: EC2
- Nearest train station: St Paul's; Bank
- Coordinates: 51°30′55″N 00°05′35″W
- East end: Lothbury/Moorgate
- West end: St. Martin's Le Grand

Construction
- Inauguration: By 1896

Gresham Street /ɡrɛʃəm/ in the City of London is named after the English merchant and financier Thomas Gresham.

It runs from the junction of Lothbury, Old Jewry and Coleman Street at its eastern end, to St. Martin's Le Grand in the west. Gresham Street was created in 1845 by widening and amalgamating Cateaton Street, Maiden Lane, St. Anne's Lane and Lad Lane.

The nearest London Underground stations are St Paul's, which can be reached via St. Martin's Le Grand to the south from its western end, and Bank, via Lothbury and Princes Street, a short distance to the south from its eastern end.

== Overview ==
A famous coaching inn, The Swan With Two Necks, once stood on the former Lad Lane, at the junction of Gresham Street with Milk Street – one of the historic side-streets which leads off to the south towards Cheapside. Other ancient side-roads leading towards Cheapside are Foster Lane, Gutter Lane, Ironmonger Lane, and Old Jewry. Leading north off Gresham Street are Noble Street, Staining Lane, Aldermanbury, Basinghall Street and Coleman Street. Wood Street, home to the City of London Police headquarters, crosses Gresham Street and leads both north and south.

There is a memorial garden on the site of St. Mary Aldermanbury, a Christopher Wren church, that, following damage in the Blitz, was dismantled and rebuilt in Fulton, Missouri. Near the Guildhall—perhaps Gresham Street's most notable site—is the church of St. Lawrence Jewry, also by Wren.

Gresham Street is home to the Lloyds Banking Group's headquarters and also to Moody's, Investec, Alliance Trust and Rensburg Sheppards.

It formed part of the marathon course of the 2012 Olympic and Paralympic Games.

== See also ==
- List of eponymous roads in London
