= Bank Junction =

Road junction in the City of London

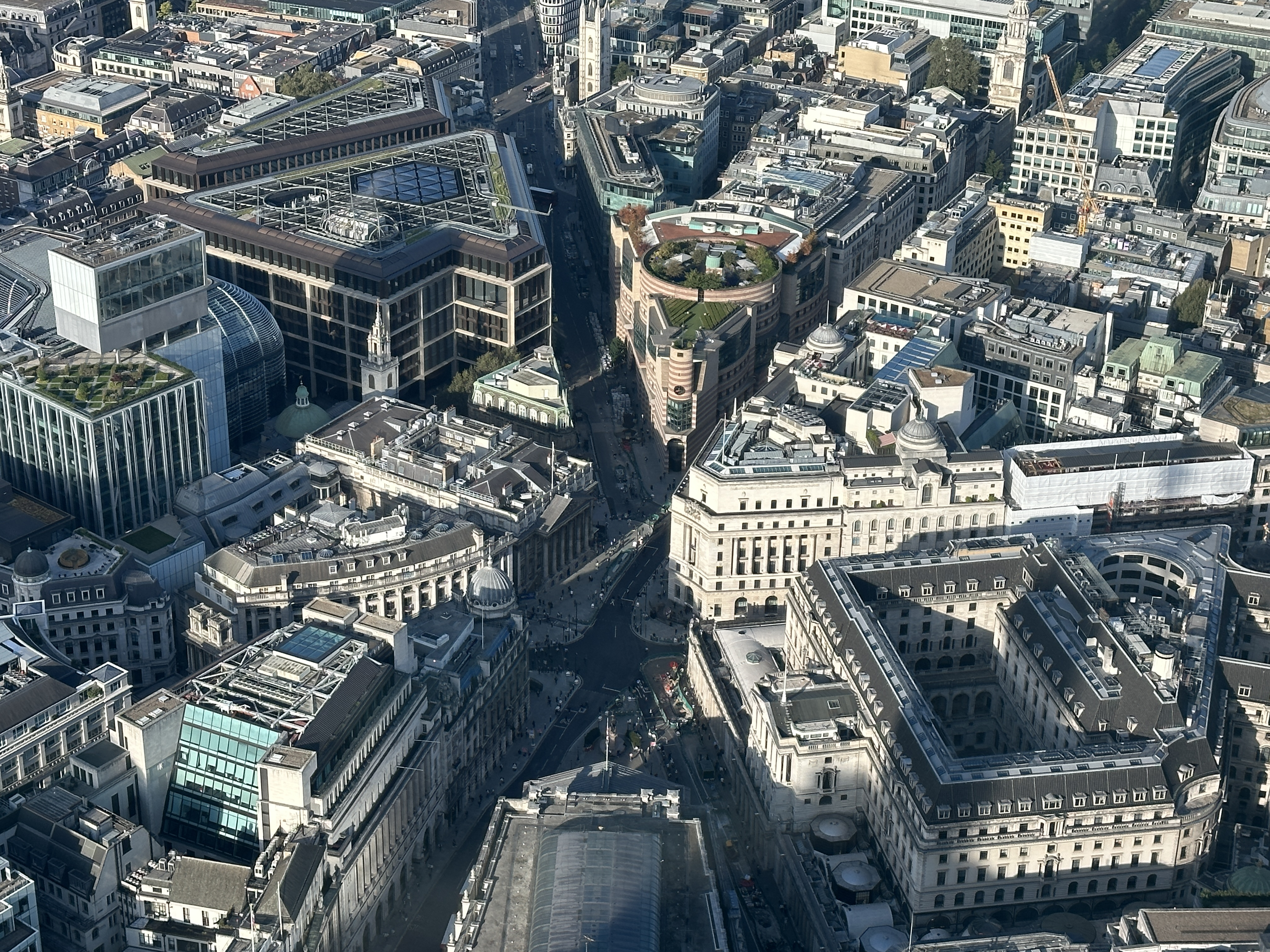
- Bank Junction in 2023, viewed from 22 Bishopsgate
- Interactive map of Bank Junction

Location
- City of London
- Coordinates: 51.513433°N 0.089045°W
- Roads at junction: Threadneedle Street, Cornhill, Lombard Street, King William Street, Mansion House Place, Walbrook, Mansion House Street, Queen Victoria Street, Poultry, Prince's Street

Construction
- Type: Junction
- Maintained by: City of London Corporation
- Tolls: Within the London congestion charge zone

Location of Bank Junction in the City of London

Bank Junction is a major road junction in the City of London, the historic and financial centre of London, at (or by) which nine streets converge and where traffic is controlled by traffic lights and give-way lines. It is named after the nearby Bank of England. Directly underneath it is one of the ticket halls of Bank station, one of the busiest stations on the London Underground.

== Street network ==
The streets which originate at Bank Junction are:

- Threadneedle Street (northeast, towards Bishopsgate)
- Cornhill (east, towards Leadenhall Street)
- Lombard Street (southeast, towards Gracechurch Street)
- Mansion House Place (south, runs to the east of Mansion House)
- Walbrook (south, towards Cannon Street)
- Queen Victoria Street (southwest, towards Blackfriars)
- Poultry (west, towards Cheapside)
- Mansion House Street (west, effectively part of the junction, leading to Poultry and Queen Victoria Street)
- Princes Street (northwest, towards Moorgate)

King William Street, a major thoroughfare, begins just south of the junction, leading off Lombard Street.

Since May 2017, the junction has been closed to all vehicles except buses and pedal cycles from 7am to 7pm, Monday to Friday, on an experimental basis.

== Notable sites ==
Standing on the northeast corner of this junction is the Bank of England, headquartered on Threadneedle Street since 1734 and thus sometimes known by the metonym The Old Lady of Threadneedle Street, or simply The Old Lady. Across that street and nestled in the gap between Cornhill is the commercial centre the Royal Exchange, founded in 1565 by Thomas Gresham, after whom the nearby Gresham Street is named.

Outside the main entrance to the Royal Exchange is an equestrian statue of the Duke of Wellington overlooking Bank Junction; it was inaugurated in June 1844. Also in front of the Royal Exchange is the London Troops War Memorial, commemorating those Londoners who served and died in World War I and World War II. There is also a statue of James Henry Greathead, responsible for an improved tunnelling shield which enabled construction of London's deep-level Underground lines.

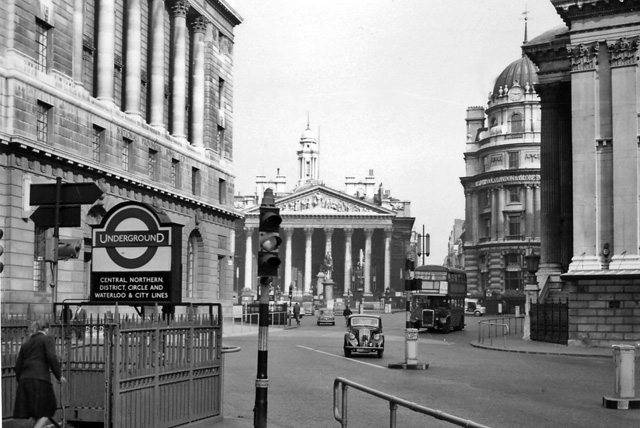
Bank Junction pictured on a Sunday in April 1961

To the south of the junction is Mansion House. This has been the official residence of the Lord Mayor of London since its completion in 1752. Other notable buildings close to Bank Junction include the City of London Magistrates' Court at 1 Queen Victoria Street, No 1 Poultry, the Worshipful Company of Grocers, off Princes Street, and the Worshipful Company of Mercers, on Threadneedle Street.

== Railway links ==
The surrounding pavements host the access steps and ramps to one of London's busiest Underground stations, Bank. Built in 1900, the interchange station is served by the Central, Northern and Waterloo & City lines, as well as the Docklands Light Railway. The station is connected with Monument, a station served by the Circle and District lines – together the two stations form one of the world's most complex underground train stations.

The closest mainline railway stations are Cannon Street, Fenchurch Street and Liverpool Street.
