= 1 Queen Victoria Street =

Building in London, England

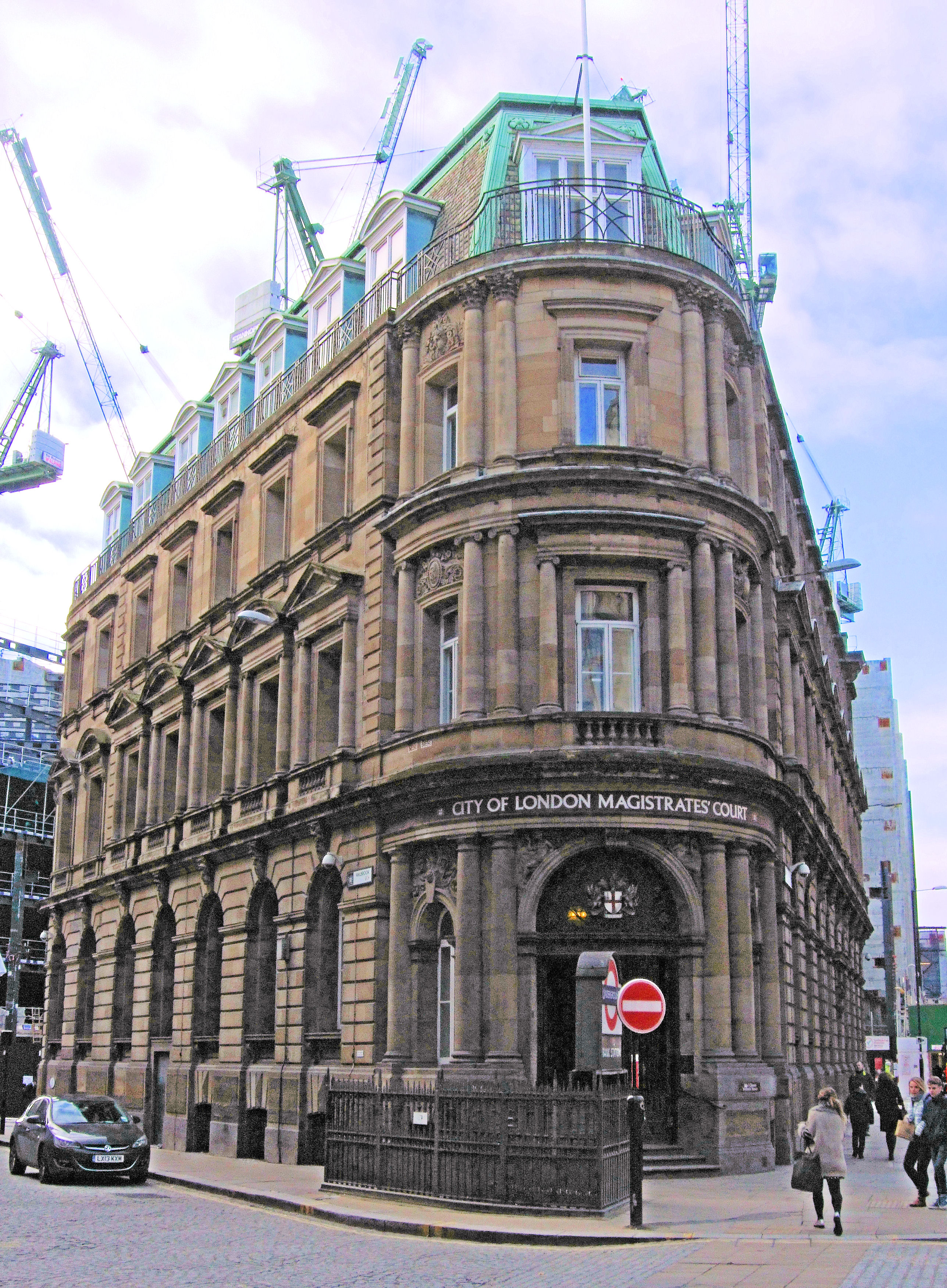
- 1 Queen Victoria Street

General information
- Type: Office
- Architectural style: Italianate, palazzo
- Location: London, England
- Coordinates: 51°30′47″N 0°05′24″W
- Completed: 1875

Design and construction
- Architect: John Whichcord Jr.

Listed Building – Grade II
- Official name: 1, Queen Victoria Street
- Designated: 10 November 1977
- Reference no.: 1358905

1 Queen Victoria Street is a Grade II listed Victorian building that stands on the corner of Queen Victoria Street and Walbrook near Bank Junction in the City of London.

== History ==
The building was constructed between 1873 and 1875 following the establishment of Queen Victoria Street as a cut-through from the Victoria Embankment to the Bank of England. It was built for use by the National Safe Deposit Company. Designed by John Whichcord, the building required the use of iron reinforcements for its vaults. Roman items were found on the site after the previous buildings were cleared.

The building has since been used for other purposes. It hosted the Bank of New Zealand's City of London offices between 1889 and 1988 and is now the City of London Magistrates' Court. Despite the name, the functions of the court are carried out by the City of Westminster, focusing generally on financial crime due to the many financial institutions in The City.

== Design ==
The building employs an Italianate and in particualar Palazzo style, and is built in terracotta. A 1920s mansard replaced the earlier decorative stonework of Whichcord's original design. Culpin Culpin & Partners partly transformed the vaults into cells for use by the court between 1988 and 1991.
