= Metropolitan Hospital Sunday Fund =

UK health charity

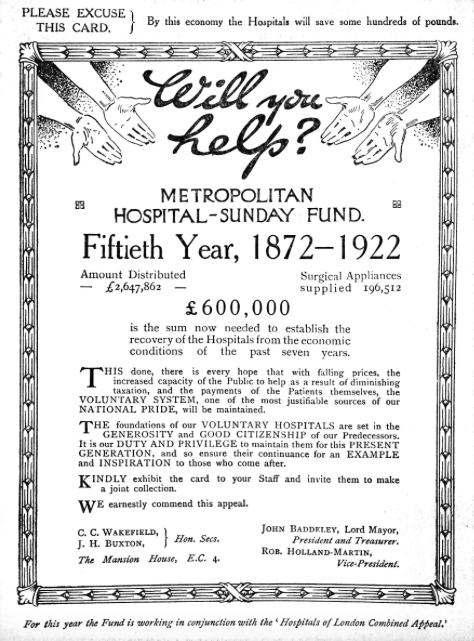
- Founded: 1873
- Founder: Sir Sydney Waterlow
- Region served: London
- Changed name to London Catalyst in 2002

The Metropolitan Hospital Sunday Fund was formed in London in 1873 at a time when all hospitals were voluntary - with no government health services. This situation meant that the poor could not always afford treatment and also that hospitals often did not have equipment that they needed. The Lancet suggested to the Lord Mayor of London, Sir Sydney Waterlow, that churches may be able to raise money to help. Sir Sydney called church leaders to a meeting. At that meeting, it was agreed that annually in June the churches would have one Sunday when they held a collection - and that the funds would be used to help the poor access healthcare, and also assist hospitals with equipment.

The Fund was inaugurated at St Paul's Cathedral by Prince Edward the Prince of Wales (later King Edward VII), with his wife, on the fifteenth of June 1873. Queen Victoria was the Fund's first patron, and gave a hundred guineas toward the Fund.

On the first Sunday 16 June 1873 the total collections from all places of worship was 27,000 pounds. This included collections at Synagogues, Roman Catholic churches, Unitarian church, Church of England and Baptist. Sermons for the Fund were preached at almost 1,100 places of worship The amount raised varied, but over the 14 years from 1873 to 1886 the Fund raised 300,679 pounds from 10,214 collections.

The Lancet continued to support the Fund with annual supplements. The 1898 supplement stated that the Fund raised over £41,000 in the previous year.

Committee meetings continued to be held at either the Mansion House, London, with the current Lord Mayor as president. or the Guildhall, London. Collected money or individual gifts were sent to the Mansion care of the Lord Mayor

A well known London Baptist Preacher of the time, Charles Spurgeon, was an enthusiastic supporter. He left us this quote:

“We must have more hospitals. I do not know whether we shall not be obliged to make the Government spend something in this direction. I don’t believe in the Government doing anything well. I generally feel sorry when anything has to be left to the Government. I don’t mean this Government in particular, but any Government which may be in office for the time being. It is six of one and half-a-dozen of the other. I have a very small opinion of the whole lot. There are some things which we should try ourselves to do as long as ever we can; but if we are driven up a corner, it may come to what I fear. Bones must be set, and the sick must be cared for; the poor must not be left to die, in order not to have to go to the Government for help. So let us all try to give what we can. It is your duty to give, not merely as Christians, but as men. I like the Hospital Sunday movement, for all Christian people can meet, as we are met here to-night, on one platform.”

As well as churches, the Fund collected generally. The most significant early financial supporter was Mr George Herring.

The Sunday Fund idea reached as far as Geelong in Victoria, Australia.

The Fund continues to exist, changing its name in 2002 to London Catalyst Each monarch following Queen Victoria has been the patron of the Fund, with King Charles III its current patron.
