= Threadneedle Street =

Street in the City of London, England

Coordinates: 51.5141°N 0.0868°W

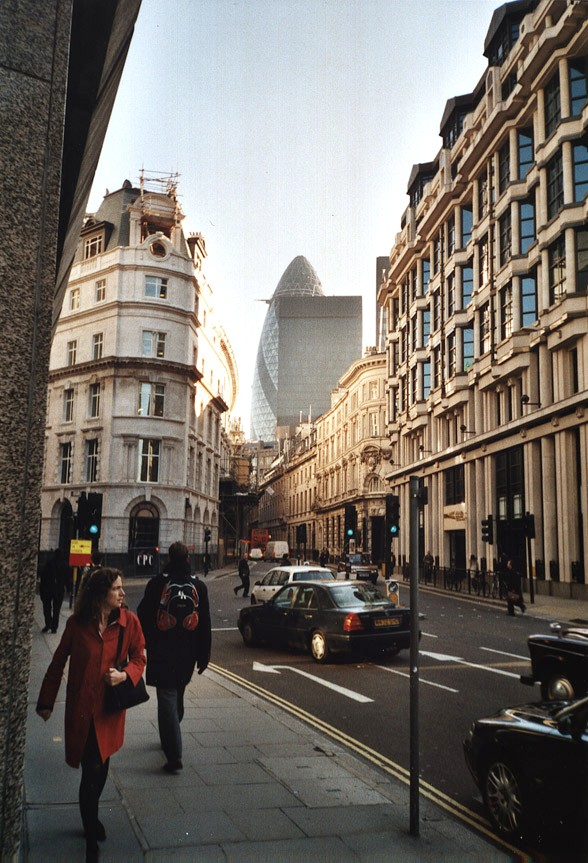
- Looking northeast up Threadneedle Street
- Interactive map of Threadneedle Street
- Length: 0.3 mi (0.48 km)
- Location: London, England
- Postal code: EC2
- Nearest train station: Bank
- Northeast end: Bishopsgate
- Southwest end: Bank junction

Other
- Known for: Bank of England

Threadneedle Street is a street in the City of London, England, between Bishopsgate at its northeast end and Bank Junction in the southwest. It is one of nine streets that converge at Bank. It lies in the ward of Cornhill.

== History ==
Threadneedle Street is famous as the site of the Bank of England. The bank itself is sometimes known as 'the Old Lady of Threadneedle Street' and has been based at its current location since 1734. The London Stock Exchange was situated on Threadneedle Street until 2004, when it relocated to nearby Paternoster Square. The Baltic Exchange was founded in the Virginia and Baltick Coffee House on Threadneedle Street in 1744. It is now located on St Mary Axe.

== Etymology ==
Some believe that the name originated as Three Needle Street, first attested to in 1598, perhaps from a signboard portraying three needles, or from the three needles on the arms of needle-makers who had premises on the street. The threads and needles used by the members of the Worshipful Company of Merchant Taylors are another possibility, since the livery company's hall has been located on Threadneedle Street since 1347. Before 1598, the road was part of Broad Street, now Old Broad Street.

== Points of interest ==
In addition to the Bank of England, there are a number of shops, banks, restaurants and offices located on Threadneedle Street.

The Merchant Taylors' Hall, home of the Worshipful Company of Merchant Taylors, has occupied a site off Threadneedle Street since 1347. Reportedly the British national anthem was sung, in private, in 1607 for the first time, conducted by John Bull.

The headquarters of the South Sea Company was located on the street, from 1711 to the 1850s.

The London office of the world's oldest merchant bank, Berenberg Bank, is located at No. 60.

The nearest London Underground station is Bank and Monument. London's first bus service ran between Threadneedle Street and Paddington from 1829. Today, the street is served by bus routes 8, 11, 23, 26, 133, 242, and 388.

Over 5,000 tonnes of gold bars are held by the Bank of England, both official reserves of the UK Treasury, and others, in a system of eight vaults, over two floors, under Threadneedle Street.
