= Poultry, London =

Short street in the City of London

Poultry
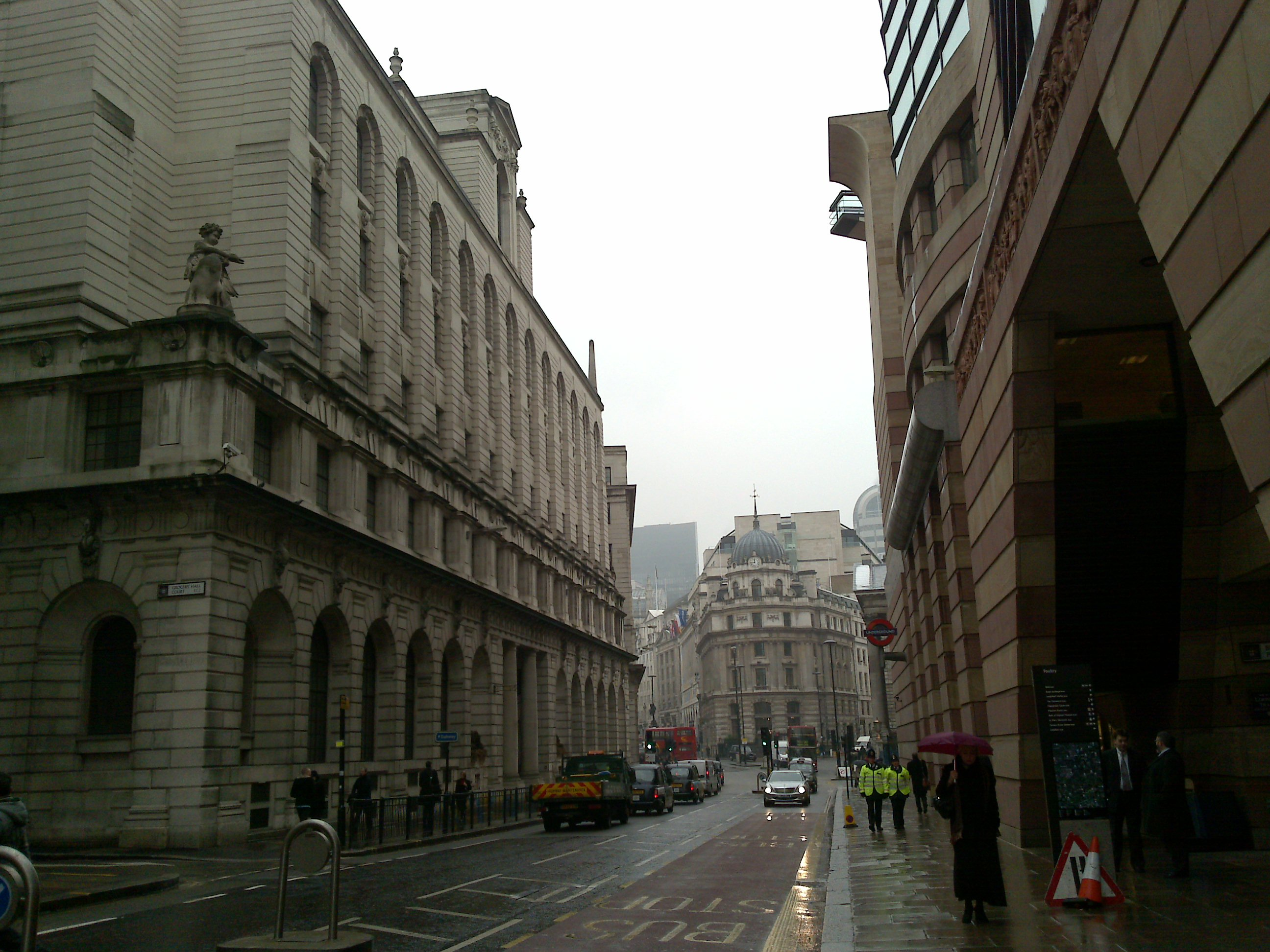
- Looking east down Poultry toward Bank junction in 2009
- Interactive map of Poultry
- Length: 110 m (360 ft)
- Location: London, United Kingdom
- Postal code: EC2
- Nearest train station: Bank
- Coordinates: 51°30′49″N 0°5′27.84″W
- West end: Cheapside
- East end: Mansion House Street

Poultry (formerly also Poultrey) is a short street in the City of London, which is the historic nucleus and financial centre of modern London. It is an eastern continuation of Cheapside, between Old Jewry and Mansion House Street, towards Bank Junction in Central London.

== Etymology ==
Poultry takes its name, like other roads nearby such as Milk Street and Bread Street, from the various produce once sold at Cheapside (meaning "market-place" in Old English). John Stow, writing at the end of the 16th century, noted that "the poulterers are but lately departed from thence into other streets".

== History ==
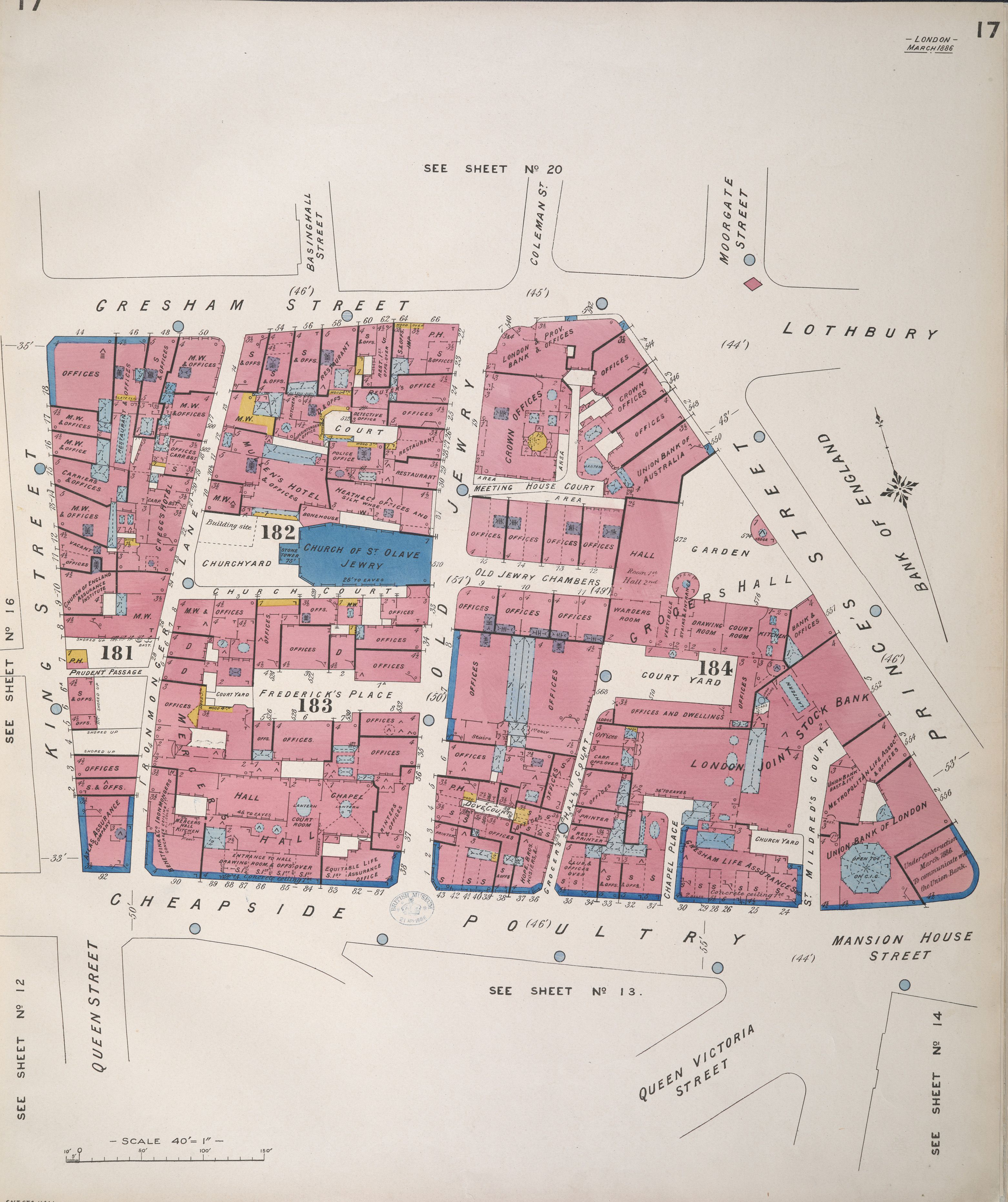
Block lining the north side of the street in 1877. Shows where Cheapside has its invisible eastern start, to the west.

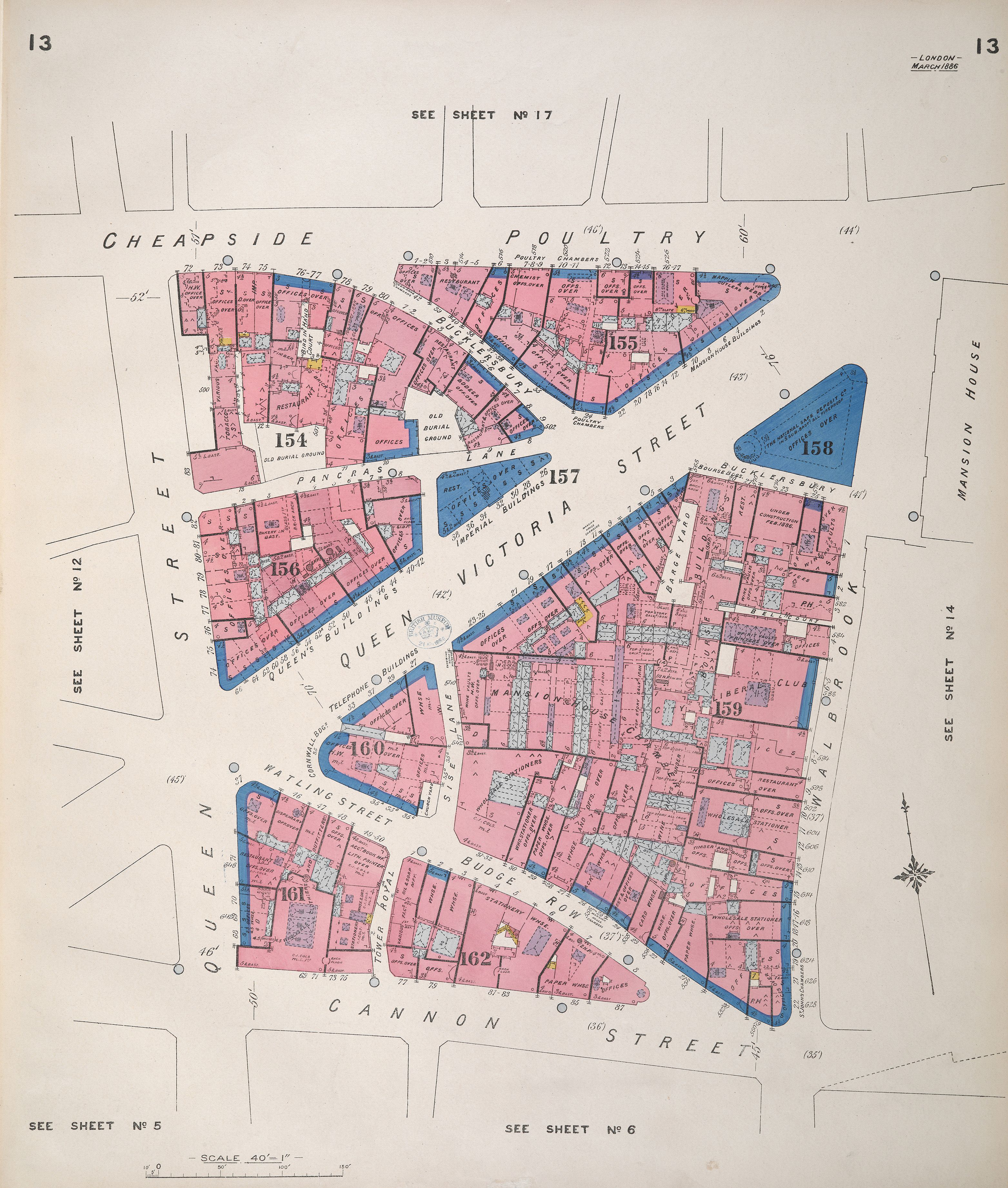
The rounded-corner triangular block lining the south side of the street, which was much more divided into units, in 1877

The thoroughfare was also known for some time as Conningshop Lane/Coneys shop lane due to the brace of three stuffed coney skins over a notable poulterer's stall, thus who also served game. From the 15th to early 17th century, the lane had several taverns, but few were rebuilt after the Great Fire of 1666.

Part of the north side hosted the church of Saint Mildred. Rebuilt after the Great Fire to the designs of Sir Christopher Wren, it was demolished in 1872 and its site used to build the Gresham Life Assurance office. In 1891, Henry B. Wheatley wrote that, with the removal of the church,

"the clearing away of the old houses on both sides of the way, and the erection in their place of large blocks of offices and shops of considerable architectural pretensions, and the general widening of the thoroughfare, the Poultry has since 1850 been entirely changed in character and aspect."

The street gave its name to a prison, Poultry Compter. It was a brick building in its heyday, having fifteen wards, of which one was for Jews. It was closed in the early 19th century and its prisoners transferred to the new White Cross/Whitecross Street Compter/Prison.

== Notable buildings ==
Although short, it is lined by notable buildings. No 1 Poultry is a postmodern office and retail building which is home to the Coq d'Argent restaurant, which includes a rooftop terrace and formal garden, and takes up what were numbers 1 to 17. Opposite, a wide alley, Grocers' Hall Court, leads to the livery hall of the Worshipful Company of Grocers, one of the City's original twelve great livery companies that ranks second in their order of precedence. Its main entrance is on Princes Street.

The bulk of the north side 27–35 Poultry was the London headquarters of Midland Bank, a Grade I listed building.

== See also ==
- Bucklersbury, London

== Sources ==
- Wheatley, Henry B. (1891). London Past and Present: Its History, Associations and Traditions. Vol. 3. London: John Murray.
- Google Maps
