= Bank and Monument stations =

London Underground and DLR stations

Bank and Monument
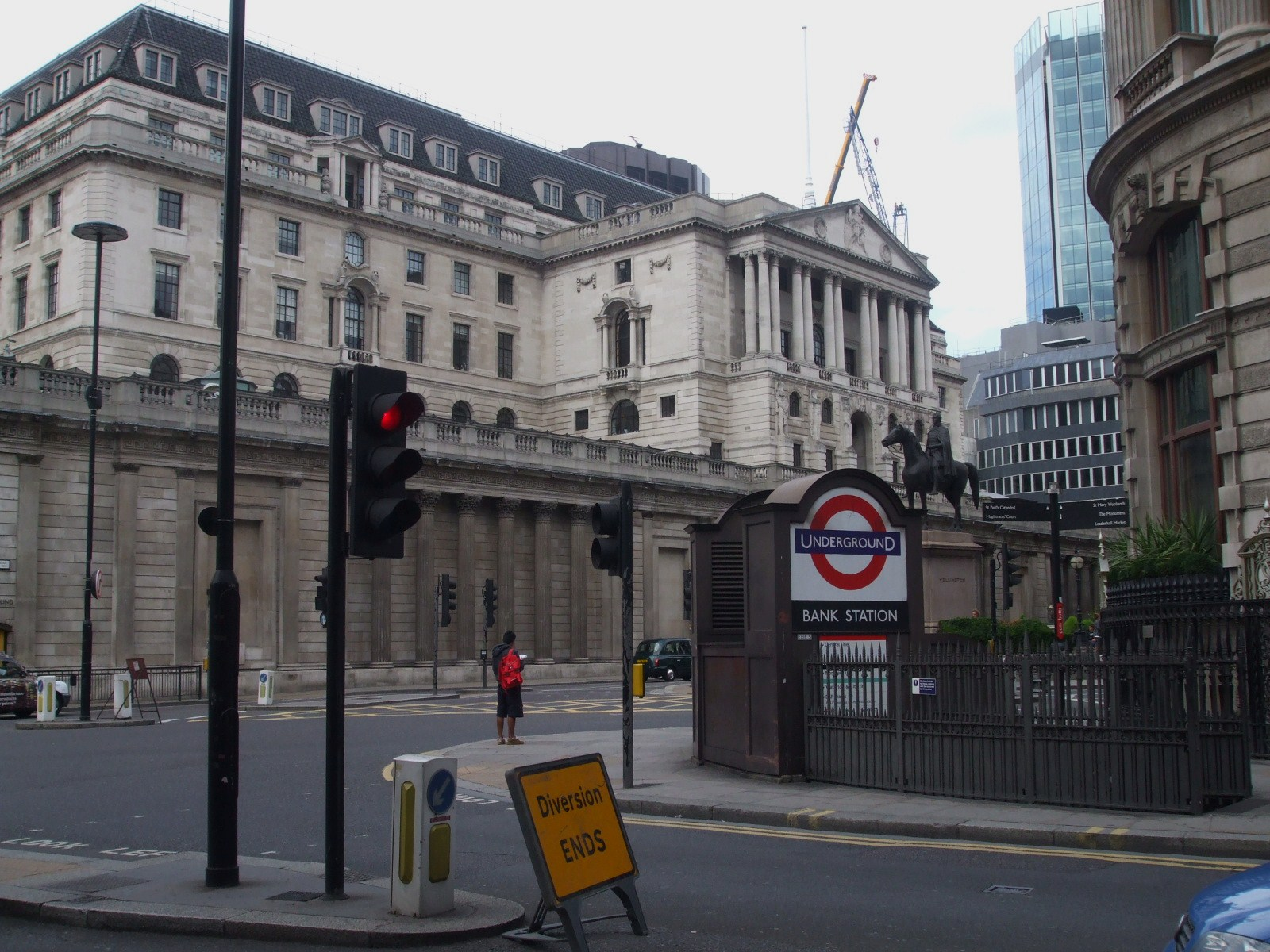
- Entrance at the Bank of England, by Bank Junction
- Interactive map of Bank and Monument

General information
- Location: Princes Street (Bank); King William Street (Monument)
- Local authority: City of London
- Managed by: London Underground
- Number of platforms: 10
- Accessible: Yes (Northern line and DLR only)
- Fare zone: 1
- OSI: Bank: Cannon Street; Fenchurch Street; Liverpool Street; Monument: Fenchurch Street

London Underground annual entry and exit
- 2021: ▲17.66 million
- 2022: ▲34.41 million
- 2023: ▲37.20 million
- 2024: ▲38.39 million
- 2025: ▲41.12 million

DLR annual boardings and alightings
- 2021: ▲12.475 million
- 2022: No data (Note: DLR passenger data for 2022 is included in the London Underground figure.)
- 2023: No data (Note: DLR passenger data for 2023 is included in the London Underground figure.)
- 2024: No data (Note: DLR passenger data for 2024 is included in the London Underground figure.)
- 2025: No data (Note: DLR passenger data for 2025 is included in the London Underground figure.)

Key dates
- 6 October 1884: Opened (MICCR)
- 8 August 1898: Opened (W&CR)
- 25 February 1900: Opened (C&SLR)
- 30 July 1900: Opened (CLR)
- 18 September 1933: Bank-Monument escalator link opened
- 29 July 1991: Opened (DLR)
- 27 February 2023: Station upgrade and expansion completed

Listed status
- Listed feature: Entrance within Bank of England & Redundant entrance within St Mary Woolnoth
- Listing grade: I
- Entry number: 1079134 (Bank); 1064620 (Church)
- Added to list: 4 January 1950

Other information
- External links: TfL station info page - Bank * TfL station info page - Monument
- Coordinates: 51.513°N 0.088°W

Bank and Monument are two interlinked stations in the City of London that form a public transport complex served by five lines of the London Underground as well as the Docklands Light Railway (DLR).

Bank station, named after the nearby Bank of England, opened in 1900 at Bank Junction and is served by the Central, Northern and Waterloo & City lines of the Underground, and the DLR. Monument station, named after the Monument to the Great Fire of London, opened in 1884 and is served by the Circle and District lines. The stations have been linked as an interchange since 1933.

One of the busiest on the London Underground network, the station complex was previously rated the Underground's worst station in passenger surveys. A substantial upgrade and expansion was completed in 2023 after seven years of construction. The station has 31 escalators and 4 moving walkways, the most of any station on the Underground. The stations are in London fare zone 1.

== History ==
The Bank–Monument station complex was created by building links between several nearby stations constructed by different companies. The first station was opened by the Metropolitan Inner Circle Completion Railway.

=== Metropolitan Inner Circle Completion Railway, 1884 ===
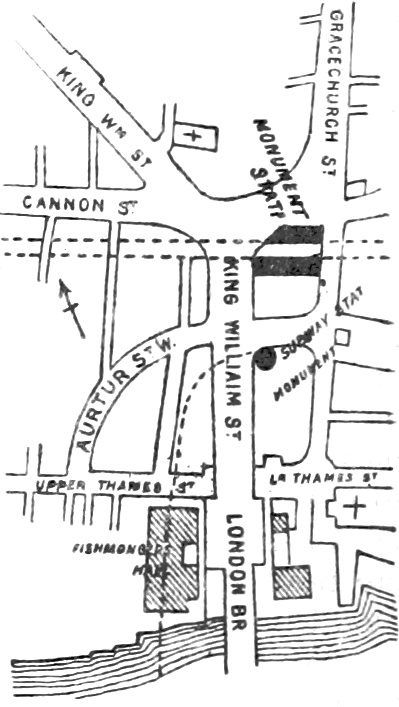
Monument station on an 1888 map. The C&SLR's King William Street station, then under construction, is also shown.

The Metropolitan Railway (MR) and District Railway (DR) had, by 1876, built most of the Inner Circle (now the Circle line), reaching Aldgate and Mansion House respectively. The companies were in dispute over the completion of the route, for the DR was struggling financially and the MR was concerned that completion would affect its revenues through increased competition from the DR in the City area. City financiers who were keen to see the line completed established the Metropolitan Inner Circle Completion Railway in 1874 to link Mansion House to Aldgate. Forced into action, the MR bought out the company and with the DR began construction of the final section of the Inner Circle in 1879. The new section of railway included two new stations: Tower of London and another located close to the Monument.

The station at Monument opened with the name "Eastcheap" on 6 October 1884, after the nearby street, and was renamed "The Monument" on 1 November 1884. Initially, trains from both companies served the station on the Inner Circle service, but other operational patterns have been used. In 1909, a new entrance was completed to a design by architect George Campbell Sherrin, which included a new entrance incorporating commercial space where the booking hall had previously been located. The Inner Circle service achieved a separate identity as the Circle line in 1949, although its trains were still provided by the District or Metropolitan lines.

=== Waterloo & City Railway, 1898 ===
The Waterloo & City Railway was built by the London and South Western Railway (L&SWR) to link its terminus at Waterloo to the City. The station, with platforms under Queen Victoria Street and close to Mansion House, opened on 8 August 1898 as "City".

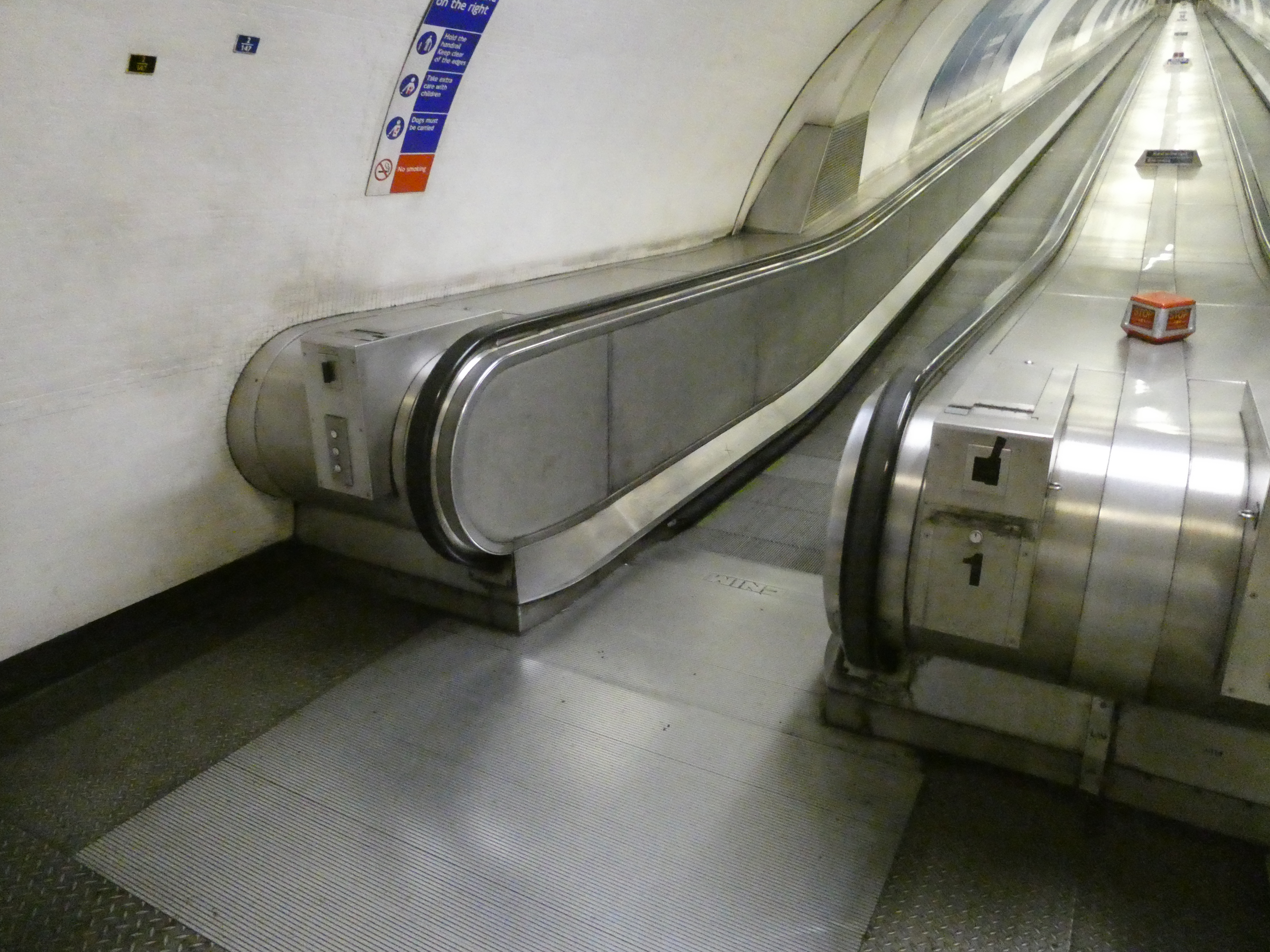
Moving walkway connecting the Waterloo & City line platforms with the station concourse

The Waterloo & City line platforms were renamed "Bank" on 28 October 1940. In September 1960, two 92 metres (302 ft) moving pavements by Otis named the "Trav-o-lators" were installed, in a sloped tunnel with a diameter of 5 metres (16 ft) approximately parallel to the existing access subway. It remains one of the few sets of moving walkways on the whole Underground system, and the walls and ceilings of the sloped exits are often used for advertising.

As the W&CR was owned by the L&SWR, a mainline railway, it became part of British Rail; it was only transferred to Underground operation in 1994.

=== City & South London Railway, 1900 ===
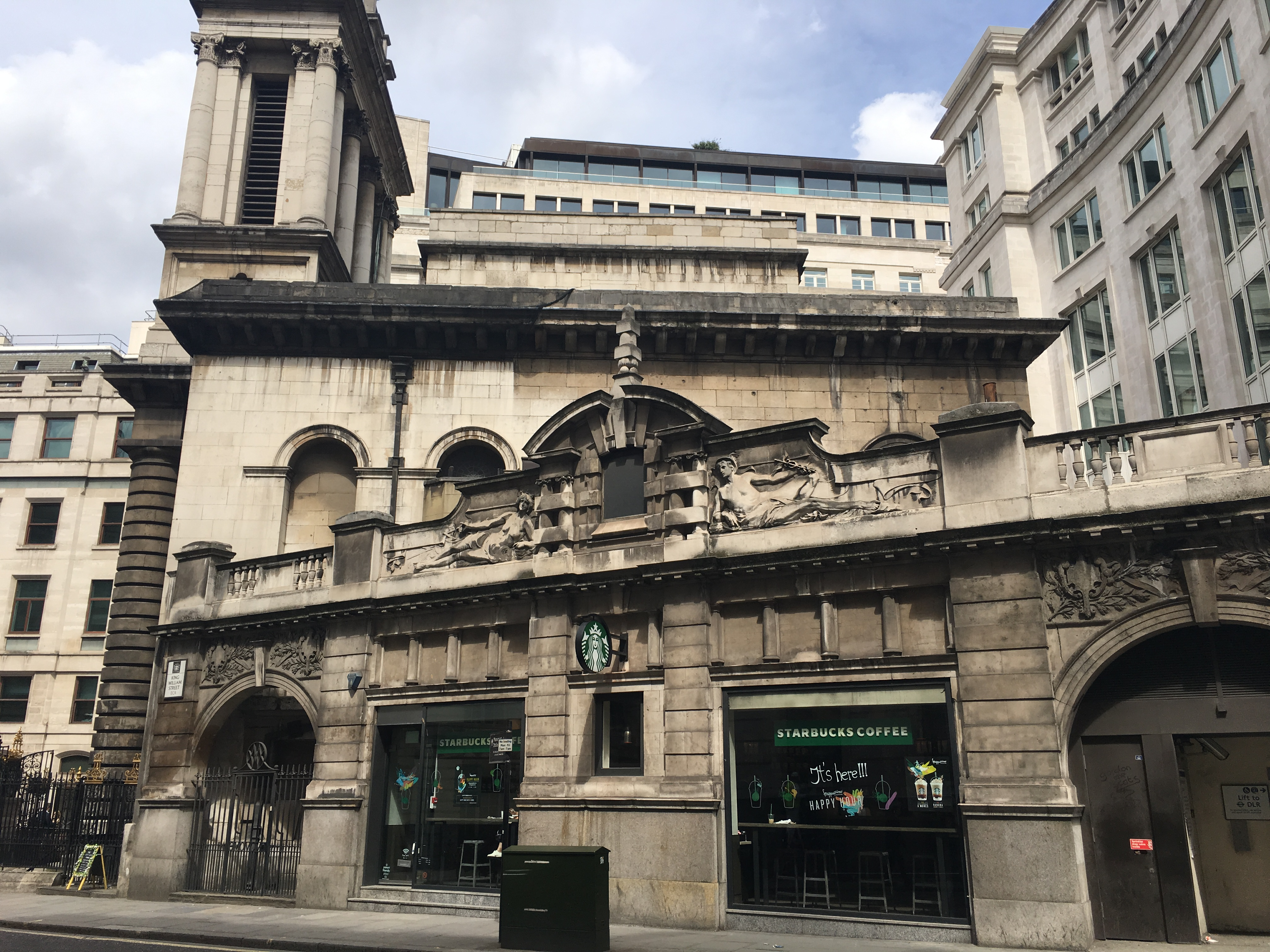
The entrance to the former C&SLR station, now a branch of Starbucks, with the church of St Mary Woolnoth behind

The first station to be known as Bank opened on 25 February 1900, when the City & South London Railway (C&SLR, now part of the Northern line) opened its extension from Borough to Moorgate. The earlier terminus of the line, King William Street, on a different tunnel alignment, was closed at the same time.

The C&SLR had obtained permission to demolish the 18th-century church of St Mary Woolnoth on the corner of Lombard Street and build a station (originally proposed to be named "Lombard Street") on the site. After public protest, the company changed its plans to build only a sub-surface ticket hall and lift entrance in the crypt of the church. This necessitated moving the bodies elsewhere, strengthening the crypt with a steel framework and underpinning the church's foundations. Unusually for stations later converted to escalators, the original lift access from the ticket hall is still in use.

=== Central London Railway, 1900 ===
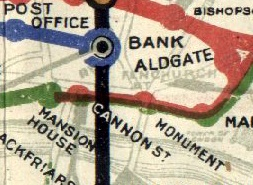
Bank and Monument shown on a 1908 Tube map. Bank was served by the Central London (blue), City & South London (black), and Waterloo & City (thin grey) railways, while Monument was served by the Metropolitan (red) and District (green) railways. The stations were not yet connected.

The opening of the eastern terminus of the Central London Railway (CLR, now the Central line) at Bank followed on 30 July 1900.

As with the C&SLR, the high cost of property in the City, coupled with the presence of the Royal Exchange, the Bank of England, and Mansion House, meant that the station had to be built entirely underground. Permission was granted by the City of London Corporation for the station to be sited beneath the busy junction of roads meeting at this point on condition that public subways were provided to act as pedestrian road crossings. To avoid undermining the road above, the station's lifts were installed in separate lift shafts rather than paired two-per-shaft as usual.

To avoid wayleave payments to property owners and to lessen possible claims for damage during construction and operation, the CLR tunnels were directly under public streets. This caused the platforms under Threadneedle Street and Poultry to be so curved that one end of the platform cannot be seen from the other. East of Bank station the Central line tunnels have sharp curves to avoid the vaults of the Bank of England itself. Due to the close proximity of the CLR, W&CR and C&SLR stations, and the non-competing directions of their services, their ticket halls were soon connected, but connection between the CLR and C&SLR platforms were made only when escalators were installed in 1924. The CLR station itself was reconstructed during the major rebuilding of the Bank of England in 1925. The booking hall underneath Bank Junction was redecorated and a new subway entrance built into the corner of the Bank of England itself.

=== Monument link, 1933 ===
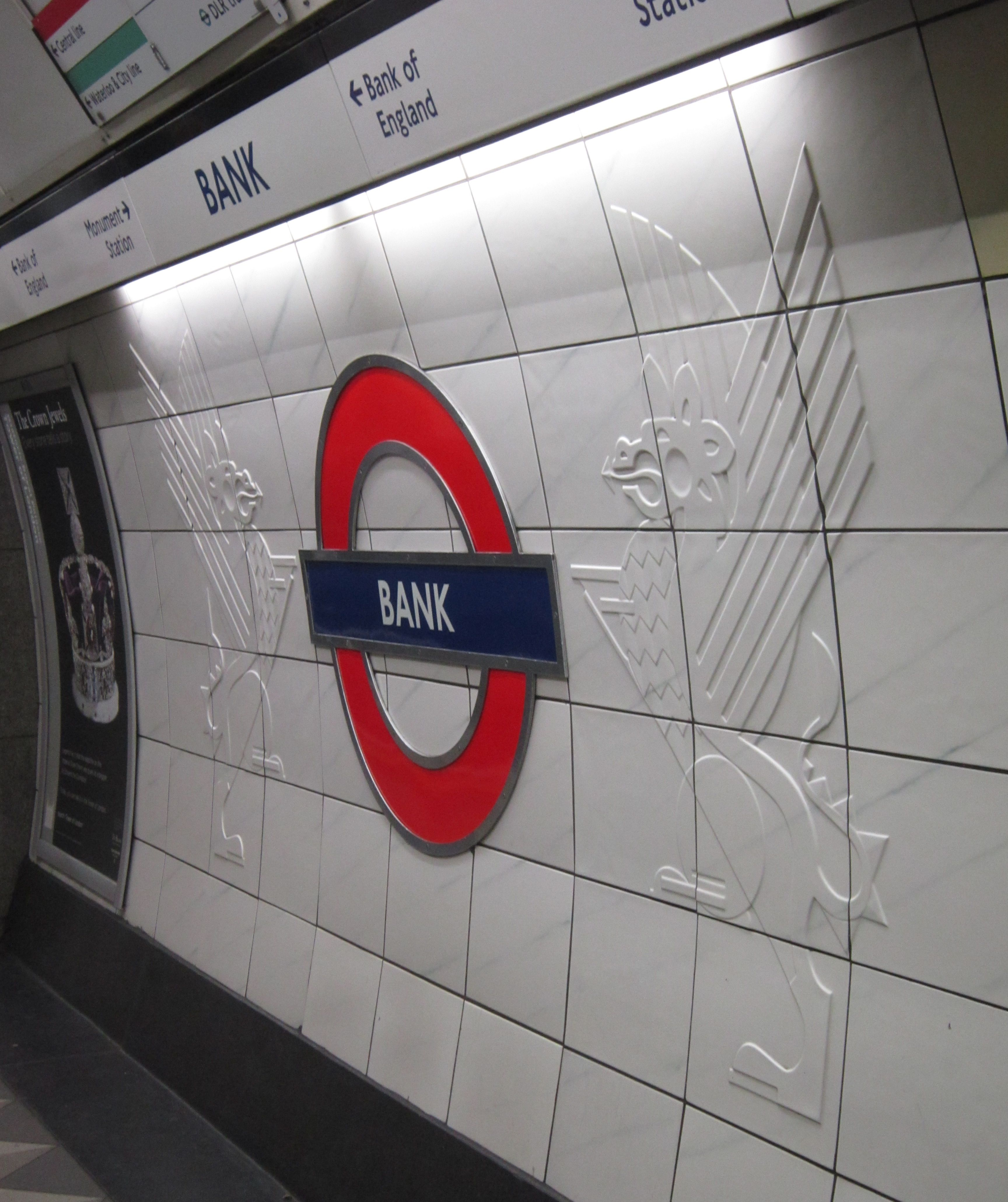
Wall tiles at the station show the supporters of City of London coat of arms, combined with the station roundel.

The southern end of the C&SLR (which by then was part of the Edgware-Morden line) platforms was close to those of Monument station and, on 18 September 1933, a connecting escalator link was opened, connecting the two stations directly for the first time.

=== Second World War ===
During the Blitz, the station was used as a bomb shelter. On 11 January 1941, the Central line ticket hall of Bank station suffered a direct hit from a German bomb. The roadway collapsed into the subways and station concourse, killing 56 people.

=== Docklands Light Railway and station refurbishment, 1990s ===
In 1991, the Docklands Light Railway was extended to Bank station, following criticism of the original, poorly connected terminus at Tower Gateway. The new platforms were built parallel to but deeper than those of the Northern line, with connections at one end to the Central line and Monument Station at the other. As part of the construction of the extension, a new link between the Waterloo & City and the Central line was excavated – uncovering part of one of the Greathead tunnelling shields used for the Waterloo & City line. This shield forms part of the new passageway, and passengers pass through when transferring between the two lines. As with all other DLR stations, the DLR platforms were made accessible to those in wheelchairs, however the route was indirect with the use of three different passenger lifts required to reach the DLR.

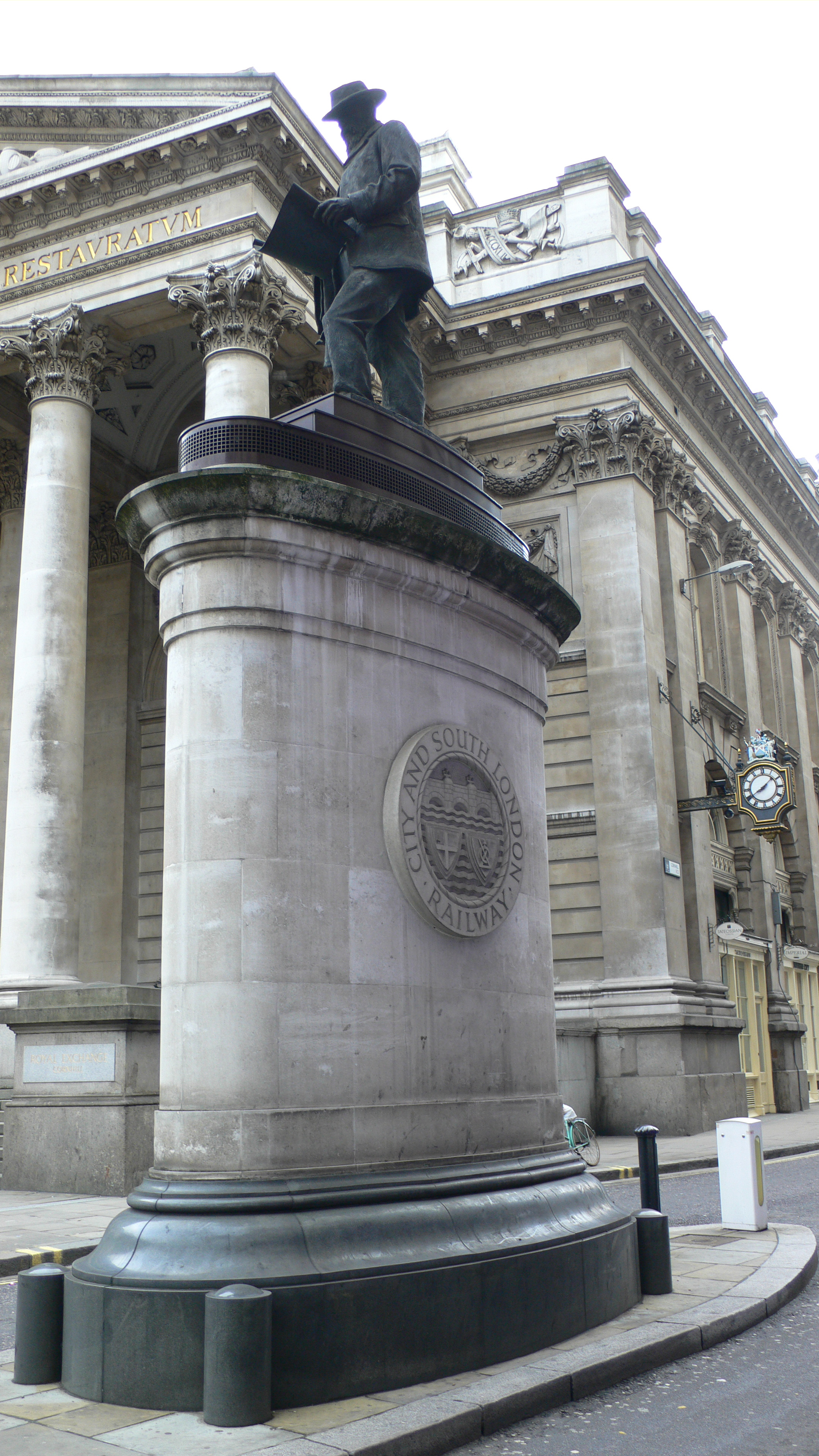
Statue of James Henry Greathead, which was erected by Bank station in 1994

In January 1994, a statue of James Henry Greathead was erected outside the station, next to the Royal Exchange. It was unveiled by the Lord Mayor of London and is positioned on a plinth which hides a ventilation shaft for the Underground.

The rest of the station was comprehensively refurbished, with decorative tiling panels based on the City's coat of arms, new lighting and replacement of escalators. This work was completed in 1997, partially funded by the City of London Corporation.

=== New Bloomberg entrance, 2010s ===
In the late 2010s, a new entrance was constructed at Bloomberg's new London headquarters on Walbrook, near Cannon Street station, providing direct access to the Waterloo & City line via four new escalators and two lifts – providing step-free access to that line for the first time. First announced in 2008, construction began in November 2015 following delays due to the financial crisis. The new entrance was opened on 30 November 2018, and was officially opened by Mayor of London Sadiq Khan and former Mayor of New York Michael Bloomberg in December 2018.

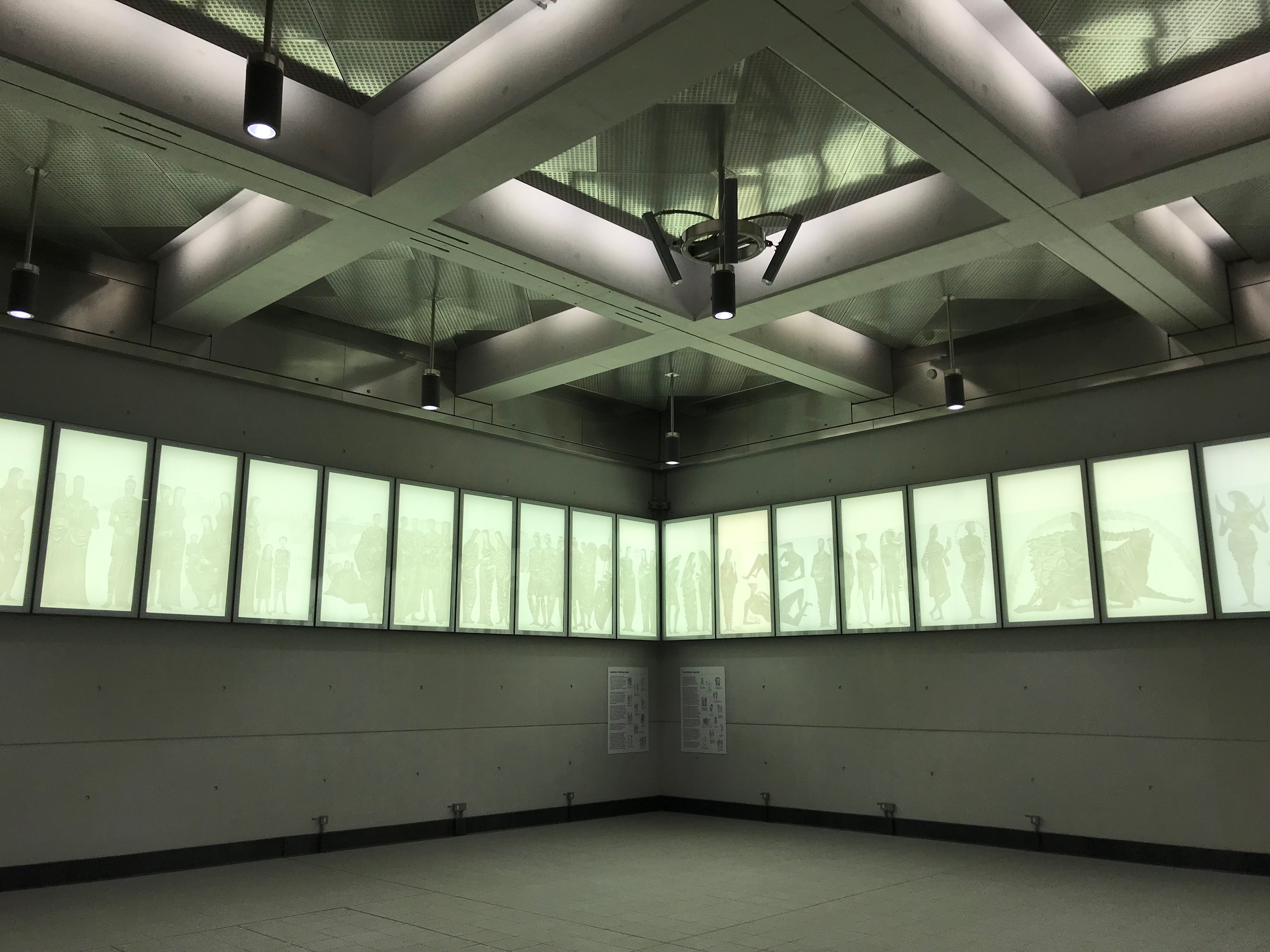
Etched glass panels by artist John Hutton

The new entrance incorporates etched glass panels by artist John Hutton, depicting 66 figures based on the ancient Roman history of the area, including the Roman Temple of Mithras. The artwork was originally completed in 1962 on Bucklersbury House, the post war office building previously located on the site.

== Station upgrade and expansion ==
Between 2003 and 2014, demand at the Bank–Monument station complex rose by over 50% to 337,000 customers per day. The station complex was also rated the Underground's worst station in passenger surveys.

According to Transport for London, "areas of the station [were] close to 'saturation' point, where day-to-day demand overwhelms capacity". Unlike other congested stations such as Oxford Circus, passengers could not be held back at station entrances during peak times to avoid overwhelming the station, as around half of the passengers are interchanging between lines. The narrow passageways, pinch points, spiral staircases and indirect routes between lines exacerbated the high demand on the station. Some parts of the station operated "one way", with staff directing passengers on longer routes to increase the capacity of the station. Given these issues, the station complex was substantially upgraded between 2016 and 2023, increasing capacity by 40%, at a cost of around £700 million. The overall project – incorporating twelve new escalators, two new lifts and two moving walkways – included:

- A new southbound platform for the Northern line and conversion of the existing southbound platform to passenger circulation space.
- New direct passenger tunnel with moving walkways connecting the Northern line and Central line.
- New escalators between the Northern line and the DLR
- A new station entrance and ticket hall on Cannon Street, just east of St Mary Abchurch, with new escalators and step-free access to the Northern line and DLR.
- Modernising the station to comply with contemporary fire and evacuation standards.

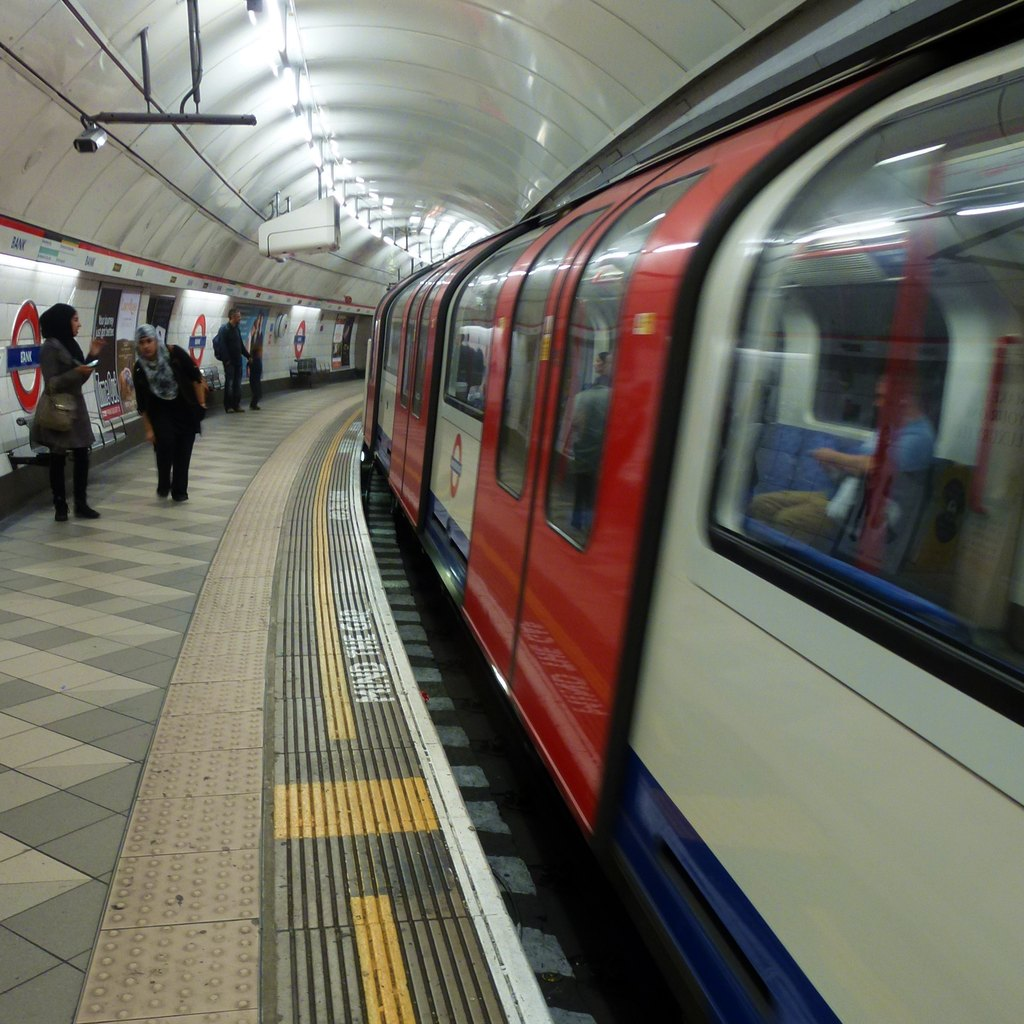
The curved Central line platform at Bank, showing the 1-foot (30 cm) gap between the train and the platform edge (delineated by the solid white line)

Owing to the severe curvature of the Central line platforms, there is a substantial gap between the train and the platform. Because of this, no step-free access was included in the upgrade plan, as the cost would be prohibitive and the solution would be difficult for passengers to use.

TfL described the construction of the project as "intricate and complicated", with over 30 listed buildings in the historic City of London located above the tunnels. The new southbound Northern line tunnel was dug from a worksite on King William Street, using the underground spaces left over from the closed King William Street tube station. Former running tunnels have previously been used as circulation space at Angel and London Bridge stations.

As part of the development of the scheme, TfL worked with potential bidders to improve the design of the station from TfL's original design. The design proposed in the winning bid by Dragados was 9.7% cheaper than the original design (saving TfL £60 million), took ten months less time to construct than the original design (the proposed closure of the Northern line was also five weeks shorter), and made the layout of the station more efficient. This improved the benefit–cost ratio by 45%, from 2.4:1 to 3.5:1.

=== Progress ===
Following consultations in the early 2010s, and a Transport and Works Act Order in 2015, construction of the new Northern line tunnel began in April 2016, and was estimated to take six years. By July 2019, the project had reached the halfway stage. By October 2020, the majority of tunnelling work, around 1.3 kilometres (0.8 mi), had been completed, with around 200,000 tonnes of material excavated from beneath the City. By July 2021, installation of escalators was underway, as well as preparation work to connect to the new Northern line tunnels in 2022. From January until mid May 2022, the Northern line through Bank was closed – this was required to allow the existing line to be connected to the new running tunnels, convert the previous southbound platform to a new passenger concourse, as well as final fit-out and integration works throughout the expanded station complex.

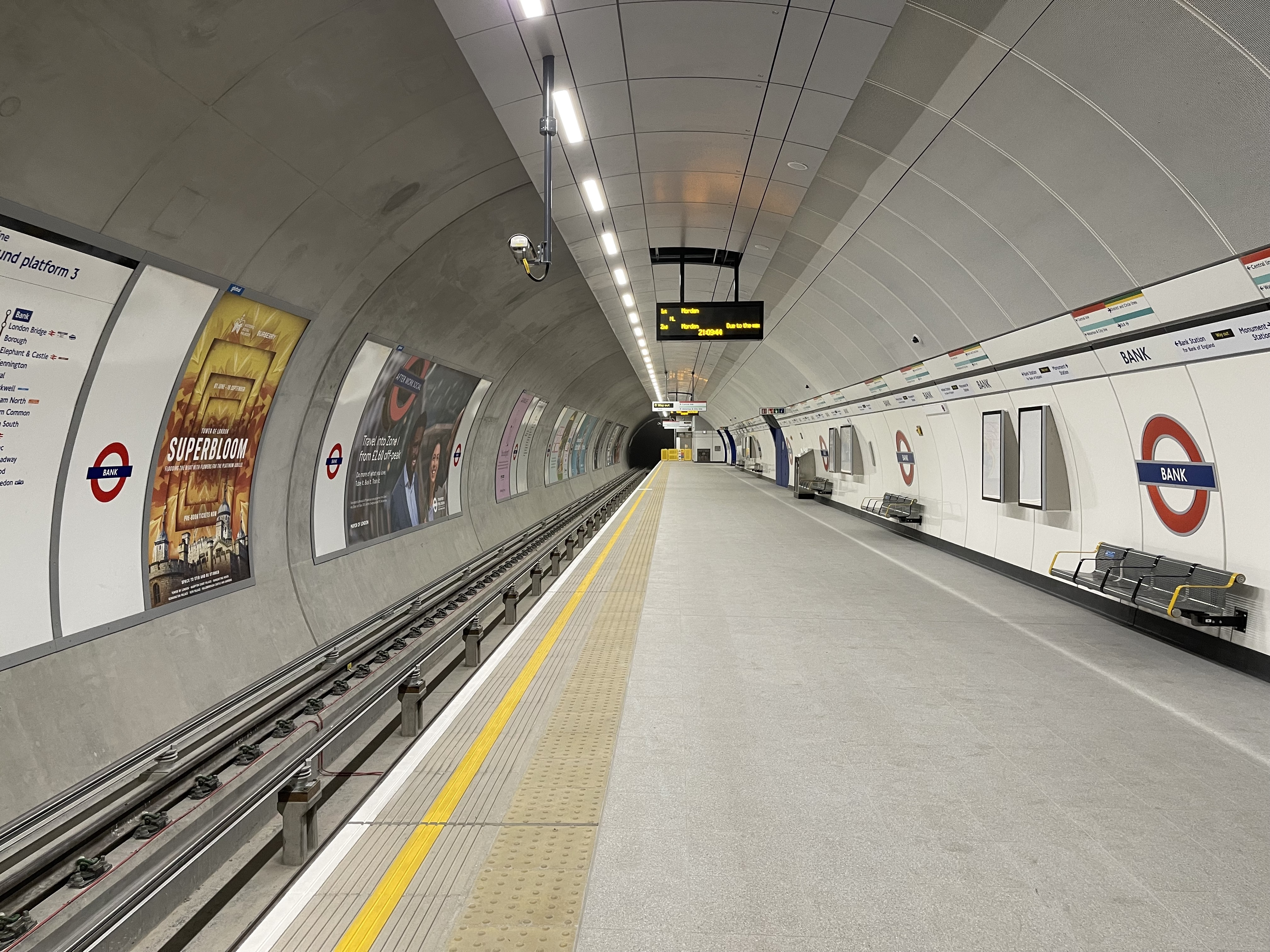
The new southbound platform for the Northern line, which opened in 2022

On 15 May 2022, the new Northern line southbound platform and concourse was opened, the first part of the station expansion open to the public. On 13 October, new escalators connecting the DLR and the Northern line opened. On 28 October, a moving walkway between the Central and Northern lines was opened. These new connections cut the time taken to interchange between lines, as well as expanding the capacity of the station. On 27 February 2023, the project was completed with the opening of the new Cannon Street entrance, as well as lifts providing step-free access to the Northern line and improving the step-free access to the DLR. The station has 27 escalators, the most of any station on the Underground. In September 2024, the upgrade project won an industry award, with judges describing it as "an extremely successful major project, in an extremely challenging circumstances at an extremely challenging location”.

== Ticket halls and entrances ==
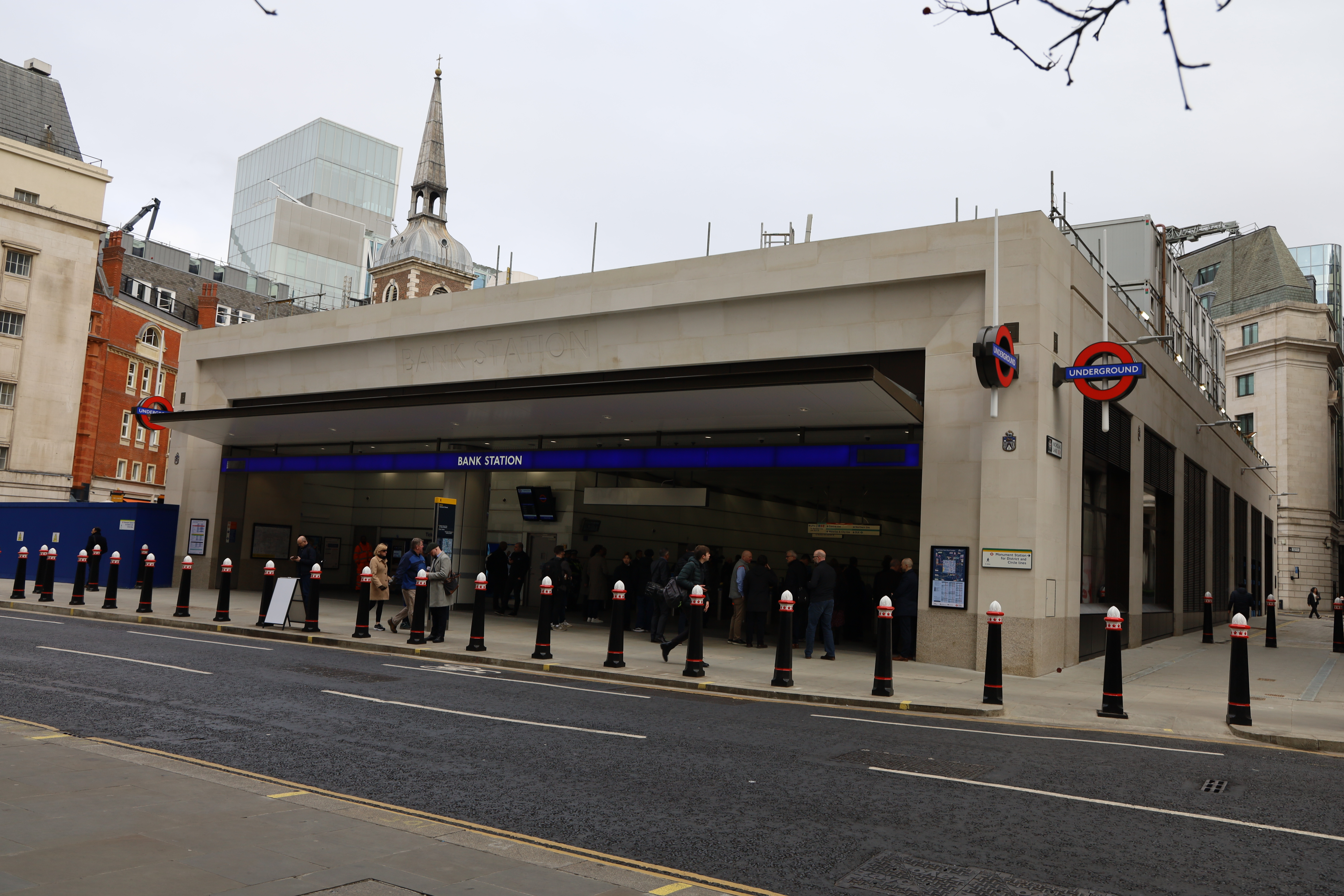
Cannon Street entrance, which opened in 2023

Following the opening of the Cannon Street entrance in 2023, the station complex has sixteen entrances and five ticket halls, the most of any station on the Underground.

- Bullring (Central line) ticket hall, located underneath Bank Junction.
- Lombard Street (Northern line) ticket hall, located under Lombard Street.
- Monument ticket hall, located under Monument Street adjacent to the Monument to the Great Fire of London, serving the District & Circle lines.
- Walbrook ticket hall, at Bloomberg London, serving the Waterloo & City line.
- Cannon Street ticket hall, on Cannon Street located just east of St Mary Abchurch.

== Notable events ==
On 11 January 1941, during the Blitz, 56 people were killed and 69 were seriously injured when a German bomb hit the booking hall, with the blast travelling down the stairs and escalators to the platforms. The crater, measuring 120 by 100 feet (37 m × 30 m), was covered with a Bailey bridge for the traffic to pass over. The station itself was closed for two months.

On 7 September 2003, Bank station was used for a disaster training exercise, Exercise Osiris, billed as "the most realistic live disaster exercise of its kind". The event, lasting several hours and involving about 500 police, fire brigade, ambulance and London Underground personnel, was intended to prepare the emergency services for mass decontamination in the event of a chemical, biological, radiological or nuclear attack.

== Connections ==
A large number of London Buses routes serve the station complex day and night.

== Notes ==
Bank station
Preceding station	London Underground	Following station
St Paul's towards Ealing Broadway or West Ruislip	Central line	Liverpool Street towards Epping, Hainault or Woodford via Newbury Park
Moorgate towards Edgware, Mill Hill East or High Barnet	Northern line Bank branch	London Bridge towards Morden
Waterloo Terminus	Waterloo & City line Mondays to Fridays only	Terminus
Preceding station	DLR	Following station
Terminus	Docklands Light Railway Bank–Lewisham	Shadwell towards Lewisham
Terminus	Docklands Light Railway Bank–Woolwich	Shadwell towards Woolwich Arsenal
Monument station
Preceding station	London Underground	Following station
Cannon Street towards Edgware Road via Victoria	Circle line	Tower Hill towards Hammersmith via King's Cross St Pancras
Cannon Street towards Wimbledon, Richmond or Ealing Broadway	District line	Tower Hill towards Upminster
Former services
Preceding station	London Underground	Following station
Cannon Street towards Wimbledon, Richmond or Ealing Broadway	District line (1884–1967)	Mark Lane towards Upminster, High Street Kensington or Edgware Road
