= 1904 in art =

Events from the year 1904 in art.

== Events ==
- April
  - Octavian Smigelschi is selected to paint the interior decoration of Holy Trinity Cathedral, Sibiu.
  - George Frederic Watts (dies 1 July) opens the Watts Gallery in the English village of Compton, Guildford, for the display of his work.
- November – The Potters (artists group) is formed by female artists in St. Louis, Missouri.
- Start of Picasso's Rose Period.
- Georges Braque leaves the Academie Humbert.
- Mary Cassatt is awarded the Légion d'honneur by the French government for her services to the arts.
- British Impressionist painter Wilfrid de Glehn marries American portrait painter Jane Erin Emmet.
- Kaiser-Friedrich-Museum, Berlin, designed by Ernst von Ihne and noted for its Skulpturensammlung, is completed.

== Works ==
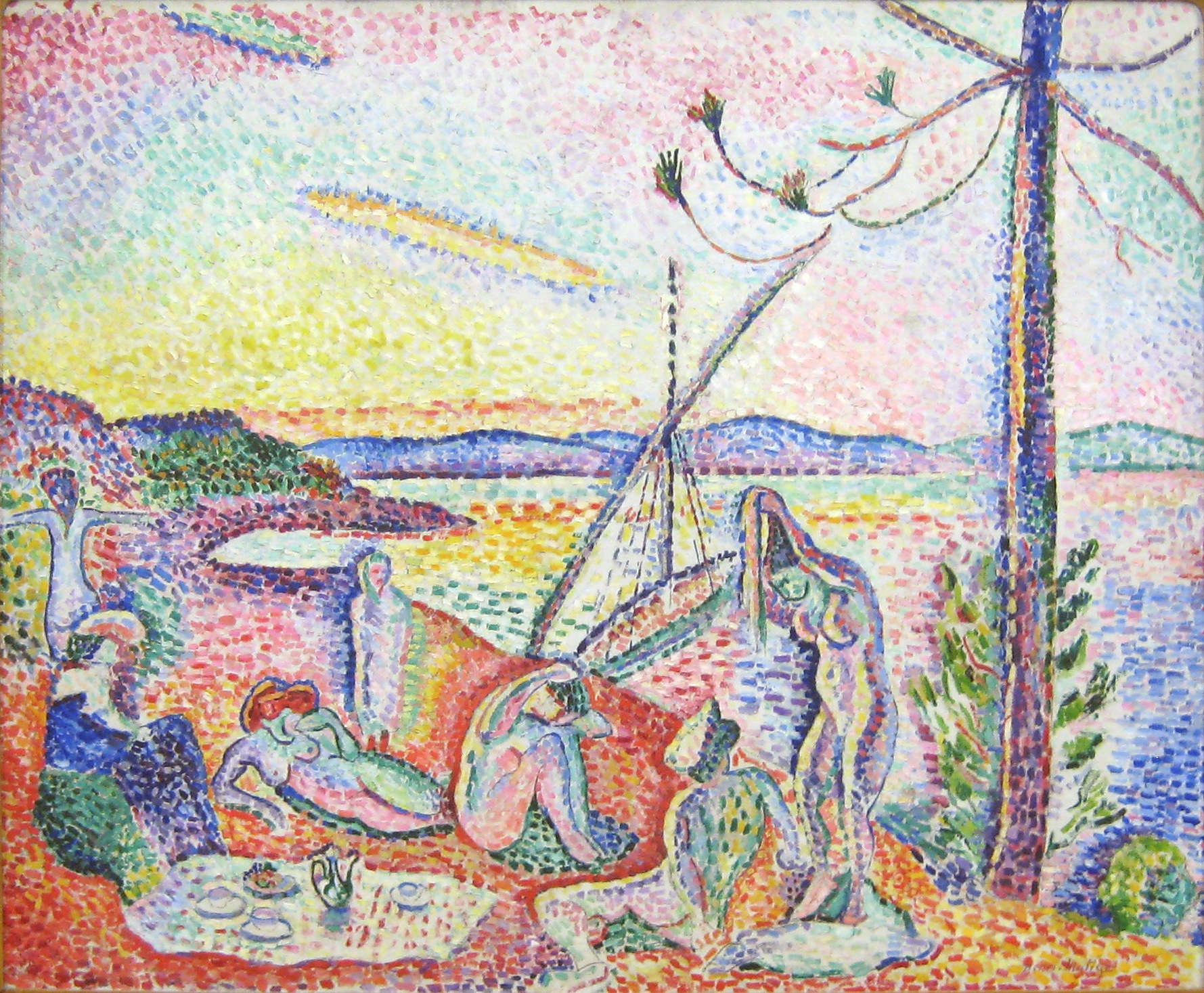
Henri Matisse, Luxe, Calme et Volupté, 1904, Musée d'Orsay

=== Paintings ===
- Lawrence Alma-Tadema – The Finding of Moses
- Paul Cézanne
  - Mont Sainte-Victoire (Philadelphia Museum of Art)
  - La Montagne Sainte-Victoire vue du bosquet du Château Noir
  - Lady in Blue
- Mikalojus Konstantinas Čiurlionis – A Day
- Walter Dexter – The Carpenter's Workshop
- Herbert James Draper – The Golden Fleece
- Florence Fuller – Summer Breezes
- J. W. Godward
  - Dolce far Niente (second version)
  - In The Days Of Sappho
  - A Melody
- Thomas Cooper Gotch – Innocence
- Vilhelm Hammershøi – Interior with Young Woman Seen from the Back
- Winslow Homer – Kissing the Moon
- Gwen John – Dorelia in a Black Dress
- Edmund Leighton – Vox Populi ("'A little prince likely in time to bless a royal throne")
- Niels Moeller Lund – The Heart of the Empire
- Frederick McCubbin – The Pioneer (triptych)
- Herbert MacNair – The Gift of Doves
- Henri Matisse – Luxe, Calme et Volupté
- William Nicholson – portrait of J. M. Barrie
- Pablo Picasso
  - The Actor
  - Portrait of Suzanne Bloch
- Ilya Repin – Portrait of Leonid Nikolaievich Andreyev
- Franz Roubaud – The Siege of Sevastopol Panorama
- John Singer Sargent – Mrs Wertheimer
- Pavel Shtronda – Theotokos of Port Arthur
- Enrique Simonet – The Judgement of Paris
- Max Slevogt – Portrait of the Dancer Anna Pavlova
- Allen Butler Talcott – Lyme Meadow (approx. date)
- Viktor Vasnetsov – The Last Judgement (for St. George's Cathedral, Gus-Khrustalny, Russia)
- Maurice de Vlaminck – Sous bois

=== Photographs ===
- Edward Steichen
  - The Flatiron Building
  - The Pond—Moonlight

=== Sculptures ===
- Daniel Chester French
  - Colonel James Anderson Monument (Pittsburgh, Pennsylvania)
  - Statue of William Francis Bartlett (Massachusetts State House, Boston)
- Princess Louise, Duchess of Argyll – Memorial to Colonial soldiers who fell during the Boer War, in St Paul's Cathedral, London
- Hermon Atkins MacNeil – Coming of the White Man (Portland, Oregon)
- Rudolf and Wolfgang Siemering – Beethoven-Haydn-Mozart Memorial (Berlin)
- Antonio Sciortino – Les Gavroches

=== Stained-glass windows ===
- Tiffany Studio – Angel of the Resurrection

=== Architecture ===
- Larkin Administration Building, designed by Frank Lloyd Wright (demolished 1950)

== Exhibitions ==
- 12 April–14 July – "French Primitives", an exhibition of pre-Renaissance French art at the Louvre's Pavillon de Marsan and the Bibliothèque nationale de France in Paris.
- 9 May–4 June – Claude Monet, "Views of the Thames in London" at the Galeries Durand-Ruel in Paris.

== Births ==
=== January to June ===
- 8 January – Peter Arno, American cartoonist (d. 1968).
- 13 January – Oliver Messel, English stage designer (d. 1978).
- 14 January – Cecil Beaton, English photographer and stage and costume designer (d. 1980).
- 22 January – Kimon Evan Marengo, Egyptian-born British cartoonist (d. 1988).
- 6 February – Dorothy Canning Miller American curator (d. 2003).
- 22 February – Peter Hurd, American artist (d. 1984).
- 27 February - Yi Eungro, South korea Abstract artist (d.1989)
- 2 March – Theodor Seuss Geisel, American illustrator (d. 1991).
- 17 March – Chaim Gross, Austrian American sculptor (d. 1991).
- 31 March – Đorđe Andrejević Kun, Serbian painter (d. 1964).
- 4 April - Ulayu Pingwartok, Canadian Inuk artist
- 15 April
  - Mary Adshead, English painter (d. 1995).
  - Arshile Gorky, Armenian-born abstract expressionist painter (d. 1948).
- 21 April
  - Jean Hélion, French painter (d. 1987).
  - Gabriel Loire, French stained glass artist (d. 1996).
- 24 April – Willem de Kooning, Dutch abstract expressionist painter (d. 1997).
- 2 May – Bill Brandt, German-born British photographer and photojournalist (d. 1983).
- 11 May – Salvador Dalí, Spanish surrealist artist (d. 1989).
- 8 June – Alice Rahon, French-born Mexican surrealist poet and painter (d. 1987).
- 14 June – Margaret Bourke-White, American photographer and photojournalist (d. 1971).

=== July to December ===
- 18 July – Stella Skopal, Croatian sculptor (d. 1992)
- 2 August – Reg Parlett, English comics artist (d. 1991).
- 11 September – Daniel Brustlein, Alsatian-born illustrator (d. 1996).
- 23 October – Svetoslav Roerich, Russian painter (d. 1993).
- 3 November – Emerik Feješ, Hungarian and Serbian painter (d. 1969).
- 13 November – Stephen Bone, English painter (d. 1958).
- 17 November – Isamu Noguchi, Japanese American artist and landscape architect (d. 1988).
- 18 November – Jean Paul Lemieux, Canadian-American painter (d. 1990)
- 22 November – Miguel Covarrubias, Mexican caricaturist and painter (d. 1957).
- 30 November – Clyfford Still, American Abstract Expressionist painter (d. 1980).
- 11 December – Felix Nussbaum, German Jewish surrealist painter (k. 1944).
- 17 December – Paul Cadmus, American painter (d. 1999).
- 21 December – Jean René Bazaine, French painter, stained glass artist and writer (d. 2001).

=== Full date unknown ===
- Joseph Delaney, African American painter (d. 1991).
- Juan Bautista Garcia, Puerto Rican painter (d. 1974).

== Deaths ==
- January 8 – Alfred Felton, art collector (b. 1831)
- January 9 – Konrad Grob, painter (b. 1828)
- January 10 – Jean-Léon Gérôme, painter and sculptor (b. 1824)
- February 4 – Marie Firmin Bocourt, nature artist and engraver (b. 1819)
- May 6 – Franz von Lenbach, painter (b. 1836)
- May 8 – Eadweard Muybridge, photographer (b. 1830)
- June 20 – Frederic Sandys, painter (b. 1829)
- July 1 – George Frederic Watts, painter and sculptor (b. 1817)
- August 25 – Henri Fantin-Latour, painter and lithographer (b. 1836)
- September 3 – James Archer, portrait painter (b. 1823)
- September 4 – Martin Johnson Heade, painter (b. 1819)
- September 23
  - Émile Gallé, artist in glass (b. 1846)
  - George Anderson Lawson, sculptor (b. 1832)
- October 4 – Frédéric Bartholdi, sculptor (b. 1834)
- October 13 – Károly Lotz, painter (b. 1833)
- December 7 – Adolf Waldinger, painter from Osijek, Croatia (b. 1843)
- December 30 – John Horbury Hunt, architect (b. 1838)
- date unknown – Edwin Hayes, marine watercolourist (b. 1819)
