= Lady in Blue =

Lady in Blue may refer to:

- June Winters, American actress who performed as the children’s music character "Lady in Blue" on television, radio, and on dozens of albums from the 1940s into the 1960s. Her character "Lady in Blue" also had its own comic strip.
- Mary of Jesus of Ágreda, a Franciscan abbess and spiritual writer, popularly known as Lady in Blue and the Blue Nun, after the color of her order's habit
- Lady in Blue (Cézanne), a painting by Paul Cézanne
- Lady in Blue (album), album by Joe Dolan
  - "Lady in Blue" (Joe Dolan song), song by Joe Dolan, title track of similarly titled album, side A of his double-A sided single "Lady in Blue" / "My Darling Michelle"
- "Lady in Blue" (Tori Amos song), song by Tori Amos from her 2009 album Abnormally Attracted to Sin

== See also ==
- Woman in Blue, a portrait by Thomas Gainsborough
