= The Heart of the Empire =

Painting by Niels Møller Lund

The Heart of Empire
- Artist: Niels Møller Lund
- Year: 1904
- Medium: Oil on canvas
- Dimensions: 137 cm × 183 cm (54 in × 72 in)
- Location: Guildhall Art Gallery, London

The Heart of the Empire is a 1904 painting by Niels Møller Lund depicting the City of London from the roof of the Royal Exchange. It is held by the Guildhall Art Gallery.

== History and description ==
The painting was completed in 1904, later purchased for the Lord Mayor, William Treloar who bequethed it to Guildhall in 1923.

=== Interpretations ===
The painting depicts a scene of the City of London foregrounding the Bank Junction and with St Paul's Cathedral in the background. It has been interpreted to portray London deliberately as the centre of the Empire, adopting a particular representation of the city as the centre of world trade, at which Bank Junction and the surrounding financial institutions served as the very epicentre. This sentiment was common of the age, with Joseph Chamberlain describing the city as "the clearing house of the world". The use of St Paul's Cathedral, as well as church spires throughout, connects this financial capital with the historic and spiritual city.

=== Legacy ===
The painting was also brought up during debates of the redevelopment of a plot including the Mappin & Webb Building, the Gothic turret of which can be seen in the centre of the painting. Plans to develop it first unsuccessfully as Mansion House Square and later successfully as No. 1 Poultry and the surrounding public inquiries saw contentious debates. It became a cause célèbre between proponents of heritage conservation and those of modernism or the need to build anew to accommodate for growth. The painting had helped to establish the junction's reputation as a "national set piece". A painting of the same title depicting nearby Threadneedle Street by Frederic Marlett Bell-Smith was produced in 1909. Held by the Guildhall Art Gallery, the painting was put on display in 2023 as part of "The Big City", an exhibition by Guildhall.

== See also ==
- The Heart of the Empire (Bell-Smith)
