= Mansion House Square =

Proposed office development in London

- Artist's impression of how Mansion House Square would appear from the roof of the Royal Exchange overlooking Bank Junction

General information
- Status: Proposed
- Type: Office
- Location: City of London, United Kingdom
- Coordinates: 51.513195°N 0.090564°W

Height
- Height: 88.5 m (290 ft)

Design and construction
- Architect: Ludwig Mies van der Rohe

Mansion House Square was the name of a proposed office development that was to be built where Poultry and Queen Victoria Street meet in London, near Bank Junction. The building's modernist design, and the required demolition of a number of heritage structures would make it a contentious project, eventually denied planning following a publicised public inquiry. Designs were provided by Ludwig Mies van der Rohe, and the project was to be his only work in the United Kingdom.

== History ==
=== Background ===
The site was acquire by Rudolph Palumbo, father of Peter Palumbo, in 1958. In 1962, Peter commissioned Mies van der Rohe to produce a design for a public square and accompanying office block to be built on the site, in similar style to that of the Seagram Building. As it was his opportunity to build in the United Kingdom, he showed enthusiasm in his work, continuing to develop it until his death in 1969. The plans were filed in 1968, which the Court of Common Council agreed to in principle but could not grant official planning permission until the expiry of leases. There was also little public opposition, despite a public exhibition of the plans in October 1968. The Greater London Council's only suggestion was a limitation of 200ft to the height of the building.

=== Reception and public Inquiry ===
The last of the leases expired in 1982, when Palumbo would apply once again for planning permission. By now however, opposition to modernism and the growth of the conservation movement meant that opposition had stiffened. Pressure groups and conservation organisations opposed the building. The site occupied ten listed buildings including John Belcher's Mappin & Webb Building, and the Bank Conservation Area had been created in the intervening years, a "national set piece" which Mies's plans were seen to overshadow. In 1984, following a denial of Palumbo's planning application, he appealed and a public inquiry was launched. It became a cause célèbre between advocates of heritage conservation and modernists who saw such ideas as promoting stagnation. The public inquiry eventually ruled to deny planning permission on the grounds of aesthetic damage to the surrounding area, but did not rule out that a more "acceptable" future development might be allowed. Critics of Mansion House Square had included Martin Walker of The Guardian, Colin Amery of the Financial Times as well as Prince Charles, who described the designs as "yet another glass stump better suited to downtown Chicago than to the City of London".

=== Fate ===
In its place James Stirling's No. 1 Poultry was built following a second public inquiry. Prince Charles, once again resistant to the plans, described the building as "an old 1930s wireless". The eastern triangular plot, is occupied by the surviving listed offices at 1 Queen Victoria Street. The models of the Mies's plans were given to the RIBA by Palumbo for a temporary exhibition in 2017.

== Design ==
The site of the design included two triangular plots over Queen Victoria Street. Due to the presence of tunnels used by the London Underground, the area over the road itself could not support foundations for a highrise. As such, the tower would use the adequate space for a square plot on the west side, with the east to be a large public square. Its location would also preserve traditional view of St Paul's Cathedral.

The office building was to be a large bronze-clad, steel and glass tower, similar in design to Mies's Seagram Building. Plans show the building at 88.5 m (290 ft) in height, and variously quoted at 18 to 20 storeys.
