= Mappin & Webb Building =

Former building in London, England

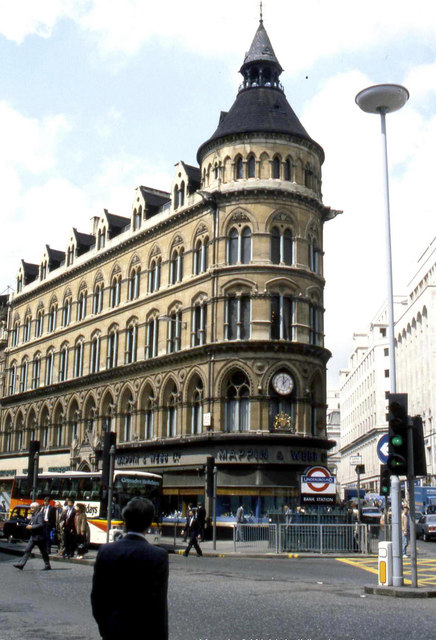
- The Mappin & Webb Building in 1993

General information
- Status: Demolished
- Type: Office
- Location: London, England
- Coordinates: 51.513321°N 0.090276°W
- Completed: 1871
- Destroyed: 1994

Design and construction
- Architect: John Belcher

The Mappin & Webb Building was a Grade II listed building that stood where Queen Victoria Street and Poultry meet near Bank Junction in the City of London from. It stood from its construction in 1871 to its demolition in 1994, alongside eight or nine other listed buildings to make way for the office building No. 1 Poultry. Of the buildings cleared to make way, it is often considered to be the most significant loss.

== History ==
=== Background ===
Mappin & Webb a jewellery company which traces its origins to 1775 in Sheffield as the Mappin Brothers. Their first London premises opened in 1845. This was followed by a location on Oxford Street, the first as Mappin & Webb, now known as Mappin House, in 1867.

=== Construction ===
The Mappin & Webb Building was designed for the company by John Belcher in a Franco-Flemish Gothic Revival style, with likely inspiration from the works of William Burges. and completed in 1871. It stood on a prominent triangular site with its turret facing towards Bank Junction. The ground floor was a branch of Mappin & Webb with a clientele of workers in the city, with offices for the jewellers as well as other tenants above. With changing consumer habits, the site began becoming obsolete.

=== Replacement ===
Plans to redevelop the site were first put forward in the 1960s, with Peter Palumbo, who had acquired the area in 1958, planning to commission Mies van der Rohe to provide a design. His Mansion House Square highrise would have been his only project in the United Kingdom, with design development continuing until the death of Mies in 1969.

Construction had to wait for leases to expire, construction was to begin by 1980s. During the 1982 unveiling of the project however, it faced significant opposition. Where the 1960s had seen a number of buildings of Victorian architecture demolished, public sentiment towards conservation had stiffened with the promotion of John Betjeman and the Victorian Society. The society, the London and Middlesex Archaeological Society and SAVE, as well as were among those pushing against the proposals. Mies's plans also saw opposition in the press, with Colin Amery of the Financial Times and Martin Walker of The Guardian among its critics. The development became a sort of battleground between the proponents of modernism and conservation. Following an appeal from Palumbo over the rejection of his planning proposal, a public inquiry was launched where the plans were again rejected on the grounds of overshadowing what was considered the "national set piece" of the Bank Junction area. Patrick Jenkin, Secretary of State for the Environment suggested a future more "acceptable" design could be allowed.

The Heart of the Empire by Niels Moeller Lund came to represent the significance the area. The Mappin & Webb building is prominently visible below St Paul's Cathedral.

A new design was provided instead by James Stirling, the eventual architect of No. 1 Poultry, first retaining the Mappin & Webb building, but with later plans deeming it uneconomical, with the deteriorated state of the building. The designs were once again rejected due to the demolition of heritage buildings, with the Mappin & Webb building among many listed buildings on the site, strengthened by their "group value". Once again an appeal by Palumbo followed, which launched the second public inquiry. The case became another significant cause of contention, and was considered a testing ground for conservation policy. Despite alternative plans proposed by Terry Farrell and promoted by SAVE, and the buildings position in the Bank Conservation Area, and Grade II listed status, Stirling's design went ahead with permission granted by Secretary of State Nicholas Ridley.

No 1. Poultry was Grade II* listed in 2016 by English Heritage, an organisation which had pushed against its construction during the public inquiries. It became the youngest building to gain such a distinction.

=== Surviving elements ===
During the building's demolition, a number of items were saved, including decorative elements, and the clock which was incorporated into No. 1 Poultry. The finial of the turret was preserved and reassembled in Farnsworth House, a Mies van der Rohe house owned by Palumbo, and later moved in 2003 to Palumbo's property Kentuck Knob, completed in 1956 to designs by Frank Lloyd Wright.
