= Niels Lund =

Niels Lund may refer to:

- Niels Moeller Lund, Danish artist
- Niels Tønder Lund, Danish zoologist
