= Colin Amery =

English writer and architectural historian

- Born: 29 May 1944; London
- Died: 11 August 2018 (aged 74)
- Education: King's College London; University of Sussex
- Occupations: Writer, architectural historian
- Notable work: The Rape of Britain (1975)

Colin Amery (29 May 1944 – 11 August 2018) was an English writer, architectural historian, and consultant for the Financial Times. He is known for his promotion of conservation, often listed alongside contemporaries Gavin Stamp, Mark Girouard and Dan Cruickshank as a generation of architectural conservationists active in the 1970s.

== Early life and education ==
Amery was born in London on 29 May 1944 to Kenneth and Florence Amery. He grew up in Winchmore Hill, attending Southgate County Grammar School. He studied Law before pivoting to architectural history, at King’s College London and the University of Sussex, and later became a Visiting Fellow of Jesus College, Cambridge.

== Career ==
Amery found his first role at the Town and Country Planning Association before becoming assistant editor at the Architectural Review, and between 1979 and 1999 as architectural consultant for the Financial Times. Amery also began authoring books on architecture and architectural history from the 1970s.

He also held a number of posts at various organisations. He was Director of the World Monument Fund in Britain, Director of Development for the Prince of Wales Institute of Architecture and made an honorary member of the Royal Institute of British Architects. As a trustee of the National Gallery he advised on the construction of the Sainsbury Wing. Amery was also a co-founder of the Spitalfields Historic Building Trust.

=== Conservation ===
He is known for campaigning against the redevelopment of cities around the United Kingdom that were destructive of heritage buildings. His 1975 book The Rape of Britain co-authored with Dan Cruickshank covers such a topic. As architectural consultant to the Financial Times, he also criticised Mansion House Square, a planned development in the City of London with designs Mies van der Rohe that would require the demolition of heritage structures including the Mappin & Webb Building. Despite such plans being rejected, No. 1 Poultry would be built on the site instead. Amery was also involved in activisim, partaking in sit-ins with fellow campaigners to preserve buildings faced with demolition. He contributed to the preservation of much of Spitalfieds' historic urban fabric.

With a personal interest in Edwin Lutyens, he also promoted the works and life of the architect in the public eye, contributing to a revival of interest in 1980s. Amery was a founding chairman of The Lutyens Trust.
