= Heinrich Feldman =

British property investor (1935–2022)

- Born: November 1935
- Died: 22 March 2022 (aged 86)
- Occupation: Property investor
- Spouse: Married
- Children: 8

Heinrich Feldman, also known as Harold Feldman or Chaim Moshe Feldman, (born November 1935 – 22 March 2022) was a British property investor. In 2022, his wealth was estimated at £360–800 million.

== Companies founded and owned ==
=== Inremco 26 ===
Inremco 26 is among the London-based property redevelopment and holding companies Feldman founded in 1983. In its financial year 2012–13, it had assets of £107,000,00000. The company bought 1 Poultry, in the City of London, for two million less than this sum in December 2010. The company sold the large block for a gross gain of £500 million to the private equity firm Perella Weinberg Partners in 2014.

=== Wade Properties ===
Wade Properties is Feldman's company having the same purposes based in Israel.

== Family trustee ==
Feldman was the main donor and indirect trustee of the Mazal Brocha Trust, belonging to his descendants, managed by Bank Leumi Overseas Trust Corporation, a Jersey company. In 2013, he directed the corporation sue its lawyers as to the mechanism used for certain Israeli property investments.
