= Maisons Jaoul =

Houses by Le Corbusier in Paris

Coordinates: 48.8800°N 2.2540°E

- Interactive map of the Maisons Jaoul area

General information
- Location: Paris, France, 83 Rue de Longchamp; Neuilly-sur-Seine
- Completed: 1954-56

Design and construction
- Architect: Le Corbusier

Maisons Jaoul are a pair of houses in the upmarket Paris suburb of Neuilly-sur-Seine, designed by Le Corbusier and built in 1954–56. They are among his most important post-war buildings and feature unpainted "béton brut" cast concrete and roughly detailed brickwork.

== History ==
The buildings were drawn in 1937 but were only built postwar for André Jaoul and his son Michel. They were for a time owned by English millionaire Peter Palumbo, Baron Palumbo. They now belong to two sisters who live there with their families. The Maisons Jaoul have been protected by the French government as historical monuments since 1966, at the request of André Malraux.

=== Design and construction ===
The son Michel (or Jacques Michel) Jaoul worked as an architect in Le Corbusier's office and in 1988 was in charge of the renovation of the houses. The construction of these vaulted houses signals a new trend in Le Corbusier's work, and the Maisons Jaoul can be considered his first "New Brutalist" work.

"...Shallow concrete vaults cast against a permanent framework of thin bricks set in place without the use of centering. These brick spans served as permanent molds for the shell concrete vaults cast in place on top of them. Tied with transverse steel rods, the vaults bear on continuous concrete beams that extend the length of each house at every floor. These beams in turn transfer the weight to load-bearing brick walls that enclose the houses on every side."

== See also ==
- List of Brutalist structures
