= Walbrook Club =

Dining club in London

Coordinates: 51.5126°N 0.0898°W

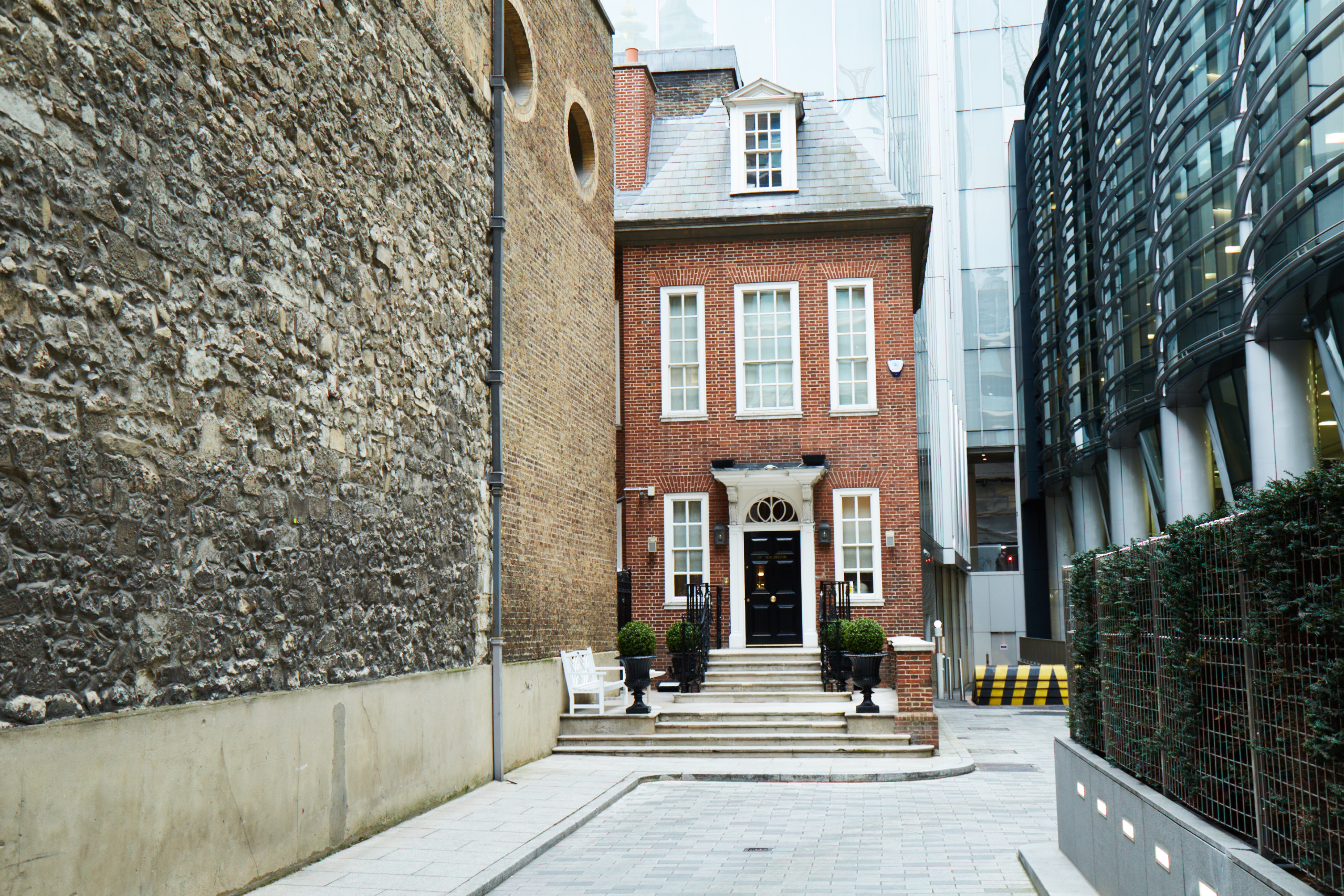
- The Walbrook Club in 2016
- Founded: 2000
- Location: 37a Walbrook, London EC4
- Website: walbrook-club.co.uk

The Walbrook Club is a members' club in the City of London, located near the Mansion House and Bank of England in the Ward of Walbrook.

A Queen Anne-style townhouse, adjacent to St Stephen's Church at the end of a private court next to Rothschild's UK offices and opposite Bloomberg European Headquarters, the Club comprises a bar, a dining room, as well as two smaller reception rooms.

== History ==
The Walkbrook Club occupies a townhouse, designed and built in the early 1950s by property developer Rudolph Palumbo to be a family office for his son, Peter Palumbo.

The club was established in 2000 by the late Mark Birley of Mark's Club, Annabel's and Harry's Bar. Its first chairman was merchant banker and philanthropist Rupert Hambro. Albert Roux of Le Gavroche ran the kitchens.

In 2018, Lord Palumbo's younger son, Philip Palumbo took over management of the Club.

== See also ==
- City of London Club
