= The Heart of the Empire (Bell-Smith) =

Painting by Frederic Marlett Bell-Smith

- Artist: Frederic Marlett Bell-Smith
- Year: 1904
- Type: Watercolour, landscape painting
- Dimensions: 57.2 cm × 89 cm (22.5 in × 35 in)
- Location: Museum of Vancouver

The Heart of the Empire is a 1909 painting by the Anglo-Canadian artist Frederic Marlett Bell-Smith depicting the Royal Exchange as seen from across Bank Junction in the City of London. It is held by the Museum of Vancouver.

== History and description ==
The painting shares a name with a 1904 painting by Niels Moeller Lund, with the title likely derived from Lund's notion of the financial institutions surrounding Bank Junction serving as the centre of world trade. Bell-Smith's painting similarly reads as an image of the importance of the imperial core but takes a more intimate view of the streets. The composition potentially reflects the more human aspect and connections of empire, with Bell-Smith himself a product of it, having moved from England to Canada in 1866.

Bell-Smith, primarily a landscape painter, struggled in his earlier years to produce urban scenes. Compared to earlier works, he was able to better render figures and objects. The painting was bought in 1910 for $500 Canadian by the Studio Club with the intention of providing it as the first painting in the collection of a proposed Vancouver art gallery.

== See also ==
- The Heart of the Empire
