= No 1 Poultry =

Office building in the City of London

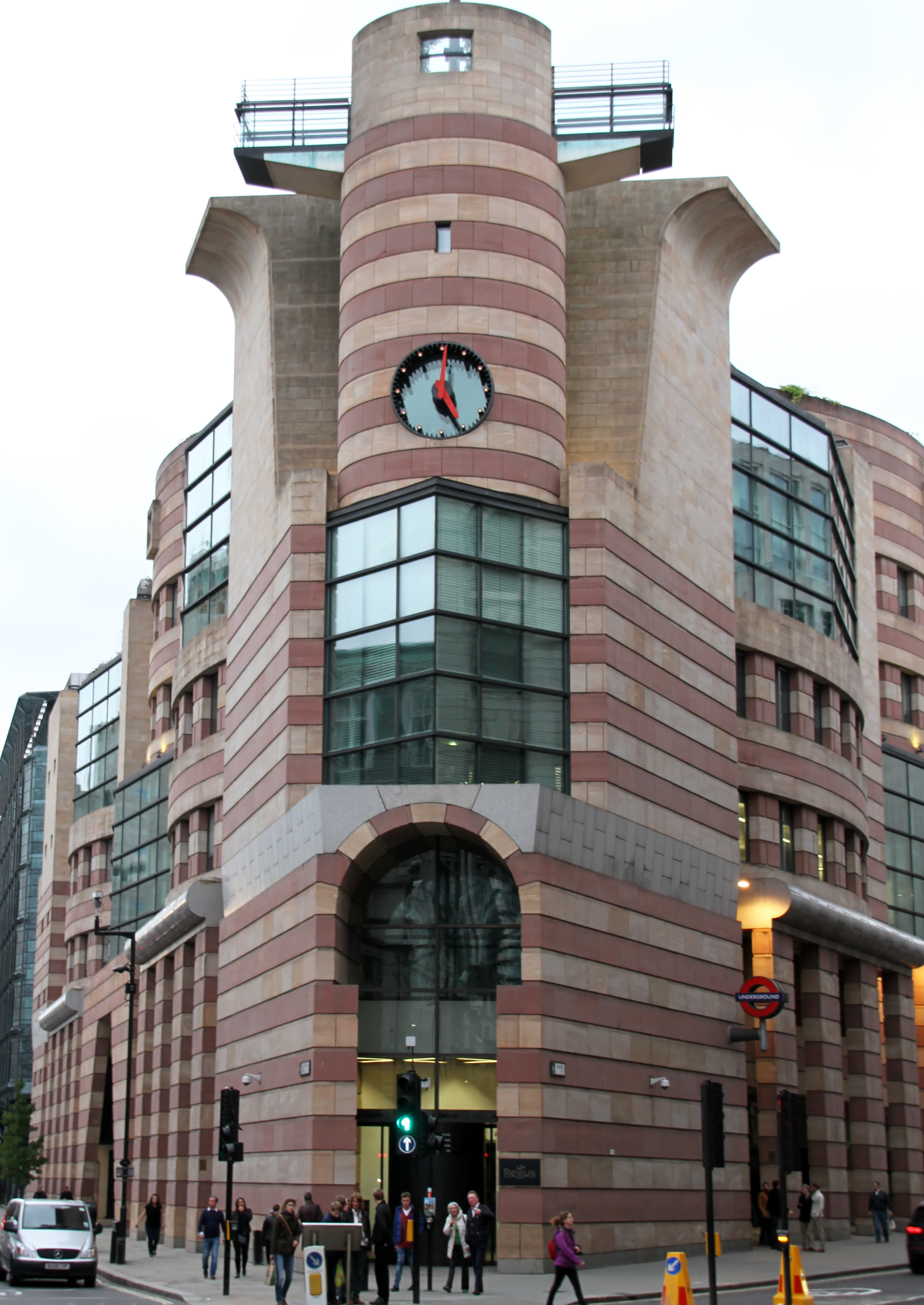
- The building pictured from Mansion House Street in 2014

General information
- Architectural style: Postmodernist
- Location: Poultry, London, England
- Coordinates: 51°30′48″N 0°05′27″W
- Year built: 1994–1997; 29 years ago

Design and construction
- Architect: James Stirling (completed posthumously by Michael Wilford)

Listed Building – Grade II*
- Official name: No.1 Poultry
- Designated: 28 November 2016
- Reference no.: 1428881

No 1 Poultry (Note: Spoken as number one Poultry) is a commercial building in the City of London, used for offices and retail. It occupies the apex where the eastern ends of Poultry and Queen Victoria Street meet at Mansion House Street, the western approach to Bank junction.

The design, by James Stirling, was constructed after the architect's death. It replaced the Mappin & Webb building, a neo-Gothic, conical-turreted, Grade II-listed retail building owned by developer Rudolph Palumbo and later by his son, Peter Palumbo. An alternative scheme, a modernist tower by Ludwig Mies van der Rohe in the manner of the Seagram Building in New York City, was abandoned after a high-profile architectural and planning dispute in the 1980s. The eventual postmodern design, with its alternating bands of rose-pink and muted yellow stone, was approved. As before, the apex carries a clock face, now positioned higher above a large pointed arrangement of thirty window panes.

In 2016, the landowner proposed exterior alterations. Building users, neighbours and architectural experts urged Historic England to recognise and protect the building, and it was listed at Grade II*, making it, at the time, the youngest building in England to receive that designation.

== Overview ==
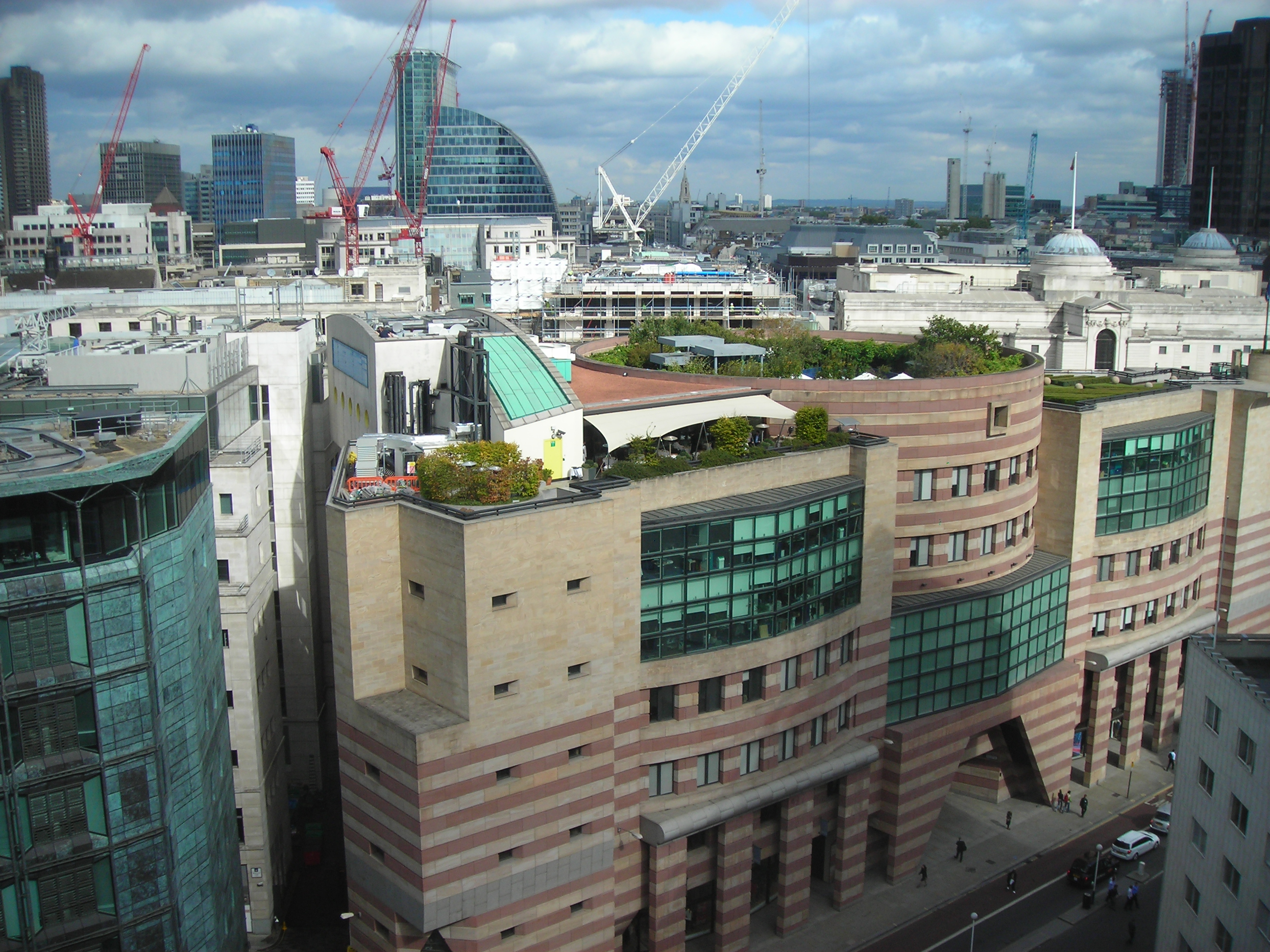
Coq d'Argent restaurant on the roof of No 1 Poultry

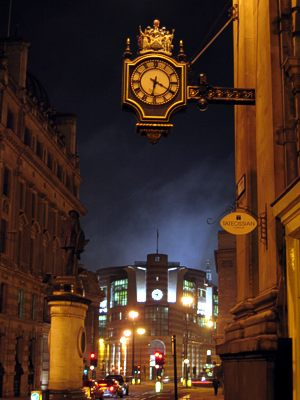
Night-time view, from street facing the apex of the building, Cornhill

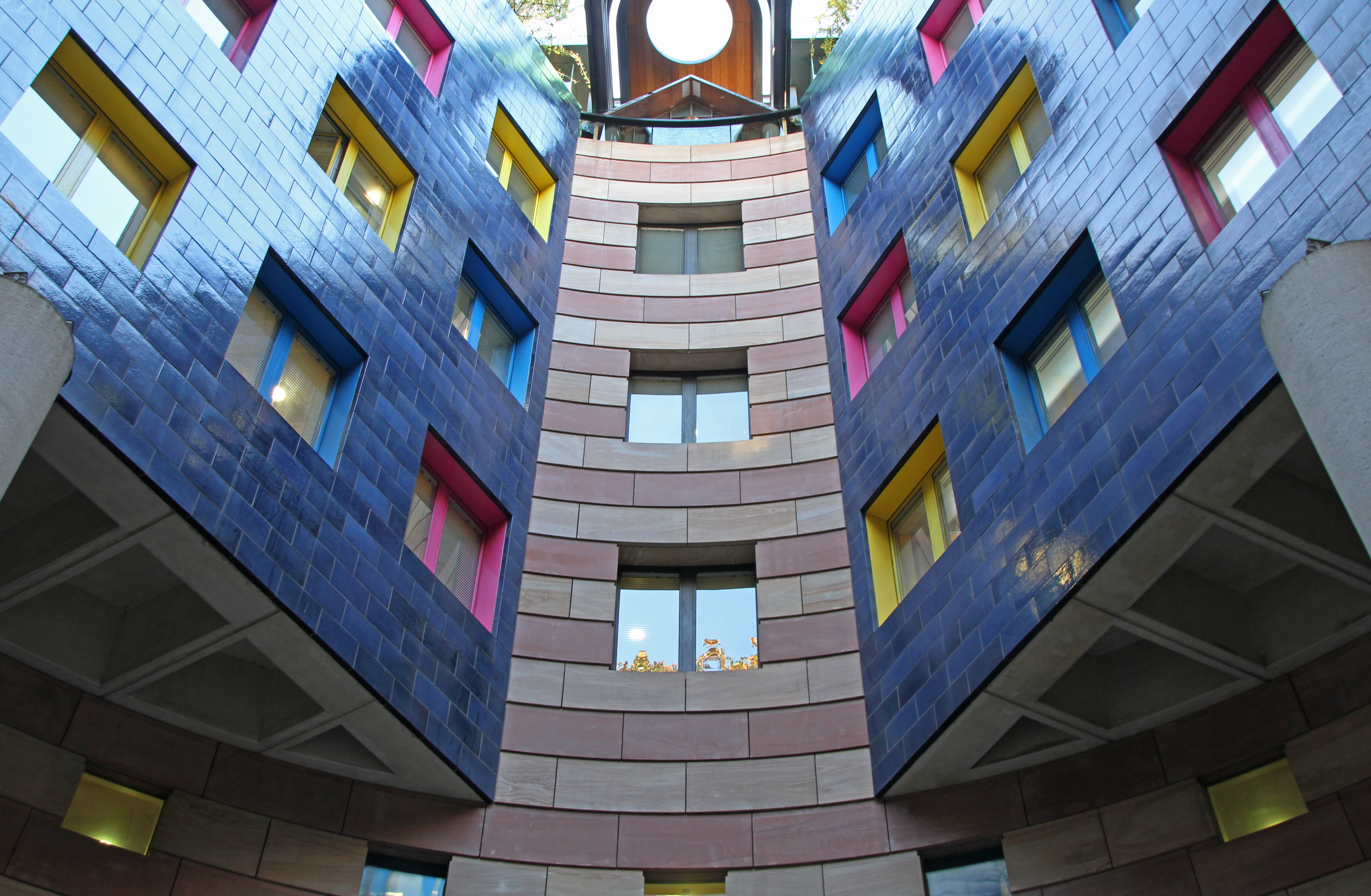
Interior atrium windows

The present building was completed in 1997, five years after James Stirling's death and three years after construction began. It is a postmodern structure, employing bold forms and strong colour contrasts in a compact composition. The exterior is clad in alternating bands of pink and yellow limestone, with voussoirs framing the apex arch, while the courtyard atrium displays some of Stirling's characteristic use of vivid colour. Bucklersbury Passage runs through the building, linking the courtyard to Poultry on the north and Queen Victoria Street on the south.

Like many postmodern buildings, its imagery incorporates a range of architectural references. From the sharp apex of the site, a keyhole-shaped opening leads to a little-used Scala Regia with a ramped floor, gold-leafed terminus and an ancient Egyptian-influenced character; intended as Peter Palumbo's private entrance, it saw limited use after he sold the development before completion. The turret above has been likened to a submarine conning tower, while the glazed, two-sided clock recalls the Art Deco Palazzo delle Poste in Naples.

Completed nearly two decades after the first designs were published, the building attracted mixed responses from critics at a time when postmodernism had waned in influence. In a reader poll by Time Out magazine, it was voted the fifth-worst building in London.

Following an application for exterior alterations, and with support from neighbours, building users and architectural specialists, the structure was listed at Grade II* on 28 November 2016. (Note: By the statutory holder of this function, Historic England) The Twentieth Century Society was the principal advocate for listing, opposing the proposed redesign; the landowner was the main objector.

== Construction ==
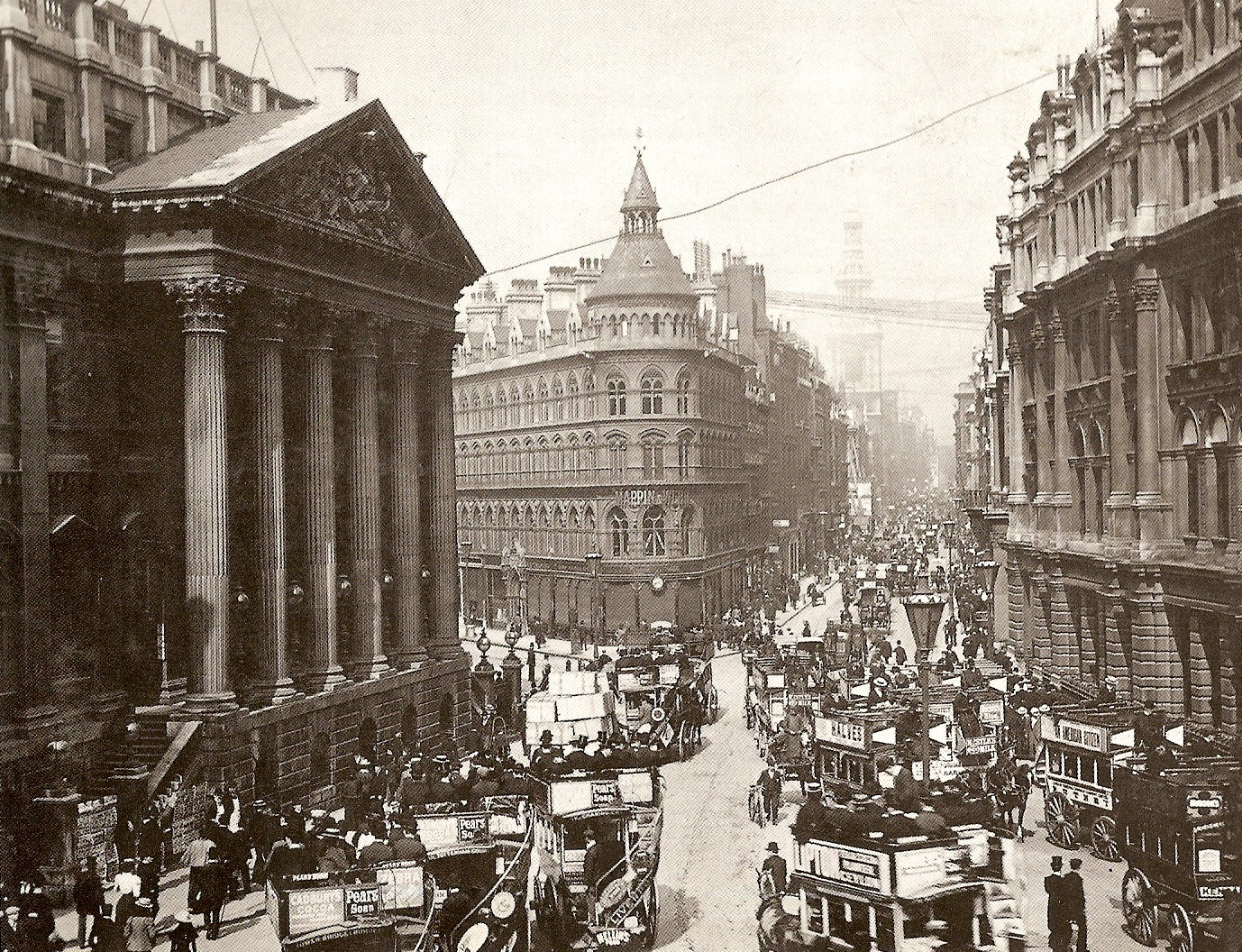
The Mappin & Webb building by John Belcher in the centre of a picture taken c. 1902

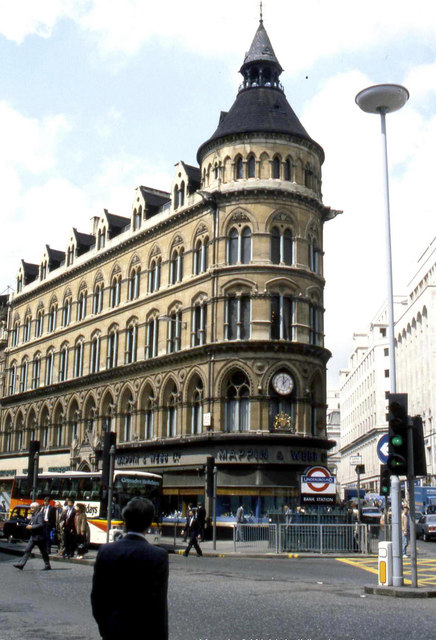
The Mappin & Webb building in 1993, which was demolished to make way for No 1 Poultry

At the apex facing Mansion House, within a conservation area, redevelopment attracted significant opposition, particularly as the site was then occupied by a repairable 19th‑century neo-Gothic Grade II-listed building designed by John Belcher in 1870 and used by crown jewellers Mappin and Webb.

In 1969, a modernist office building and public plaza by Mies van der Rohe, proposed as Mansion House Square, was put forward for the site. The scheme became the subject of a prolonged architectural and planning dispute, later referenced by Prince Charles in his 1984 "carbuncle" speech to the RIBA, in which he criticised it as "yet another giant glass stump, better suited to downtown Chicago than the City of London". The plans were ultimately abandoned.

A major archaeological excavation was subsequently undertaken by the Museum of London Archaeology Service, directed by Peter Rowsome. The dig produced significant findings, including a wooden drain running alongside the main Roman road. Dendrochronology dated the timber to 47 CE, demonstrating that Roman Londinium had developed in this part of the city by that time.

Construction of the present building was completed in 1997, incorporating several smaller buildings to the east.

== Use ==
No 1 Poultry comprises a mix of retail and office space. A restaurant occupies the rooftop, with a terrace and formal garden offering wide City views for diners and drinkers. The building featured in the opening ceremony of the 2012 Olympic Games in the segment 'Happy and Glorious' in which Daniel Craig (as James Bond) escorted Queen Elizabeth II to the Olympic Stadium by helicopter.

The terrace, which has a drop of around 80 feet (24 m), has gained notoriety for being the location of six suicides: in 2007, 2009, twice in 2012, in 2015, and in 2016.

== Owners ==
For four years the building was owned by a Heinrich Feldman company – selling it to Perella Weinberg Partners for £110 million, a 4.8% gain, in 2014. It sold again in 2018 to Hana Alternative Asset Management for £185 million.

== See also ==
- Grade II* listed buildings in the City of London

== References, footnotes and sources ==
Footnotes

Sources

- Rowsome, Peter. Heart of the City (Museum of London, 2000)
