= John Belcher (architect) =

English architect

John Belcher FRIBA RA
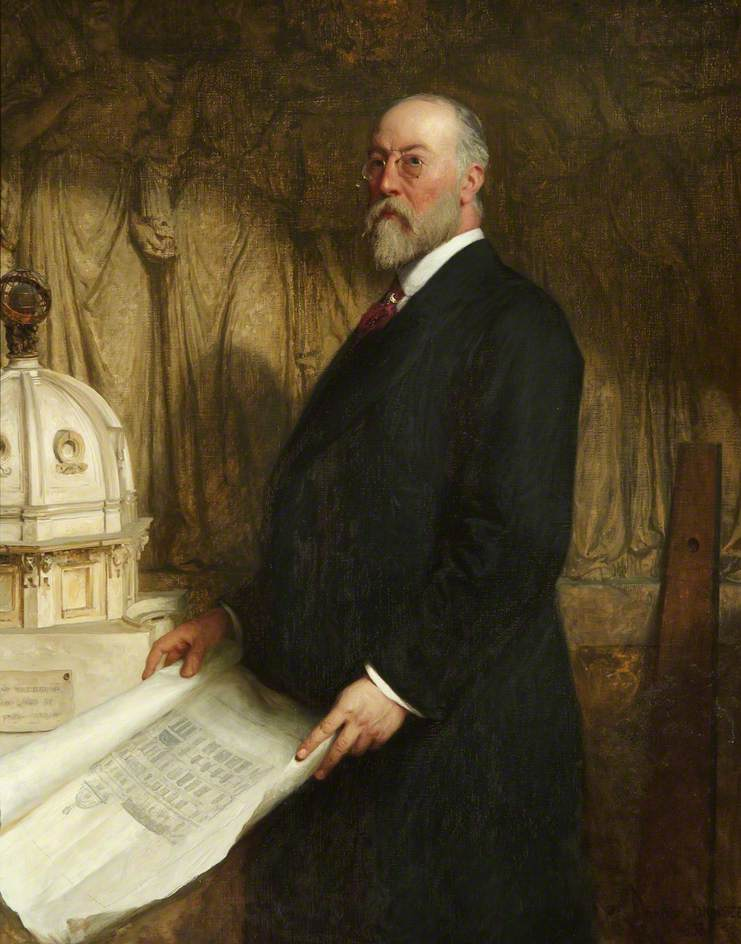
- Belcher c.1906 by Frank Dicksee, with sculpture by Hamo Thornycroft
- Born: 10 July 1841; Southwark, London, England
- Died: 8 November 1913; Camberwell, London, England
- Occupation: Architect
- Awards: Royal Gold Medal (1907)
- Buildings: Ashton Memorial

John Belcher (10 July 1841 – 8 November 1913) was an English architect, and president of the Royal Institute of British Architects.

He designed Chartered Accountants Hall (1890), one of the first neo-baroque buildings in London, and many of his later commissions are prime examples of lavish Edwardian municipal architecture. He was also known as a singer, cello player and conductor.

== Early life ==
Belcher was born in Southwark, London on 10 July 1841. His father (1816–1890) of the same name was an established architect. They lived at 60 Trinity Church Square from 1849 to 1852. They had previously lived nearby at 3 Montague Terrace (now 8 Brockham Street), where Belcher was born in 1841. The son was articled with his father, spending two years in France from 1862, where he studied contemporary architecture, apparently more concerned with that promoted by Baron Haussman and Emperor Napoleon III than historic buildings.

== Career ==
In 1865, Belcher was made a partner with his father, who retired in 1875. He was chairman of the first meeting of the Art Workers' Guild in 1884.

His first work to be built was in the City of London, the 1865 Royal Insurance building in a French Renaissance style (razed 1913). Also in London, he designed the 1870 Mappin & Webb building in Gothic style on the corner of Queen Victoria Street and Poultry (demolished in 1994 after a protracted controversy and public inquiry, and replaced with the No 1 Poultry building), and was joint architect, with his partner John James Joass, of Whiteleys department store.

In 1890, he designed Chartered Accountants Hall for the Institute of Chartered Accountants, which was one of the first neo-baroque buildings in the City of London, where banks and commercial concerns had previously preferred a more sober classicism. It featured extensive sculptural work by Sir Hamo Thornycroft, Harry Bates and others, consisting of several high-relief panels as well as stand-alone statues. In 1900, again with Joass, he designed Electra House, also in the City.

Belcher's major commissions outside London include Colchester Town Hall (1898–1902) and the Ashton Memorial, designed and built 1906–1909 in Lancaster. Both of these are in the Baroque style, typical of the lavish creations of the Edwardian era.

Other works include: Southwark Church, Camberwell New Road, 1877 – now the Greek orthodox Cathedral; Cottage Hospital, Norwood, 1881; Redholm, Champion Hill, Dulwich, 1885 (for himself); Yeldall Manor, Hare Hatch, Berkshire; Château Mauricien, Wimereux, France, 1897 (Belcher's only known building on the continent); Birmingham Daily Post Building, Fleet St, London 1902; Guildown Grange, Guildford, Surrey, 1902; Tapeley Park, Devon, reconstruction 1902; Cornbury Park, Oxfordshire, extension, 1902–3; Royal London Friendly Society, Finsbury Square, London, 1904–5.

From 1905, John James Joass took over more of the design in the practice and together they built Royal Insurance, St. James's Street & Piccadilly, London, 1907–9; Headquarters of the Royal Zoological Society, Regent's Park, London, 1910–11; Holy Trinity, Kingsway, London 1910–12; Royal Society of Medicine, Henrietta Street, London, 1910–12; Tatmore Place, Hitchin, Hertfordshire, 1910; and Mappin Terraces, Zoological Gardens, London, 1913.

Belcher served as president of the Royal Institute of British Architects from 1904 to 1906. In 1907 he won the Royal Gold Medal. During his time as president he was asked to judge the competition for the design of Hove's new public library, which had attracted 71 entrants: from a shortlist of ten he chose the design of Percy Robinson and W. Alban Jones.

Belcher was also chief architect for the 1908 Franco-British exhibition at White City, London. He was elected Royal Academician in 1909. Russia, Belgium, Germany, Spain and the United States elected him a member of their several architectural societies. In 1907, he published Essentials in Architecture: An Analysis of the Principles & Qualities to be Looked for in Architecture.

Architects associated with Belcher's practice include Arthur Beresford Pite and Philip Mainwaring Johnston.

== Personal life ==
A deeply religious man, he was a prominent member of the Catholic Apostolic Church and wrote The History of the Ecclesiastical Movement (1872) and A Report on the Position of Organs in Churches (1892). He was an Angel (priest) at the Southwark Church in Camberwell from 1908 until his death. He was known to the public as an accomplished solo bass singer, cello player and conductor.

== Death and legacy ==
Belcher died at Champion Hill, Dulwich on 8 November 1913 and is buried at West Norwood Cemetery. After his death, the practice was taken over by John James Joass, his partner since 1905.

== Gallery of work ==
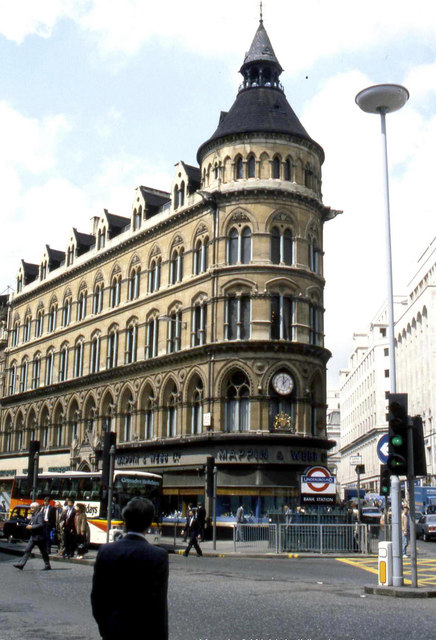
The Mappin and Webb building, London (demolished in the early 1990s and replaced by No 1 Poultry)

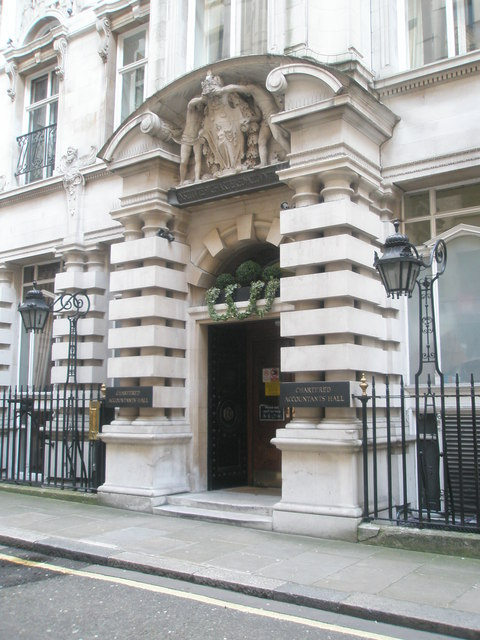
Entrance to Chartered Accountants' Hall

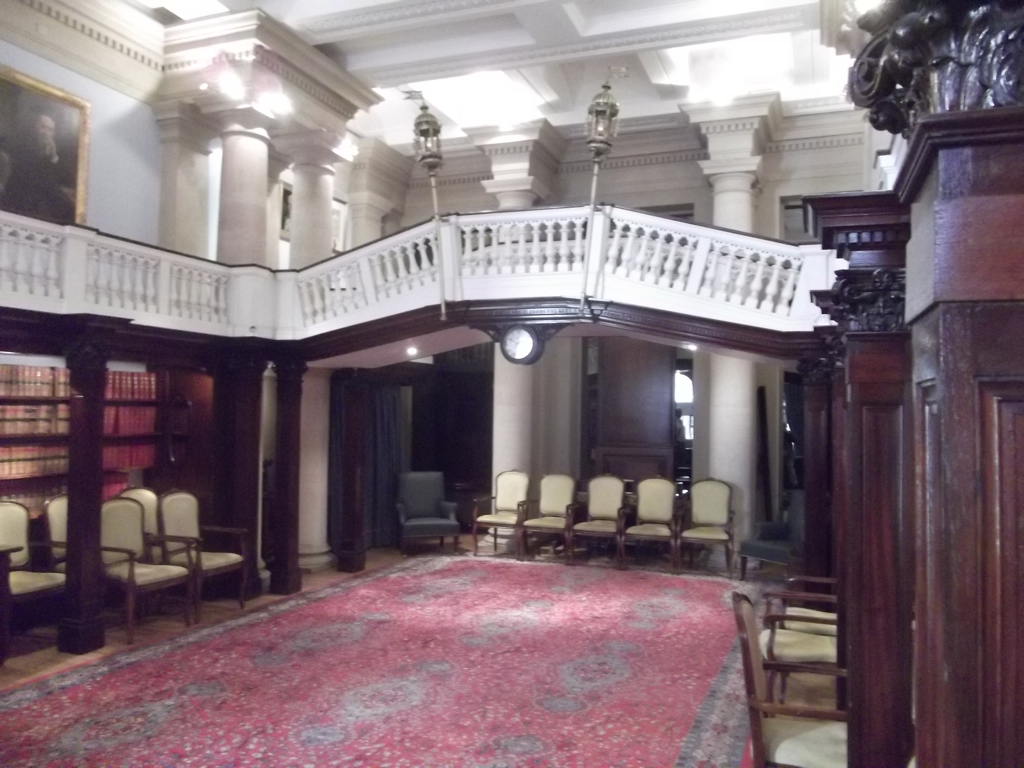
Library, Chartered Accountants' Hall

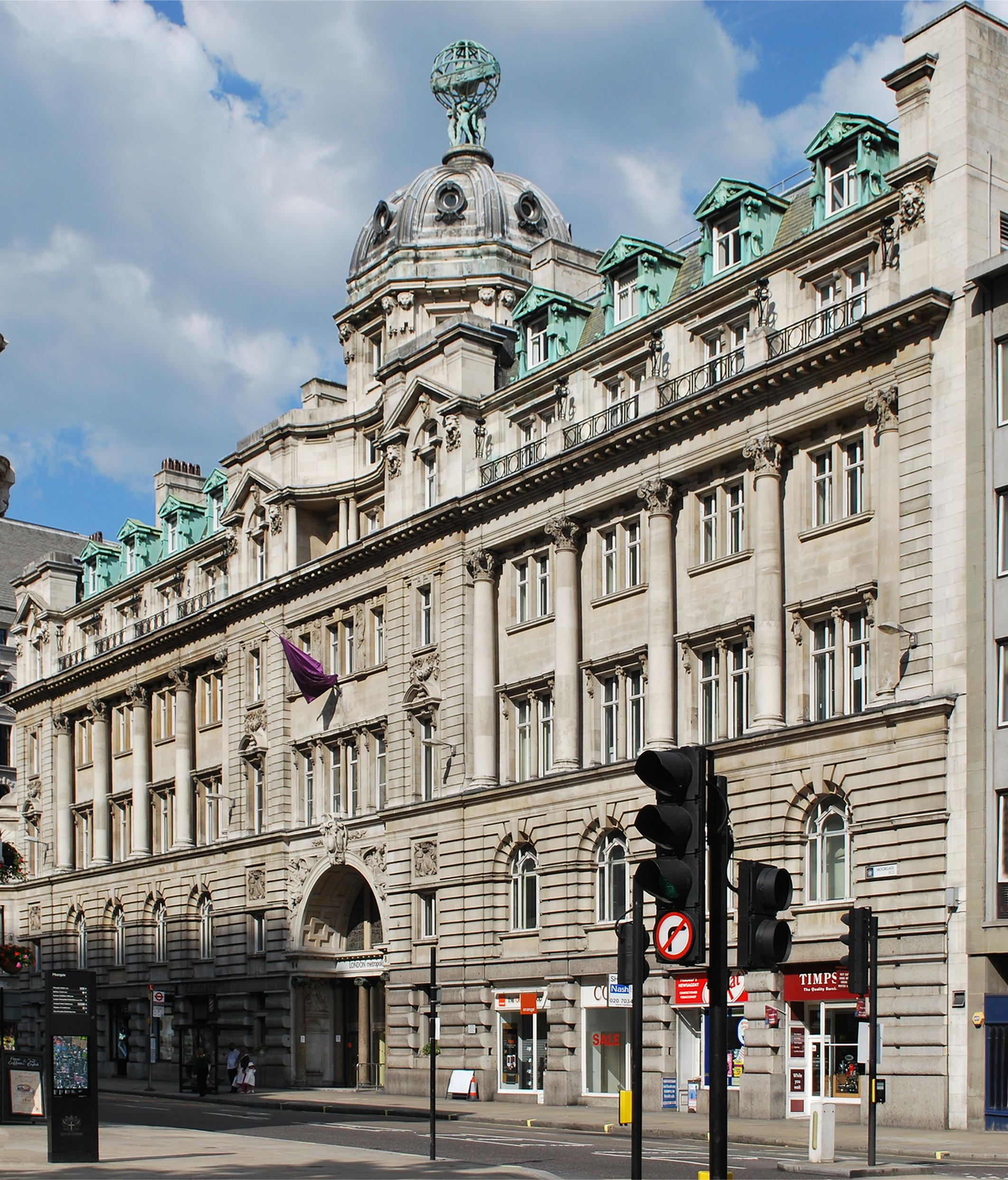
Electra House, London

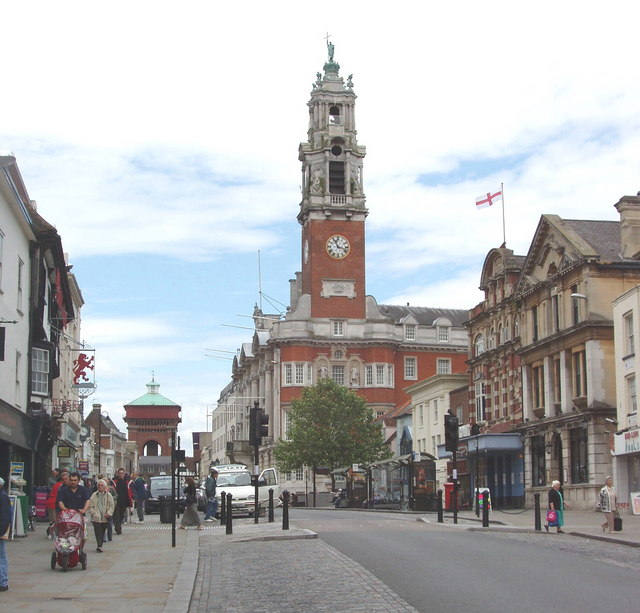
Town Hall, Colchester, Essex

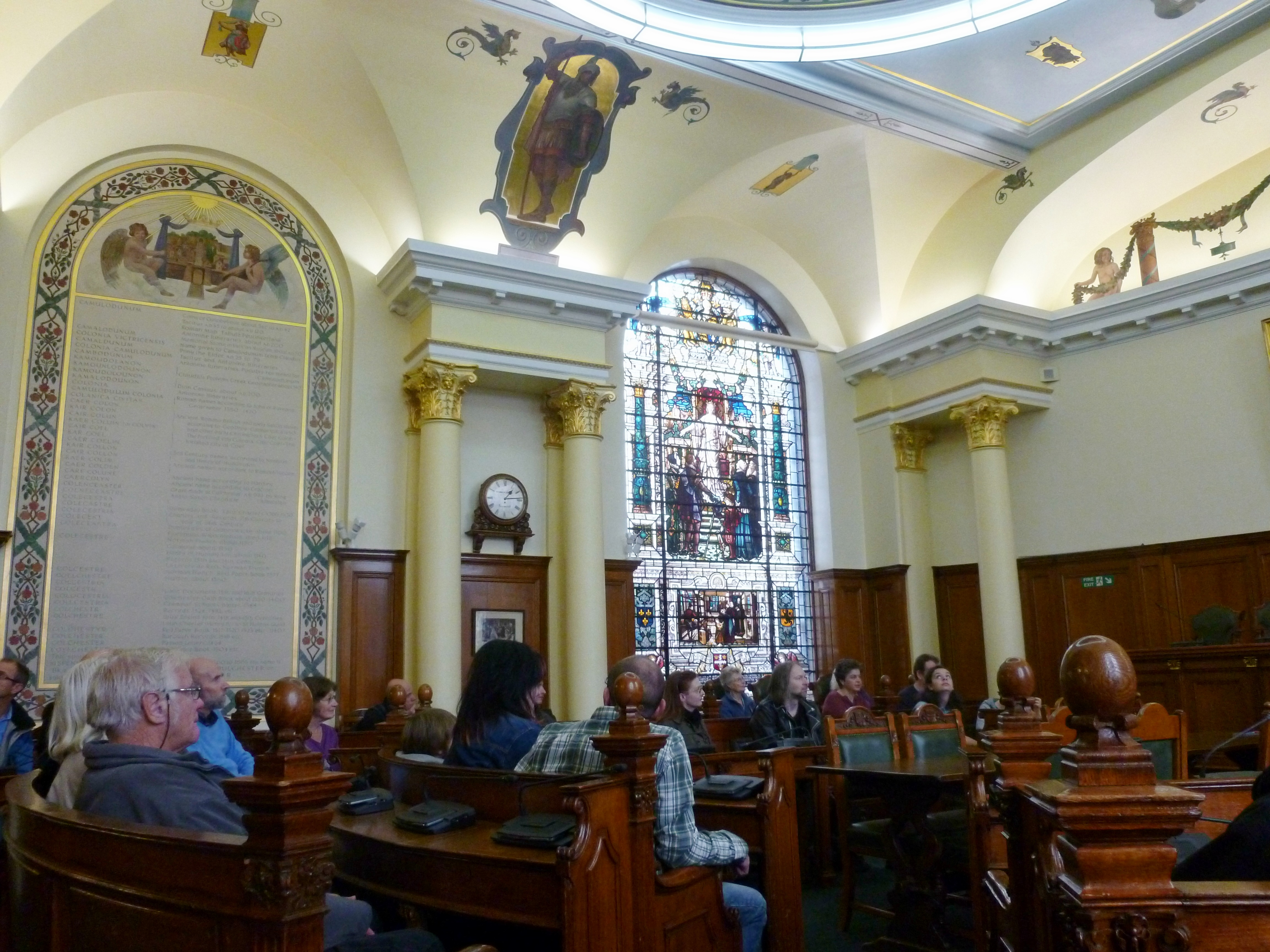
Council Chamber, Colchester Town Hall

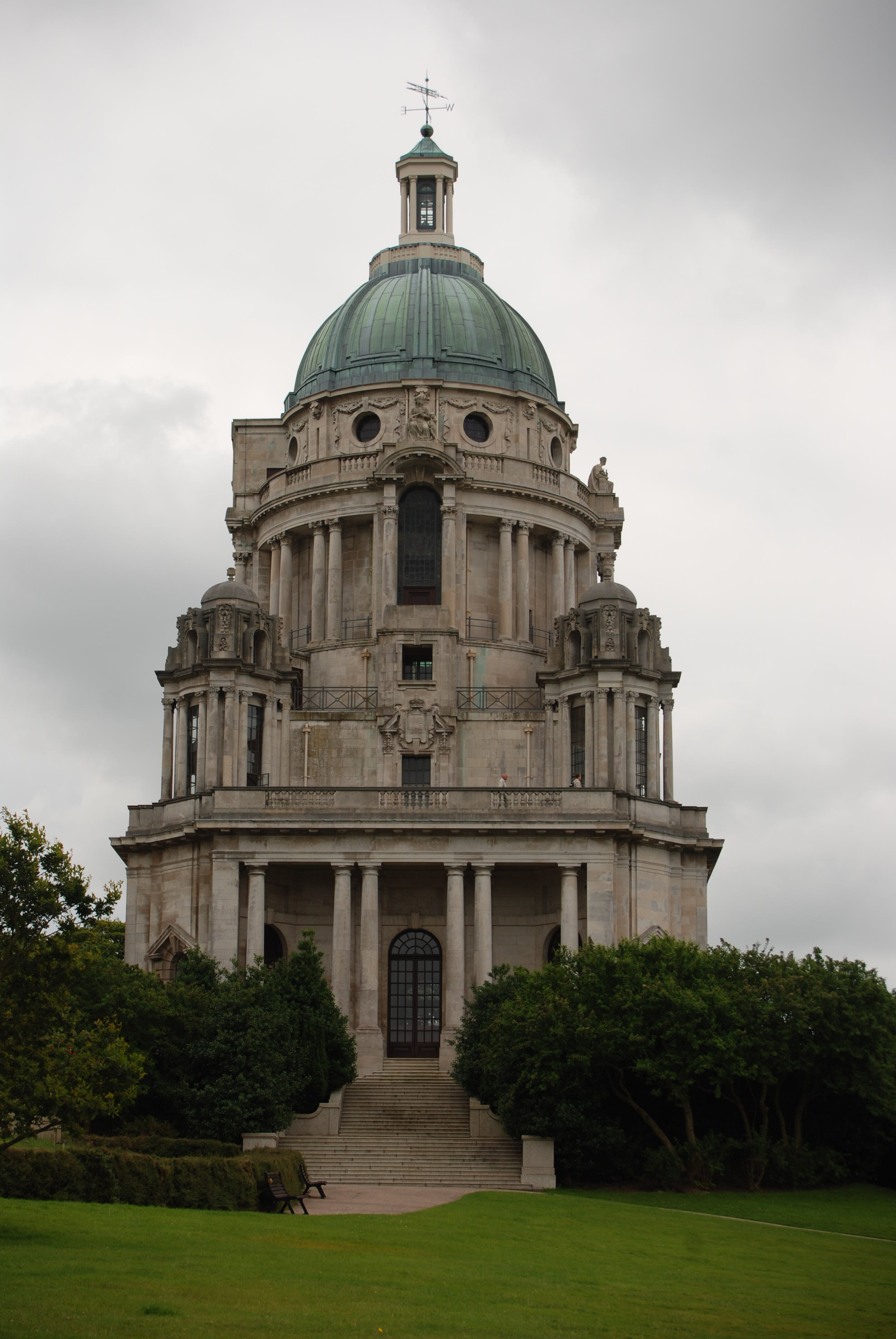
Ashton Memorial, Lancaster, north front, erected by James Williamson, 1st Baron Ashton

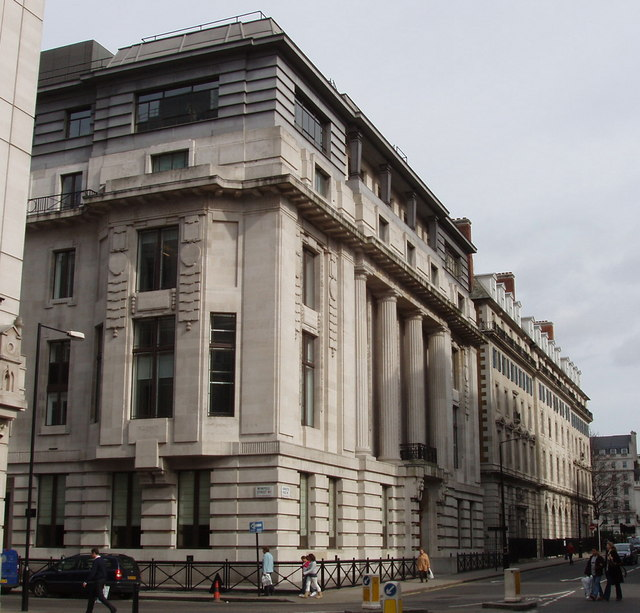
The Royal Society of Medicine

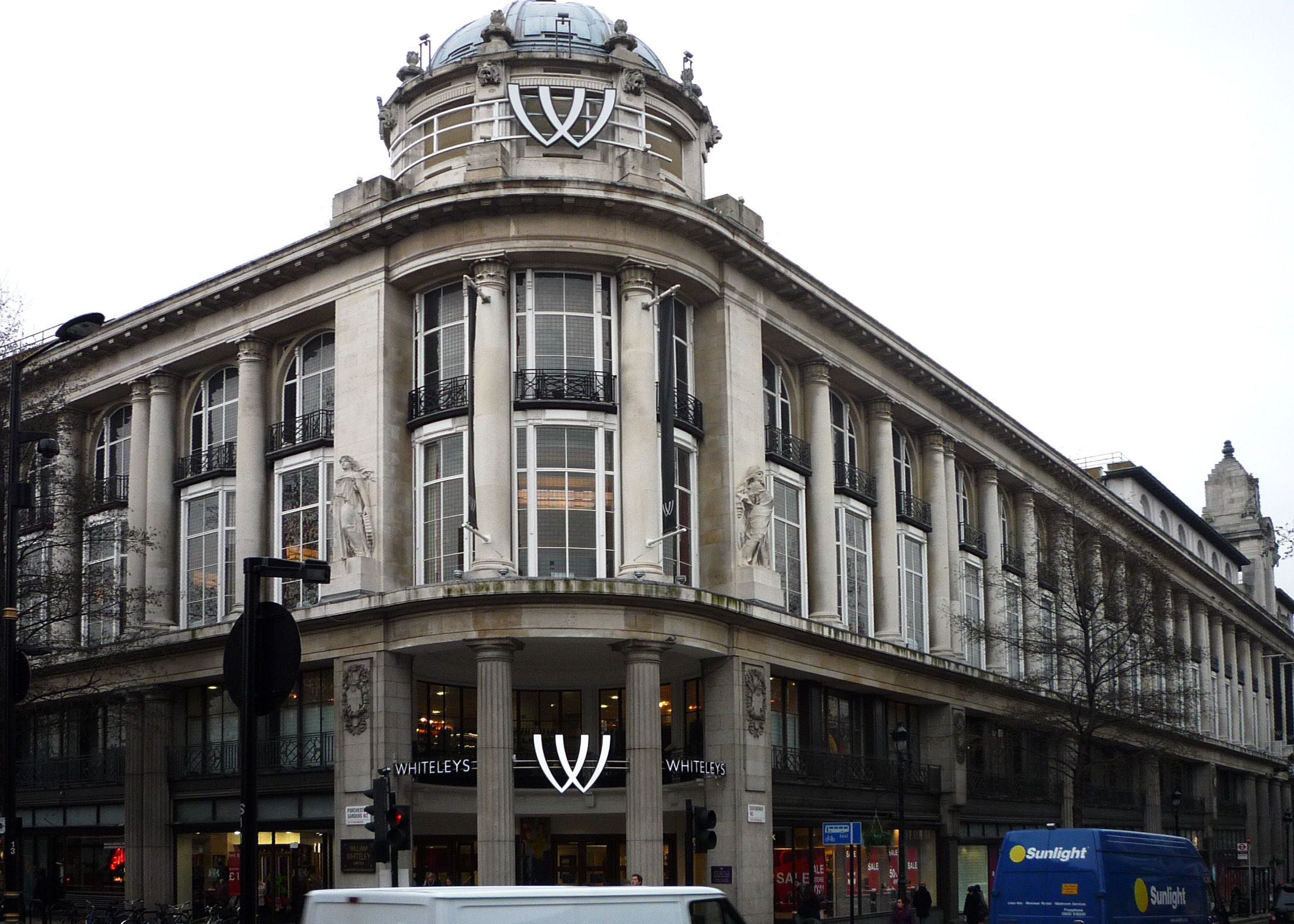
Former Whiteleys department store, now mall, Bayswater, London

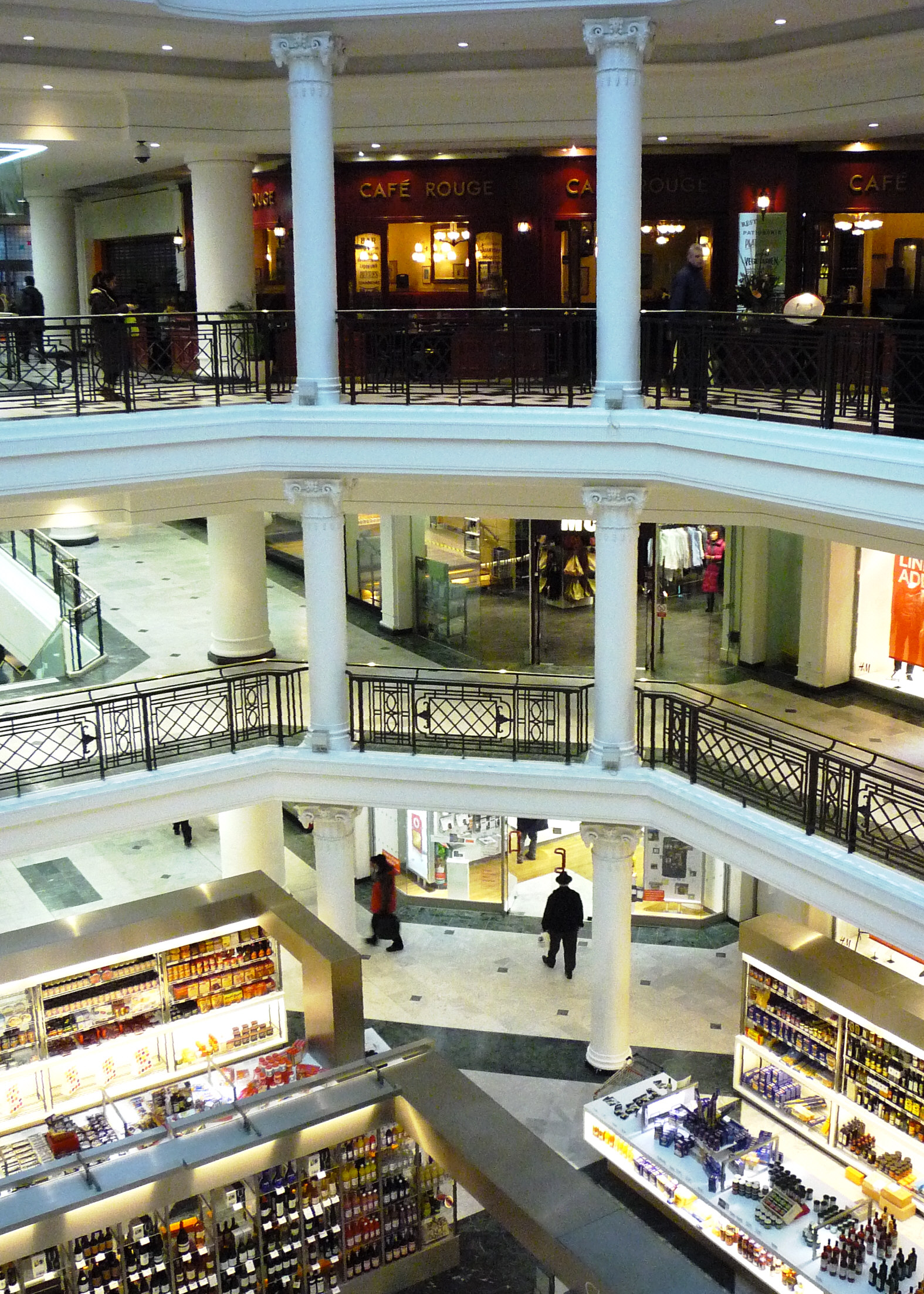
Interior of former Whiteleys store

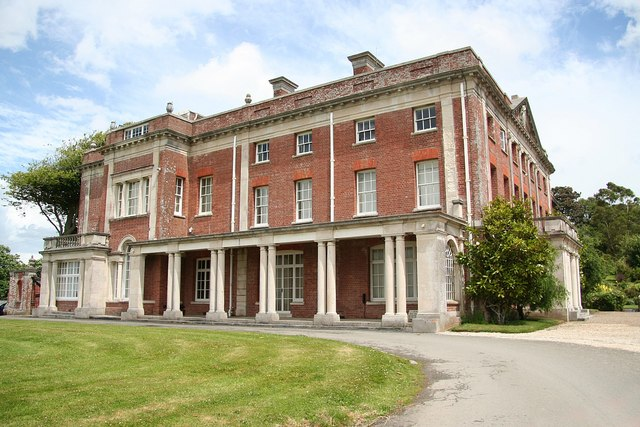
Tapeley Park, Devon

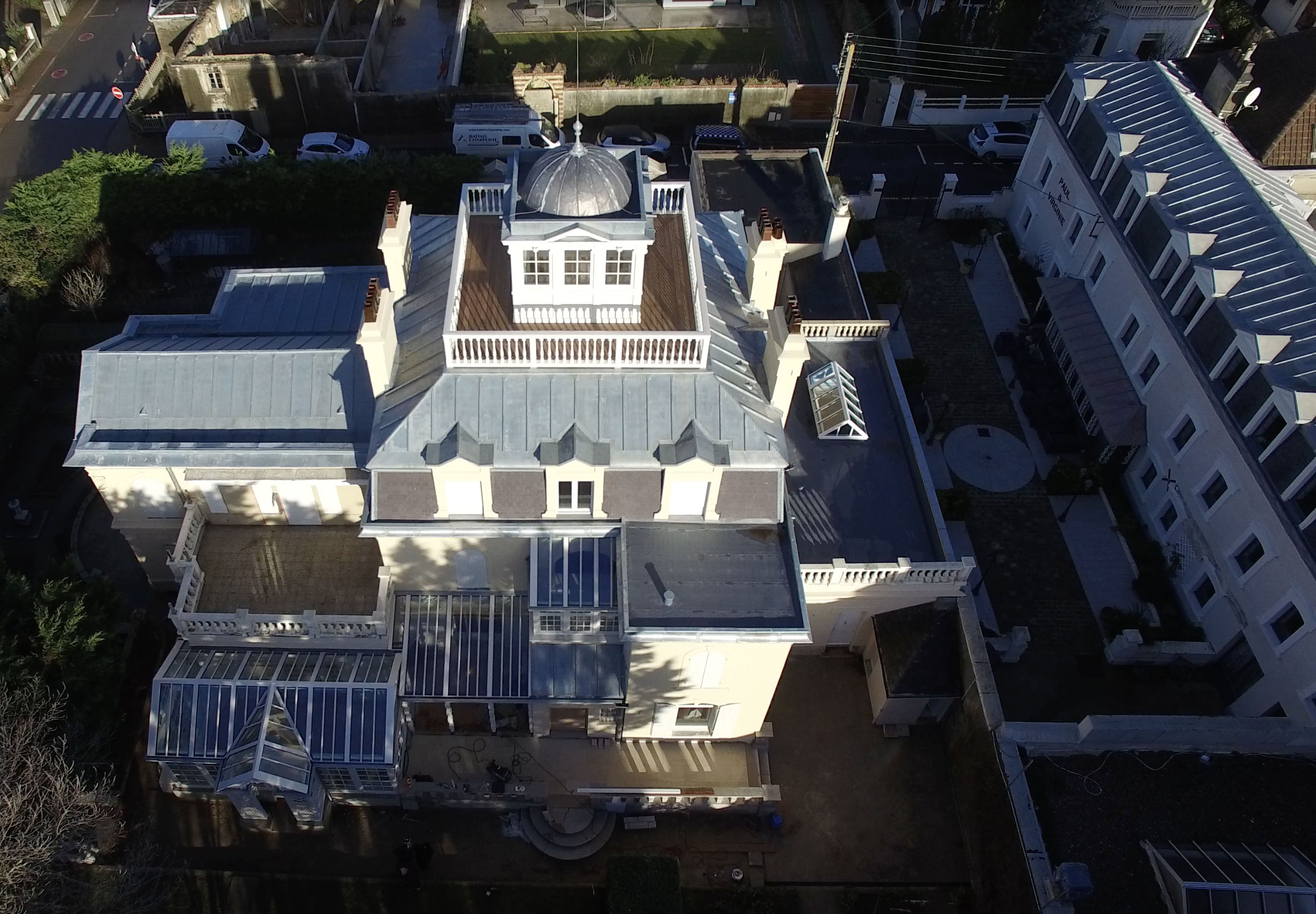
Château Mauricien, Wimereux, in 2018 just after restoration
