= Woman in Blue =

c. 1770s painting by Thomas Gainsborough

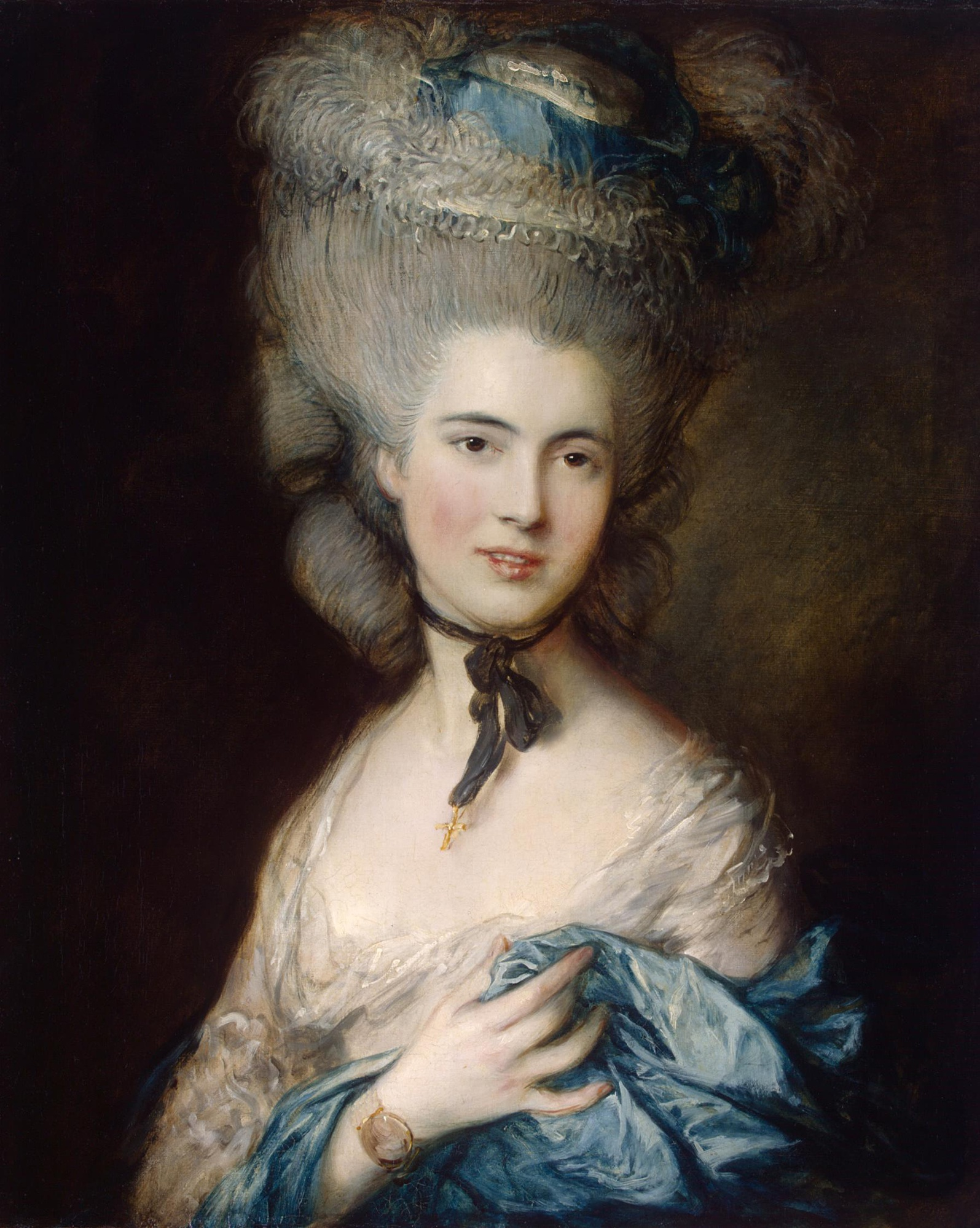
- Artist: Thomas Gainsborough
- Year: c. 1775–1785
- Medium: Oil on canvas
- Dimensions: 76.5 cm × 63.5 cm (30.1 in × 25.0 in)
- Location: Hermitage Museum; Saint Petersburg

The Portrait of a Lady in Blue, or Woman in Blue, is an oil-on-canvas portrait by English artist Thomas Gainsborough, from c. 1775-1785. It is held in the Hermitage Museum, in Saint Petersburg, to which it was left in 1916 by Alexei Khitrovo, making it Gainsborough's only work in Russia.

== History and description ==
It was created during Gainsborough's fifteen-year stay in Bath, Somerset. Some art historians have identified its subject as Elizabeth, Duchess of Beaufort, daughter of Edward Boscawen. The Hermitage Museum also identified the woman as the Duchess of Beaufort.

The painting is a bust length portrait. It depicts the woman wearing a white dress and a light-colored hat with ostrich feathers and light blue ribbons on her powdered hair, piled high, as she is turned slightly to the left. She wears in her neck a black ribbon tied in a bow under her chin, from which hangs a gold cross. Her right hand, holding a bracelet adorned with a cameo, holds a light blue scarf across her chest.

Woman in Blue is an example of the elegant female portraits by the artist, where he distances himself from the prevailing pretentious artificiality of his time. The lady in this portrait, for example, despite being elegantly dressed, is not constricted in a tight corset, and her smile is neither fake nor coquettish; she seems genuine and natural.
