= Peter Palumbo, Baron Palumbo =

British politician, art collector, property developer and nobleman (born 1935)

The Right Honourable The Lord Palumbo
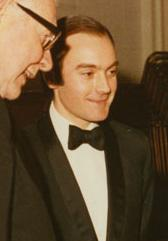
- Peter Palumbo, 1974

Chairman of the Arts Council of Great Britain
- In office 1989–1994
- Preceded by: Lord Rees-Mogg
- Succeeded by: abolished; replaced by national councils

Member of the House of Lords
- Lord Temporal
- Life peerage 4 February 1991 – 2 September 2019

Personal details
- Born: Peter Garth Palumbo; 20 July 1935 (age 91) London, UK
- Spouse(s): Denia Wigram (m. 1959; div. 1977) Hayat Mrowa (m. 1986)
- Children: 6, including James Palumbo
- Parent(s): Rudolph Palumbo (father); Elsie Gregory (mother)
- Relatives: Kamel Mrowa (father-in-law)
- Education: Scaitcliffe School; Eton College
- Alma mater: Worcester College, Oxford
- Occupation: Property developer
- Known for: Chairman, Arts Council of GB
- Website: www.lordpeterpalumbo.com

Peter Garth Palumbo, Baron Palumbo (born 20 July 1935), is a British property developer, devotee of architecture, and art collector, who served as the last Chairman of the unified Arts Council of Great Britain, before it was divided into separate councils in 1994.

Lord Palumbo sat as a Life Peer on the Conservative benches in the House of Lords from 1991 to 2019.

== Early life ==
Of Italian descent, Lord Palumbo is the only son of Rudolph Palumbo, also a property developer, by his first wife Elsie Gregory. He was educated at Scaitcliffe School, Englefield Green in Surrey, and then at Eton College before going up to Worcester College, Oxford, where he read jurisprudence graduating with a third-class degree.

== Career ==
=== Notable property projects and homes ===
In the 1960s Palumbo commissioned Ludwig Mies van der Rohe to build a tower in London; although it was designed, it was never built.

In 1972 Palumbo bought Farnsworth House in Plano, Illinois, US (outside of Chicago), designed by Ludwig Mies, to which Palumbo added the designer's furniture. He also expanded the grounds of the house by purchasing adjacent properties and placed in them the work of sculptors including Anthony Caro and Richard Serra. Palumbo sold the property at auction to the National Trust for Historic Preservation in 2003. Palumbo also owns Kentuck Knob, a private house built by Frank Lloyd Wright in the Allegheny Mountains south of Pittsburgh, Pennsylvania; owned a unit in the 860–880 Lake Shore Drive Apartments in Chicago; and for a time owned Le Corbusier's Maisons Jaoul in Neuilly-sur-Seine, Paris.

In 1994 Palumbo demolished the Mappin & Webb Building in the City of London and replaced it, at No 1 Poultry, with a building designed by the British architect, Sir James Stirling, which was opened by Sir Eddie George, then Governor of the Bank of England.

In 2000, Palumbo opened the Walbrook Club, a private members' club in the City of London, which he has owned and operated since.

=== Arts ===
Palumbo served as a Trustee of the Tate Gallery from 1978 until 1985 and Chairman of its foundation (1986–87). Formerly a Trustee of the Whitechapel Art Gallery and the Natural History Museum, he also served as Chairman of the Serpentine Gallery's Board of Trustees. Prime Minister Thatcher appointed him Chairman of the Arts Council of Great Britain, serving from 1988 until 1994.

Chancellor of the University of Portsmouth (1992–2007) and Chairman of the Friends of Highgate Cemetery, Lord Palumbo also served as a Trustee of the Architecture Foundation and chaired the jury of the Pritzker Prize for Architecture.

Palumbo led the fundraising effort to restore and refurbish the Church of St Stephen Walbrook in London, a building designed by Sir Christopher Wren which had been badly damaged during the Blitz (World War II) – the sculptor Henry Moore was commissioned by Palumbo to create its stone altar. The former Rector of St Stephen Walbrook and founder of the Samaritans, Dr Chad Varah, also served as the Palumbo family chaplain.

Upon Prime Minister Thatcher's nomination, he was elevated to the peerage, being created on 4 February 1991 Baron Palumbo, of Walbrook in the City of London, the territorial designation being taken from the ward and street in the parish where he was churchwarden, which were named after the former River Walbrook. Lord Palumbo sat in the House of Lords until retiring from parliament on 2 September 2019.

== Personal life ==
Palumbo married Denia Wigram (only daughter of Major Lionel Wigram) in 1959 – together they had one son (James Palumbo, Baron Palumbo of Southwark) and two daughters. They divorced in 1977.

After Denia died in 1986, Palumbo married Hayat Mrowa (daughter of the Lebanese newspaper publisher Kamel Mrowa, and ex-wife of businessman Ely Calil), having, by his second wife, a son (the Hon. Philip Palumbo), and two daughters.

== Royal connections ==
Lord Palumbo was a polo teammate of Charles, Prince of Wales, the two remaining close until 1984 when Charles publicly criticised Palumbo's plans to erect a building designed by Mies van der Rohe near St Paul's Cathedral, describing it as "a glass stump" which, faced with opposition, were not realised. In 1988, Palumbo became godfather to Princess Beatrice of York, the elder daughter of the Duke of York.

== Arms ==
Coat of arms of Peter Palumbo, Baron Palumbo
Notes Granted by the College of Arms Coronet Coronet of a UK Baron Crest the Top of a Dovecote Or, perched on its Conical Roof Vert a Dove's wings elevated and addorsed Or. Escutcheon Vert a Pale Or over all an Escarbuncle counterchanged. Supporters Dexter: an Alsatian Dog; Sinister: a Fox Proper, each resting the exterior foreleg on a rectangular Plinth Or. Compartment upon a Circle of Paving Stones Proper. Motto Loyaulté me lie (Loyalty binds me).

Media offices
Preceded by Lord Rees-Mogg	Chairman of the Arts Council of Great Britain; 1989–1994	Succeeded by Body replaced by national councils
Orders of precedence in the United Kingdom
Preceded by The Lord Sterling of Plaistow	Gentlemen; Baron Palumbo	Followed by The Lord Griffiths of Fforestfach
