= Rudolph Palumbo =

British property developer (1901–1987)

Rudolph Palumbo (27 March 1901 – 16 July 1987) was a British property developer who made his fortune both before the Second World War by developing various sites such as Regis House in the City of London and after by redeveloping bombsites.

== Early life ==
Rudolph (originally Rodolfo) Palumbo was born in London to the son of Italian immigrant parents Pasquale and Gaetana Palumbo from Amalfi, who ran a cafe in Lower Thames Street.

== Career ==
Palumbo's development company was called City Acre; he built its headquarters building in 1952, at 37A Walbrook, as the family office. Following an extensive conversion by Mark Birley, the Walbrook Club opened in 2000.

His portrait was painted by Oskar Kokoschka in 1960; this still hangs in its original position above the fireplace in what was his office and is now the dining room at 37A Walbrook.

== Personal life ==
Palumbo married Elsie Annie Gregory, a classical musician from Lancashire; their only child is Peter Palumbo, who like his father is a property developer.

Rudolph Palumbo is buried in the churchyard of St Stephen Walbrook, London.
