= Lady in Blue (Cézanne) =

Painting by Paul Cézanne

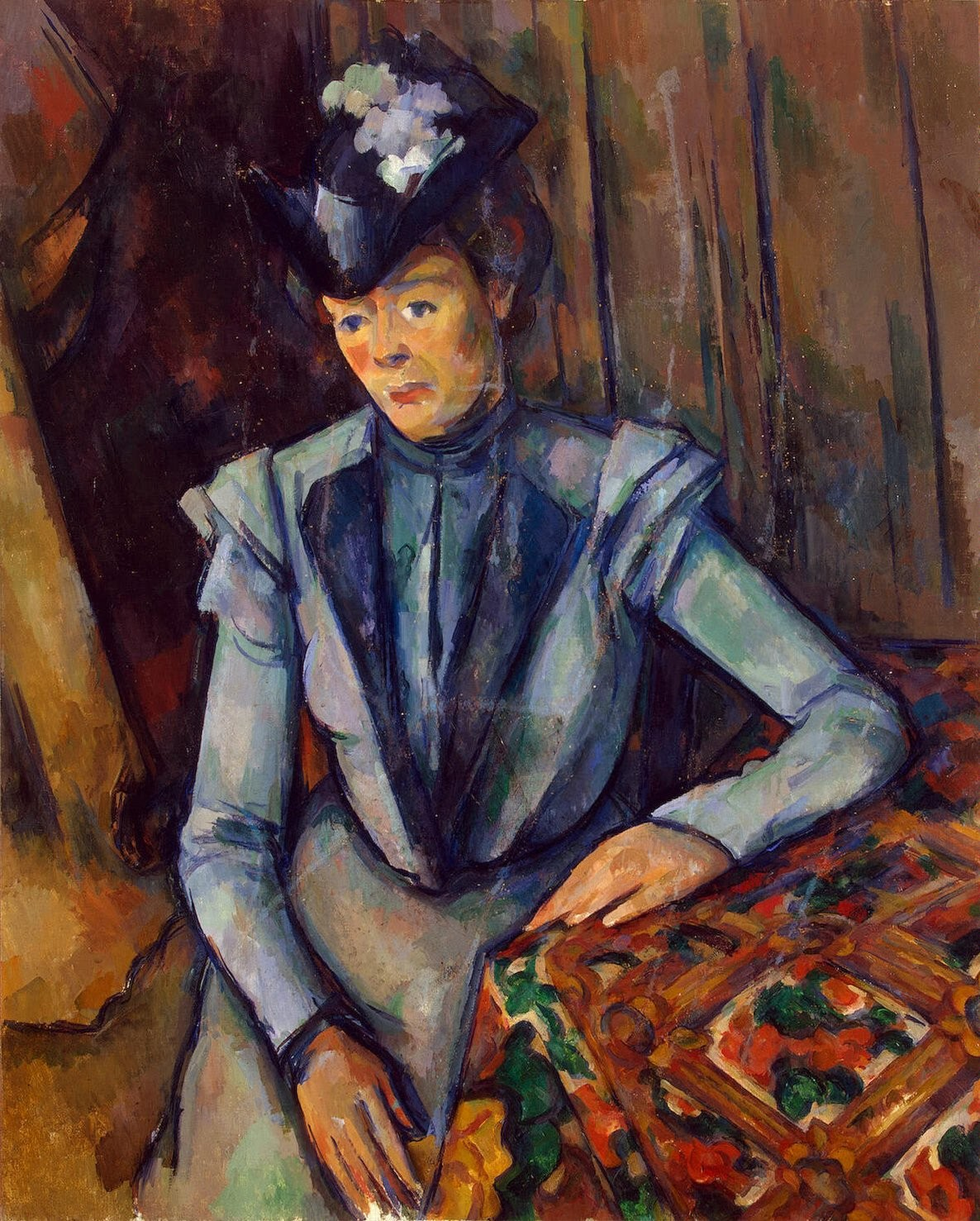
- Artist: Paul Cézanne
- Year: c. 1900
- Medium: Oil on canvas
- Dimensions: 88.5 cm × 72 cm (34.8 in × 28 in)
- Location: Hermitage Museum, Saint Petersburg

Lady in Blue is an oil on canvas painting by Paul Cézanne, executed c. 1900. It is held in the Hermitage Museum, in Saint Petersburg.

== History and description ==
The painting depicts a woman in a blue dress and a flower-trimmed hat, seated at a table covered with a colorful tablecloth (or rug). The surface of the paint layer contained several deep longitudinal scratches — it is believed this damage occurred in Cézanne's studio. They were later restored.

The model's name is unknown. It has been suggested that it is the artist's wife, Hortense Fiquet, though the woman depicted bears no resemblance to her. N. Yu. Semenova suggested she may be Madame Brémond, Cézanne's housekeeper, "reigning on the canvas with the monumentality of a queen", according to A. G. Kostenevich, this theory was first put forward by John Rewald.

One of Cézanne's last portraits of a woman, its tones, shapes and colours prefigure Fauvism and Cubism.

== See also ==
- List of paintings by Paul Cézanne
