= Frederic Marlett Bell-Smith =

Canadian artist

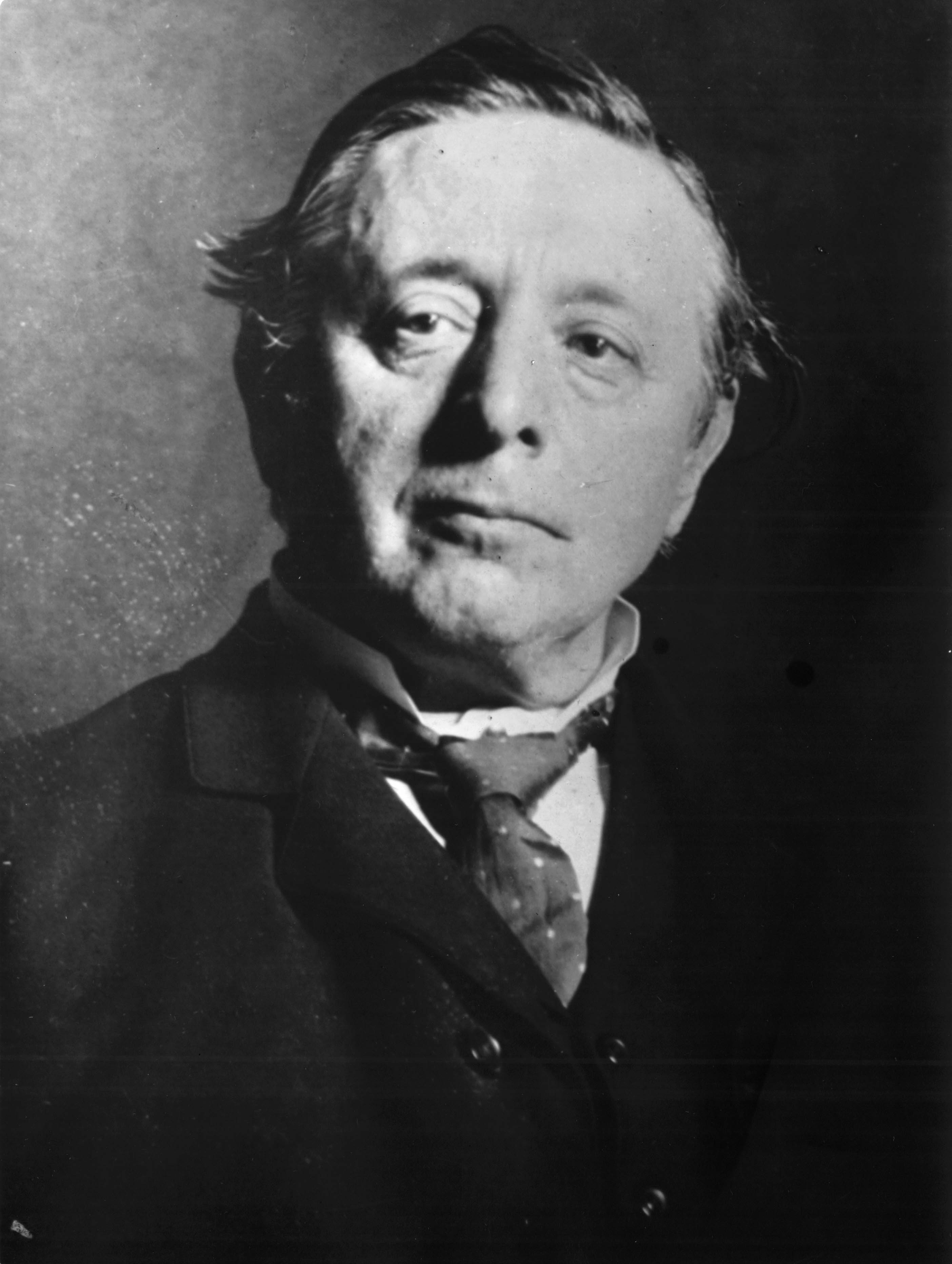
- Born: September 26, 1846; London, England
- Died: June 23, 1923 (aged 76); Toronto, Ontario, Canada
- Known for: landscape painter
- Spouse: Annie Myra Dyde (m. 1871)

Frederic Marlett Bell-Smith RCA (also known as F. M. Bell-Smith) (September 26, 1846 – June 23, 1923) was an English-born Canadian landscape painter known for his works of the Rocky Mountains and the Selkirk Range, Quebec and Maine.

== Career ==
Bell-Smith emigrated to British North America from England in 1866. He had studied painting in England at the South Kensington School of Art and worked as an artist and photographer in Montreal, where he helped his father, John Bell-Smith, "a painter of miniature portraits of considerable talent," to found the Society of Canadian Artists in 1867. In 1871, he moved to Hamilton, Ontario and married Anne Myra Dyde. In 1874 he moved to Toronto, then in 1879 returned to Hamilton.

Throughout the 1870s and 1880s he sketched, painted, and taught art classes at the Ontario College of Art, Toronto (1877-1877); in London, Ontario (1881–1888); in St. Thomas, Ontario as Art Director of Alma College (1881–1890); as Drawing Master to Central Public Schools in London (1882-1988); and then as principal of Western Branch of the Toronto Art School in (1888-1891). He returned to study in Paris at the Académie Colarossi in 1896.

== Painting the Rocky Mountains ==
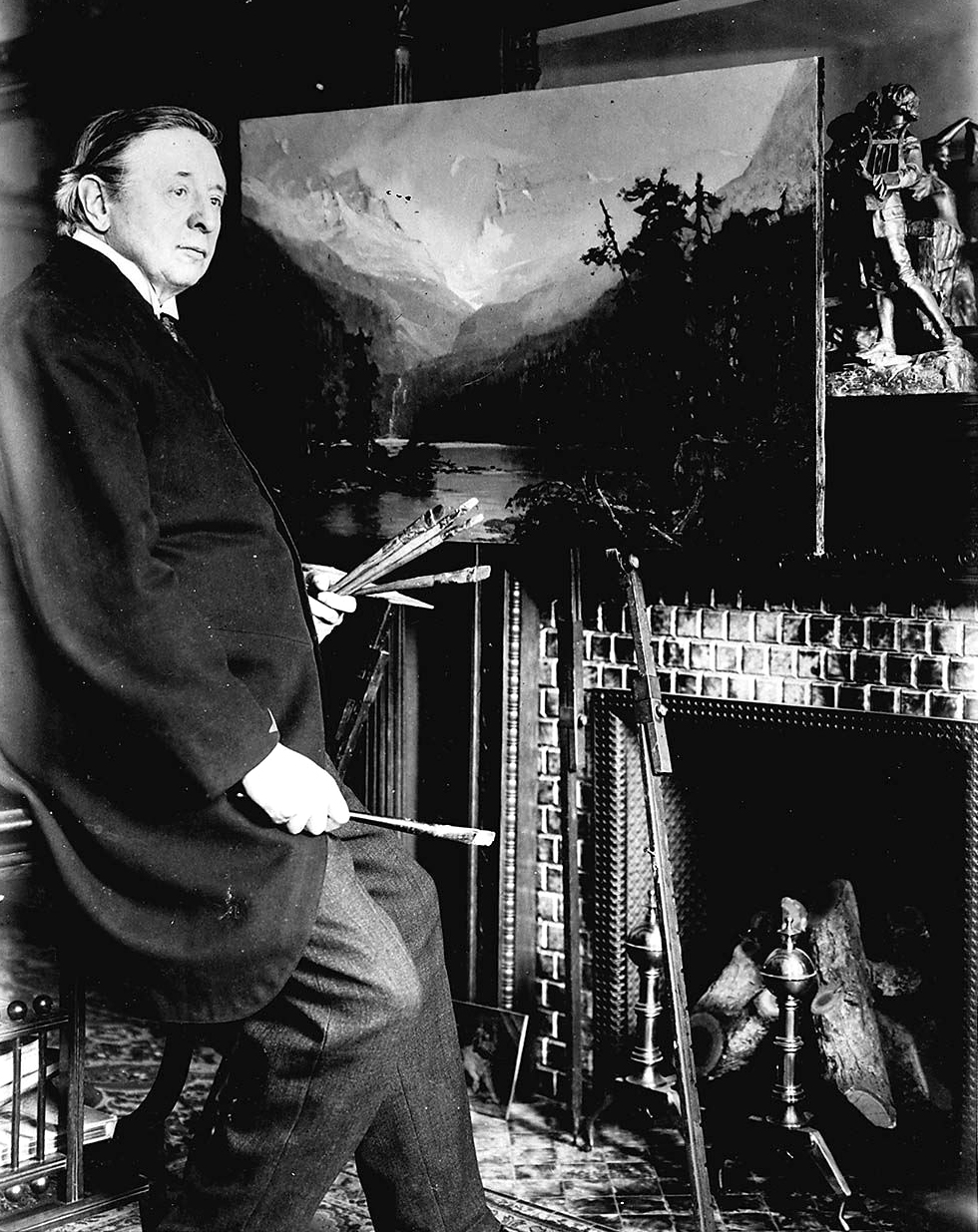
Bell-Smith painting Lake Louise (named for Princess Louise), c. 1908

In 1886 Bell-Smith seized the opportunity to paint the Canadian Rockies when the Vice-President of the Canadian Pacific Railway (CPR), William Cornelius Van Horne, offered free travel passes to several artists who would sketch and paint vistas of the Canadian west. The CPR wanted artistic works that would heighten public interest in transcontinental travel. Bell-Smith’s stylistically conservative paintings were popular in both eastern Canada and Britain, and he frequently returned to the west to work. He was particularly fond of the natural splendour of the area around Lake Louise and by the turn of the century he made annual trips to the west.

These experiences led Bell-Smith to advocate for a Canadian school of art which drew its uniqueness from the use of the Canadian landscape as its subject matter. Later artists, including Tom Thomson, Emily Carr, and the Group of Seven, contributed to this focus on Canada’s natural environment in art.

== Lights of a City Street ==
Bell-Smith also created many paintings of late Victorian and Edwardian eastern Canada and Britain. One of his most famous and playful paintings is Lights of a City Street, which portrays the intersection of Yonge and King Streets in Toronto in 1894. Bell-Smith depicted himself in the painting as the man buying a newspaper, his son is the man raising his hat, and the policeman is Bill Redford, the constable actually stationed at the corner.

The painting shows the warm accents of his later work and that he was sensitive to French Impressionism likely due to his studies abroad and with Thomas Alexander Harrison.

== Painting Queen Victoria ==
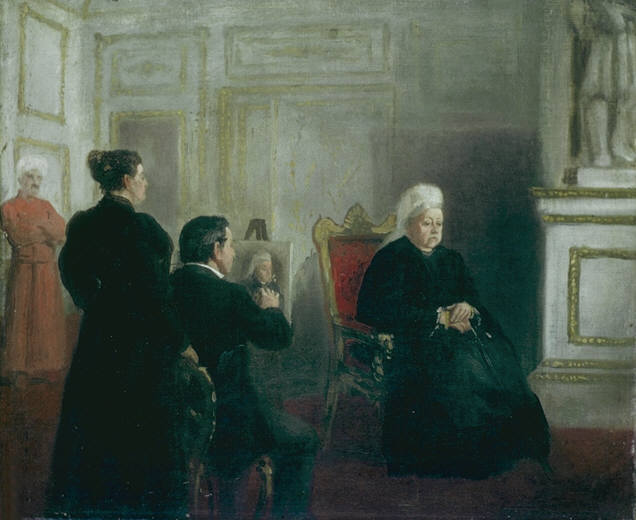
The Artist Painting Queen Victoria, 1895

In connection with a series of paintings related to the death of Prime Minister Sir John Thompson in 1894, Bell-Smith managed to negotiate a sitting with Queen Victoria, who normally disliked having her portrait taken by anyone aside from a few select portraitists. According to Bell-Smith, he followed the advice of a Canadian senator to approach Lord Clinton and Abdul Karim about a sitting with the Queen, but, received discouraging replies from both men. Bell-Smith was able to obtain sittings with Princesses Beatrice and Louise, the latter being married to the Duke of Argyll, who was a former Governor General of Canada and an advocate of Bell-Smith. The Princesses used their influence to persuade the Queen to sit for Bell-Smith. The cordial sitting lasted for over an hour, during which Queen Victoria permitted Bell-Smith to position her as he wished; Princess Louise, an artist herself, offered Bell-Smith advice. The Queen also spoke (mostly in German) to her daughters and other attendants about her grandchildren. At the end of the sitting, the Queen approved Bell-Smith’s work. This anecdotal episode demonstrated Bell-Smith’s influence and popularity in Britain. Indeed, Bell-Smith contemplated moving to Britain in the 1890s. However, he decided to divide his time between Canada and Europe, continuing to paint until his death, becoming less active towards the end of his life.

== Honours ==
He was a founding member of the Royal Canadian Academy of Arts in 1880 and was listed as an Associate member. He also belonged to the Society of Canadian Artists (1867) which he helped found; a founder member of the Ontario Society of Artists (1872), of which he was president (1905-1908); the Western Art League (1881); the Royal British Colonial Society of Artists (1908); the Palette Club, Montreal (1892); and the New Water Colour Society, Toronto (1900). In 1908 he was a founding member of the Arts and Letters Club of Toronto.

== Gallery ==
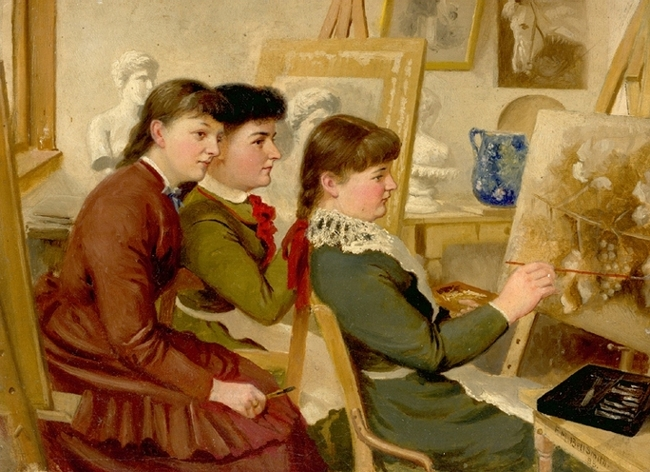
Three Artists, c. 1883

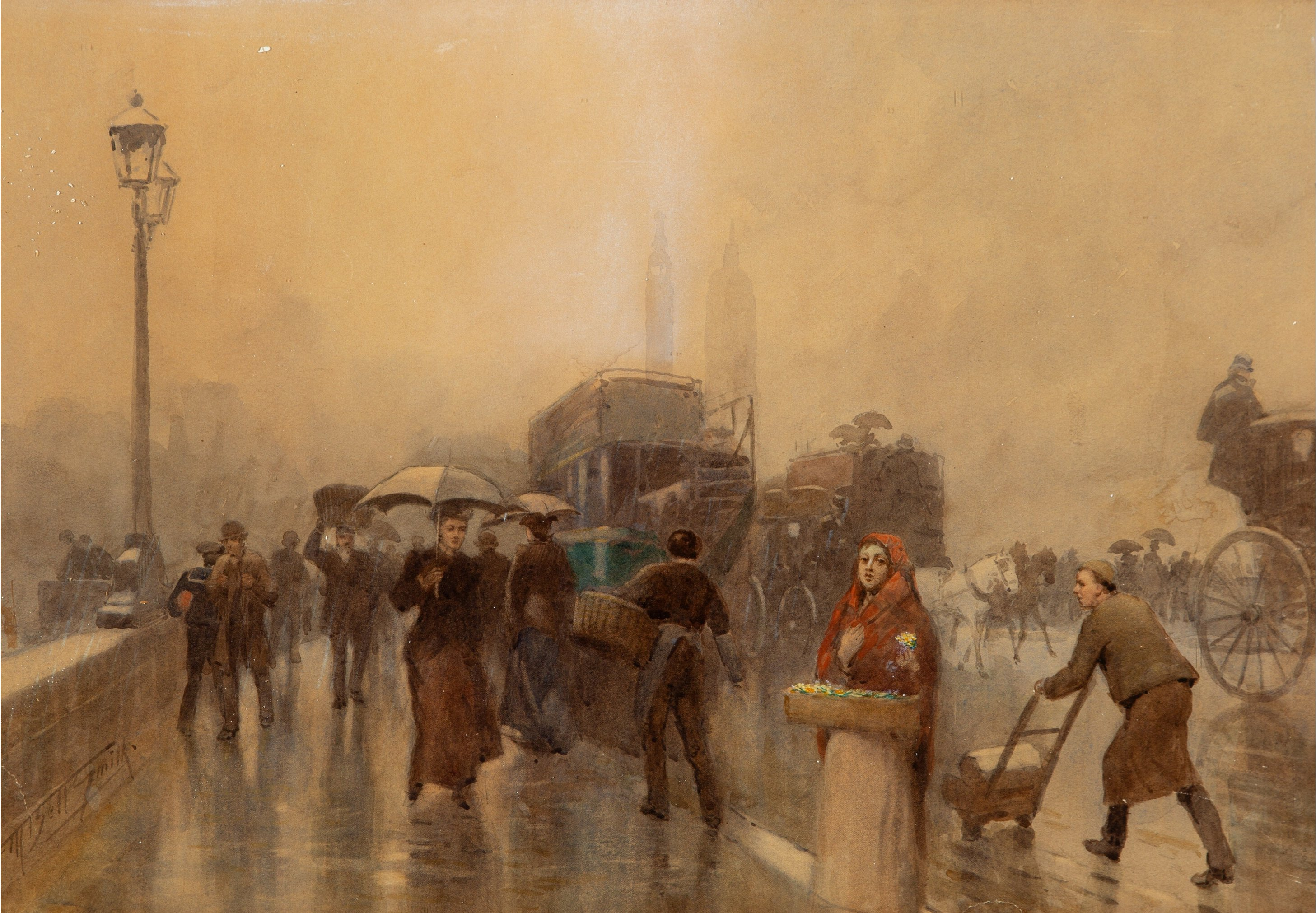
London Bridge

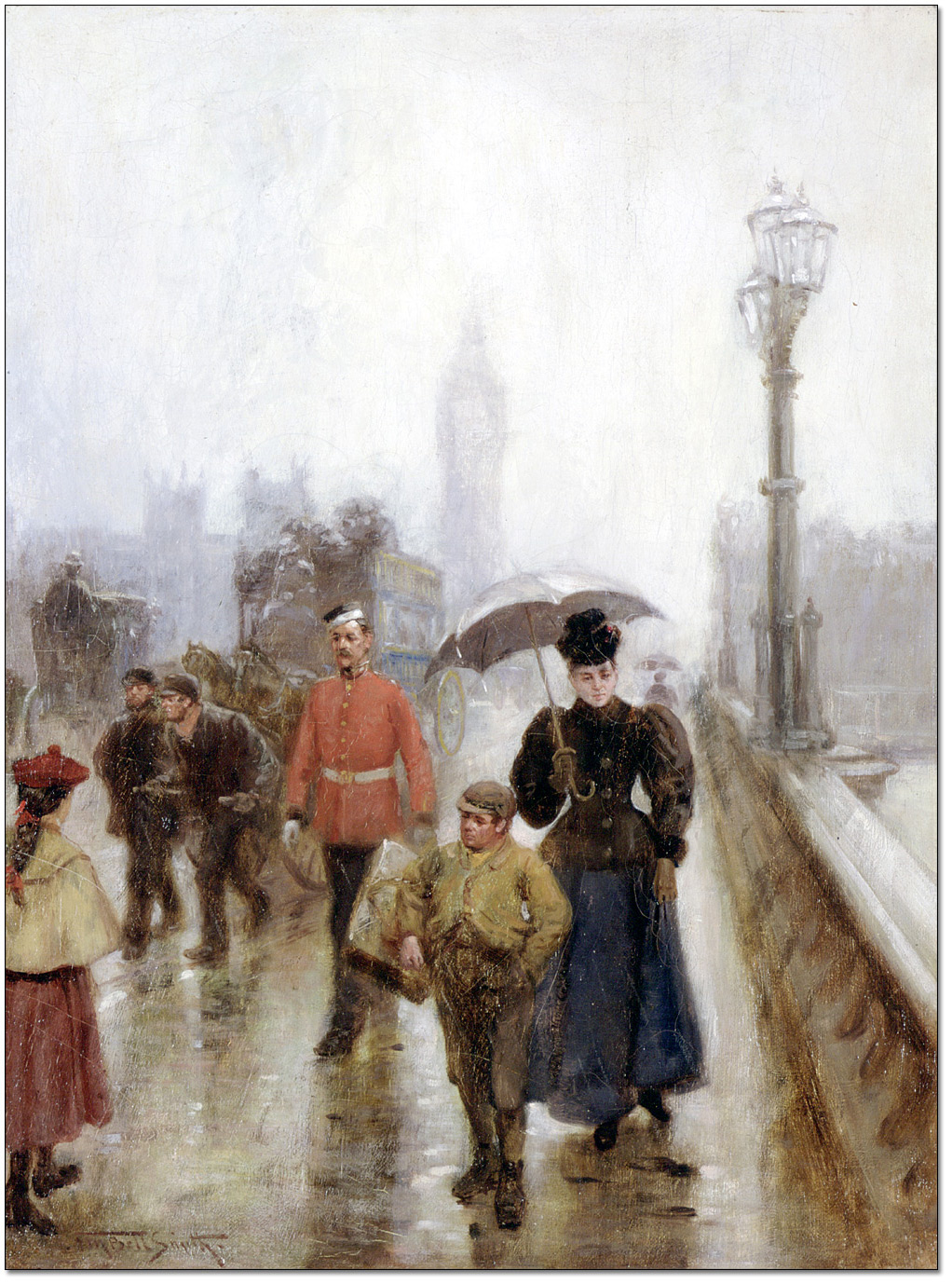
Westminster Bridge, ca. 1897

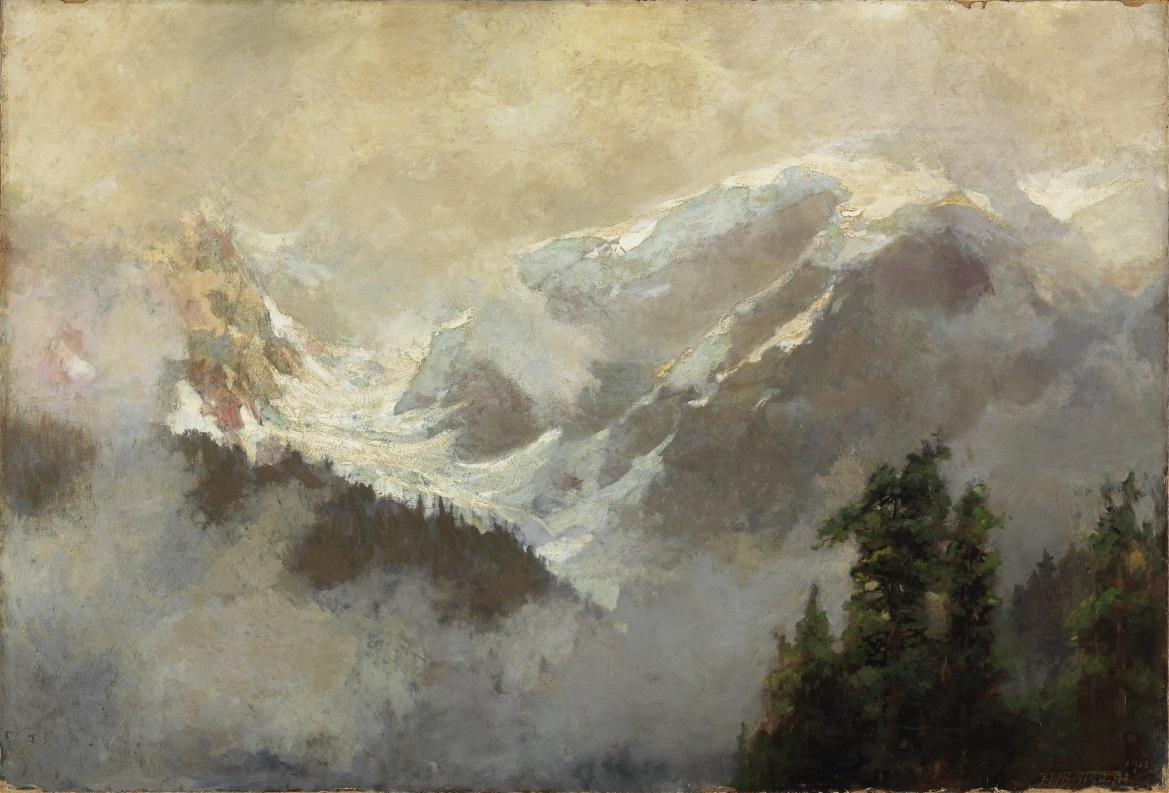
Mists and Glaciers of the Selkirks, 1911

The Heart of the Empire, 1909

== Record sale prices ==
At the Cowley Abbott Auction of "An Important Private Collection of Canadian Art", December 6, 2023, lot 102, Bell-Smith's School’s Out (1885), watercolour and gouache, 23 x 38 ins (58.4 x 96.5 cm), Auction Estimate: $15,000.00 - $20,000.00, realized a price of $66,000.00.

At the Heffel Auction House, "A Legacy Through Art: The Hudson’s Bay Company Collection", November 19, 2025, the special sale caused by the closing of the company, lot 021, Frederic Marlett Bell-Smith's Lights of a City Street, oil on canvas, signed and dated 1894 and on verso titled on the Hudson’s Bay Company Collection label and the exhibition labels, 52 1/2 x 78 3/4 in, 133.4 x 200 cm, Auction Estimate: $100,000 - $150,000 CAD, realized a price of $691,250.

== Bibliography ==
- Beinart, William; Hughes, Lotte (2007). Environment and Empire. The Oxford History of the British Empire Companion Series. Oxford: Oxford University Press.
- Boulet, Roger (1977). Frederic Marlett Bell-Smith (1846-1923). Victoria: Art Gallery of Greater Victoria.
- Boulet, Roger (21 May 2008). "Frederic Marlett Bell-Smith". The Canadian Encyclopedia.
- Boyanoski, Christine (2015). "Figures in the landscape en plein air". In Thom, Ian M. (ed.). Embracing Canada: Landscapes from Krieghoff to the Group of Seven. Vancouver and London: Vancouver Art Gallery and Black Dog Publishing. pp. 59ff.
- Bradfield, Helen (1970). Art Gallery of Ontario: The Canadian Collection. Toronto: McGraw-Hill.
- McBurney, Margaret (2007). The Great Adventure: 100 Years at The Arts & Letters Club. Toronto: The Arts and Letters Club of Toronto. ISBN 9780969458821.
- Newman, Paul (1992). Canada - 1892: Portrait of a Promised Land. Toronto: McClelland and Stewart.
