= Niels Moeller Lund =

Danish artist (1863–1916)

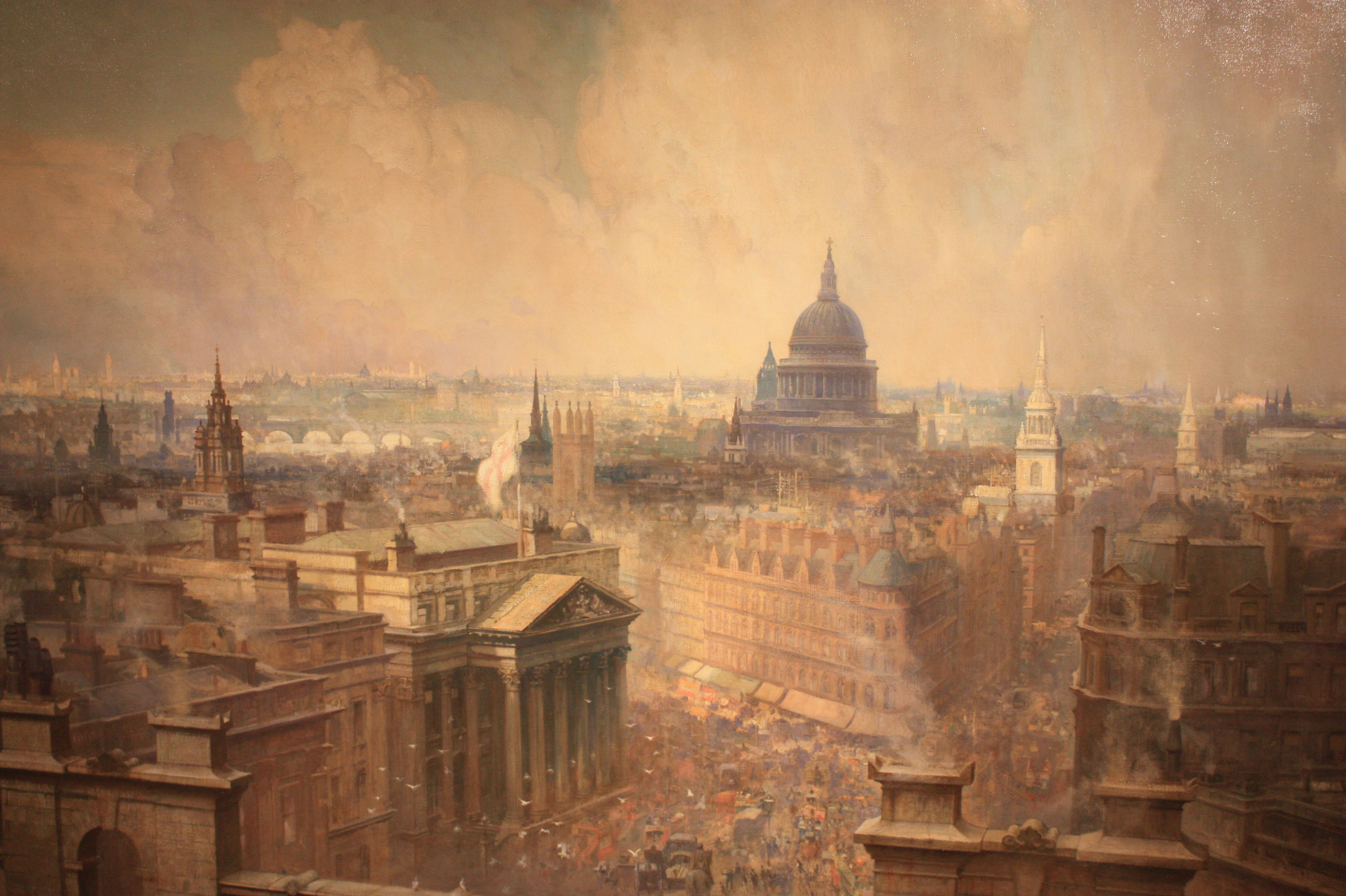
The Heart of the Empire, Niels Moeller Lund, 1904

Niels Moeller Lund (1863–1916) (Danish: Niels Møller Lund) was a Danish artist. He grew up in Newcastle-upon-Tyne and studied at the Académie Julian in Paris. He is known for his impressionistic paintings of England, particularly London and the North-East. His most well known painting - The Heart Of The Empire - hangs in the Guildhall Art Gallery. It provided inspiration for Frederic Marlett Bell-Smith's painting of the same name, which also depicted Threadneedle Street.

== Works ==
- Attack on the Japanese Battery at Shimonoseki, National Museum of the Royal Navy, Portsmouth
- After Rain, Shipley Art Gallery
- A Winter's Night, Laing Art Gallery
- Corfe Castle, Dorset, Laing Art Gallery
- Mid the Wild Music of the Glen, Laing Art Gallery
- Newcastle upon Tyne from Gateshead, Laing Art Gallery
- Newcastle upon Tyne from the East, Laing Art Gallery
- The Heart of the Empire, Guildhall Art Gallery
- The 'Revenge' leaving Jarrow
- John Cooke Esq, Derry City Council
- Joseph Cooke, Derry City Council
