= John Hutton (artist) =

New Zealand glass engraver and painter

- Born: 8 August 1906; Clyde, New Zealand
- Died: 28 July 1978 (aged 71); Clifton Hampden, England
- Occupations: Glass engraver Painter

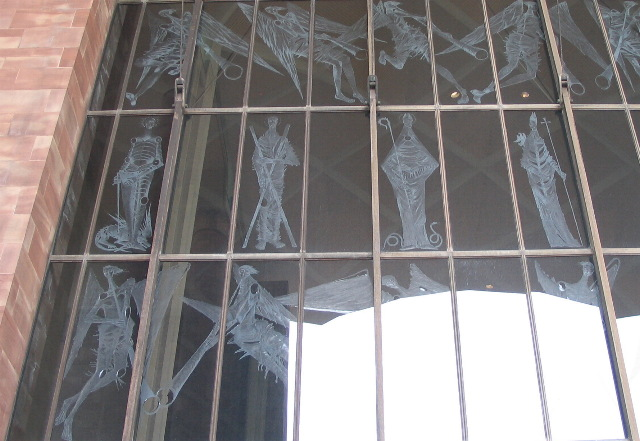
Great West Screen of Coventry Cathedral

John Hutton (8 August 1906 – 28 July 1978) was a glass engraving artist from New Zealand, who spent most of his career in the United Kingdom. He is best known for the Great West Screen he created for Coventry Cathedral, which was unveiled in 1962.

== Life ==
Born in Clyde on the South Island of New Zealand in 1906, Hutton was educated at Whanganui Collegiate School. After first studying law he decided to become a painter. Hutton married fellow artist Helen (Nell) Blair in 1934 and they moved to England in 1935. They lived for a while in an artists' commune at Assington Hall in Suffolk. John worked on several mural commissions until World War II broke out in 1939.

During the war Hutton joined the British Army serving in the 21st Army Group Camouflage Pool where he met and worked with the architect Basil Spence – a relationship which was to prove invaluable later on.

In 1947 Hutton designed his first large scale glass engravings – a series of four panels depicting the seasons, for the restaurant area on the passenger ship RMS Caronia, built for the Cunard White Star Line.

In 1950 Hutton was commissioned by Spence to provide murals for his 'Sea and Ships' pavilion that formed part of the 1951 Festival of Britain. Pleased with this collaboration, Spence asked Hutton to consider contributing to his plans for the rebuilding of Coventry Cathedral, which had been destroyed by enemy bombing during the Coventry Blitz in November 1940. A commission Spence won following a 1950 competition, he envisaged that his uncompromisingly modernist new cathedral would be filled with the best of modern British art. Over the following 10 years Hutton would complete what was to become his masterpiece, the engraving of the Great West Screen, unveiled to instant acclaim in 1962.

John and Helen had three children: Warwick Hutton, an artist, Macaillan Hutton, an architect, and Peter Hutton, a teacher.

John had employed an artist's model, Marigold Dodson, to pose for many of the figures in his artwork. His first marriage ended during this period and he married Dodson in 1963, though he still did work with his former wife subsequently on joint art projects. Hutton and Dodson had one daughter, Katie Hutton.

In 1975 he became first Vice President of the newly founded British Guild of Glass Engravers (Laurence Whistler was first President and Queen Elizabeth The Queen Mother was its first Patron).

Hutton worked on until 1978 when he died of cancer. His ashes were interred beneath a stone at the foot of his finest work – the Great West Screen at Coventry Cathedral.

== Commissions ==
=== Coventry Cathedral ===
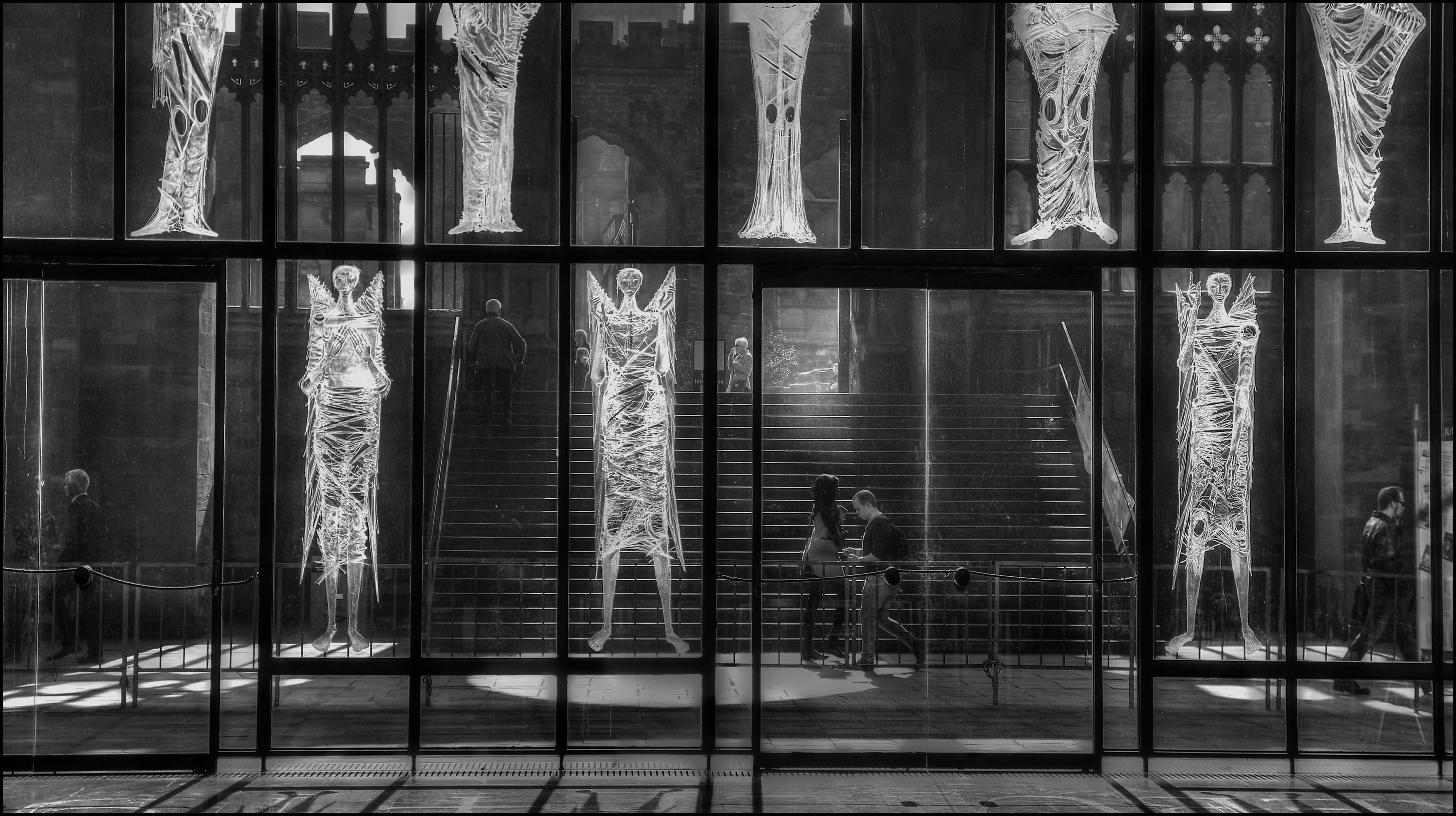
Part of the Coventry Cathedral Great West Screen. The pane smashed in January 2020 is bottom left in this picture.

Hutton is most famous for his glass engravings of 66 larger-than-life figures that form the decorative element of Coventry Cathedral's Great West Screen, known as the Screen of Saints and Angels. He received the commission from architect and friend Basil Spence in 1952. Taking over a decade to complete, the immense screen, designed in glass and bronze by construction engineer Ove Arup, measures 70ft high by 45ft wide, through which light pours to fill the cathedral (its actual orientation being to the south) as well as providing the physical link to the preserved ruins of the destroyed medieval cathedral opposite.

In all, 66 engraved figures fill the screen, in alternating bands of saints and angels. Grouped saints are primarily made up of the Apostles, Evangelists and British saints, as well as Old Testament prophets, while the lower order of angels includes the angel of annunciation, the angel of the resurrection and the angel of the measuring rod. Flying angels occupy the upper registers, many equipped with serenading trumpets.

Hutton's method was experimental at the outset and the commission took him 10 years to complete. By 1953 he had developed a unique method of engraving using a grinding wheel attached to a flexible drive. Hutton's method of working was first to scale up his design on black paper with chalk. Dodson acted as Hutton's model for all of the figures, though he used his own image as the model for the faces of the male angels. Stylistically he also took inspiration from French Romanesque sculpture. The finished design was fixed to the rear of the glass panel, which was engraved from the front using Hutton's homemade, handheld griding wheel.

A pane of the window, depicting The Angel with the Eternal Gospel, was smashed during a burglary in January 2020.

=== Guildford Cathedral ===
Hutton designed and engraved six larger-than-life Sentinel Angels for the West doors of Guildford Cathedral, Surrey, and designed three angels over the south transept doors. They were installed in 1961.

In January 2024 one of these was smashed in an act of apparent vandalism.

=== Shakespeare Centre ===
He designed glass engravings at the Shakespeare Centre at Stratford-upon-Avon including Ophelia, Macbeth and Romeo and Juliet.

=== National Library and Archives ===
Hutton created glass engravings of the National Library and Archives in Ottawa, Ontario, Canada: 37 panels over three floors with a principal theme of world literature including larger-than-life figures of Cervantes, Shakespeare, Molière and Tolstoy. He also made engravings of Apollo and the Nine Muses.

=== Dunkirk Memorial ===
Hutton produced the glass pane at the Dunkirk Memorial (1957).

=== Thanks-Giving Square ===
In 1975 Hutton designed 'The Spirit of Thanksgiving' for Thanks-Giving Square in Dallas, Texas, his first large project in the United States. Above the entryway to the non-denominational Chapel of Thanksgiving a large engraved window features a deeply-cut, three dimensional dove surrounded by circular surface effects. Representing the divine in some religions, Hutton said that "the dove is a symbol used throughout history to depict beauty, peace, hope and thanksgiving."

=== Bucklersbury House ===
In 1960, John Hutton created 24 panels to commemorate the discovery of the ruins of the Temple of Mithras on the site of the now demolished Bucklersbury House. In 2015 the panels were relocated to the new entrance to Bank station, beneath the Bloomberg building.

=== Wellington Cathedral ===
At New Zealand's Wellington Cathedral, the narthex is separated from the nave by a glass wall bearing Hutton's trumpet-playing angels, who are similar to the Coventry Cathedral angels in its Screen of Saints and Angels.

=== St Edmund's Church, Southwold ===
Hutton's 1971 engraved glass window depicting St Edmund at the moment of his death and martyrdom is located in the north chancel of St Edmund's Church in Southwold, Suffolk.

=== Other work ===
Some of his pieces of art are exhibited at the Corning Museum of Glass, USA.

At the Civic Centre of Newcastle upon Tyne, he created a glass screen representing some of the great inventions of the city, and figures from local mythology, with his son, Warwick Hutton.

He created a glass screen of four mermaids at Plymouth Civic Centre and designed three glass panel designs for the entrance hall balcony at Mercury House, London.

== Gallery of John Hutton's works ==
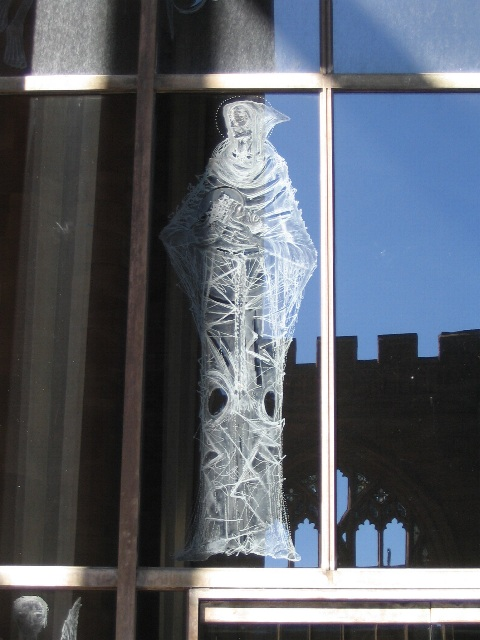
Engraving of St Cuthbert, Coventry Cathedral

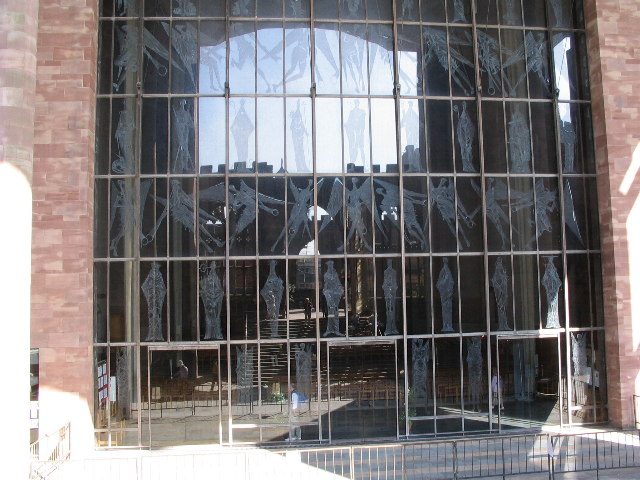
West window, Coventry Cathedral

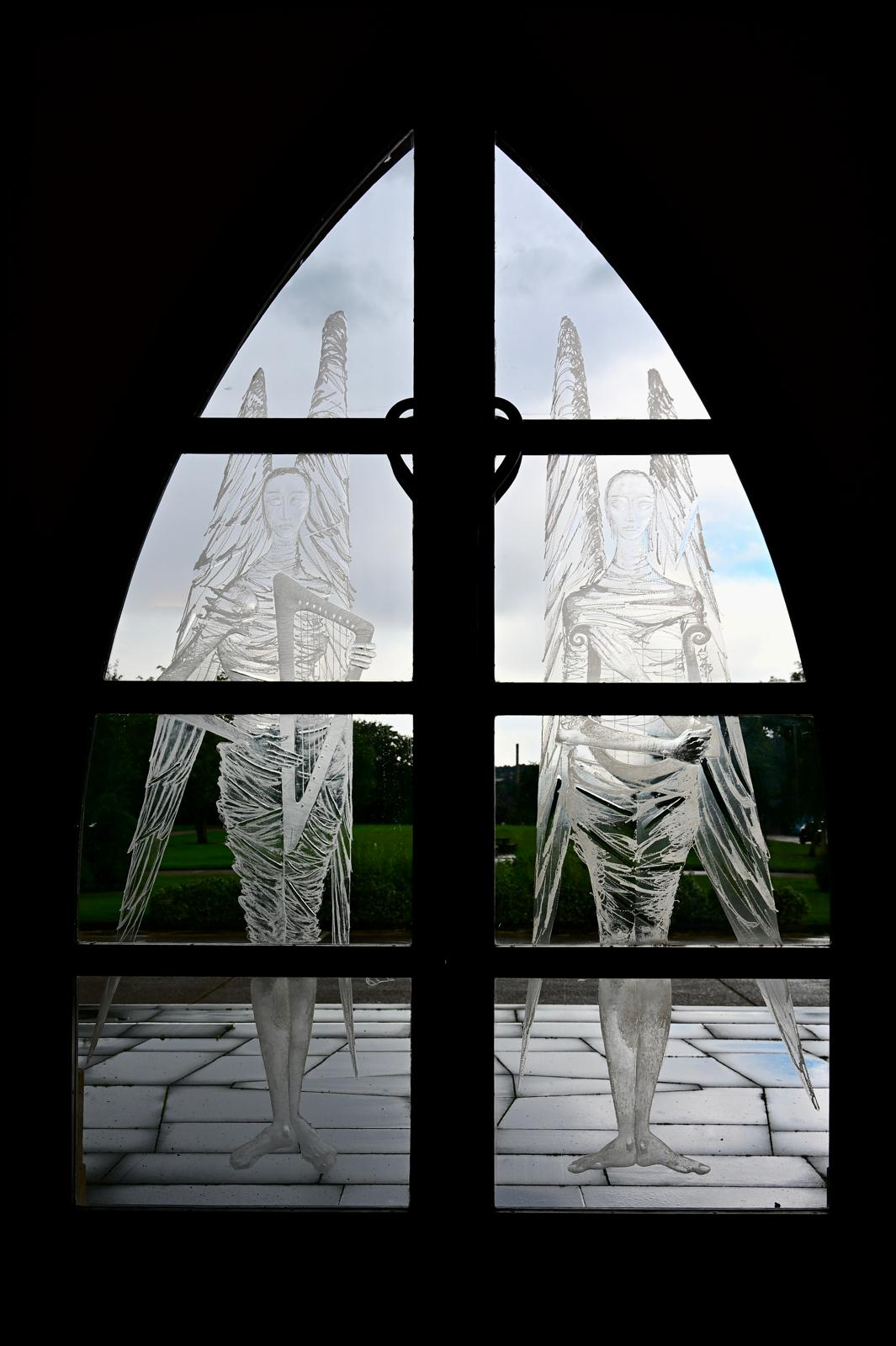
Sentinel Angels, central west door, Guildford Cathedral

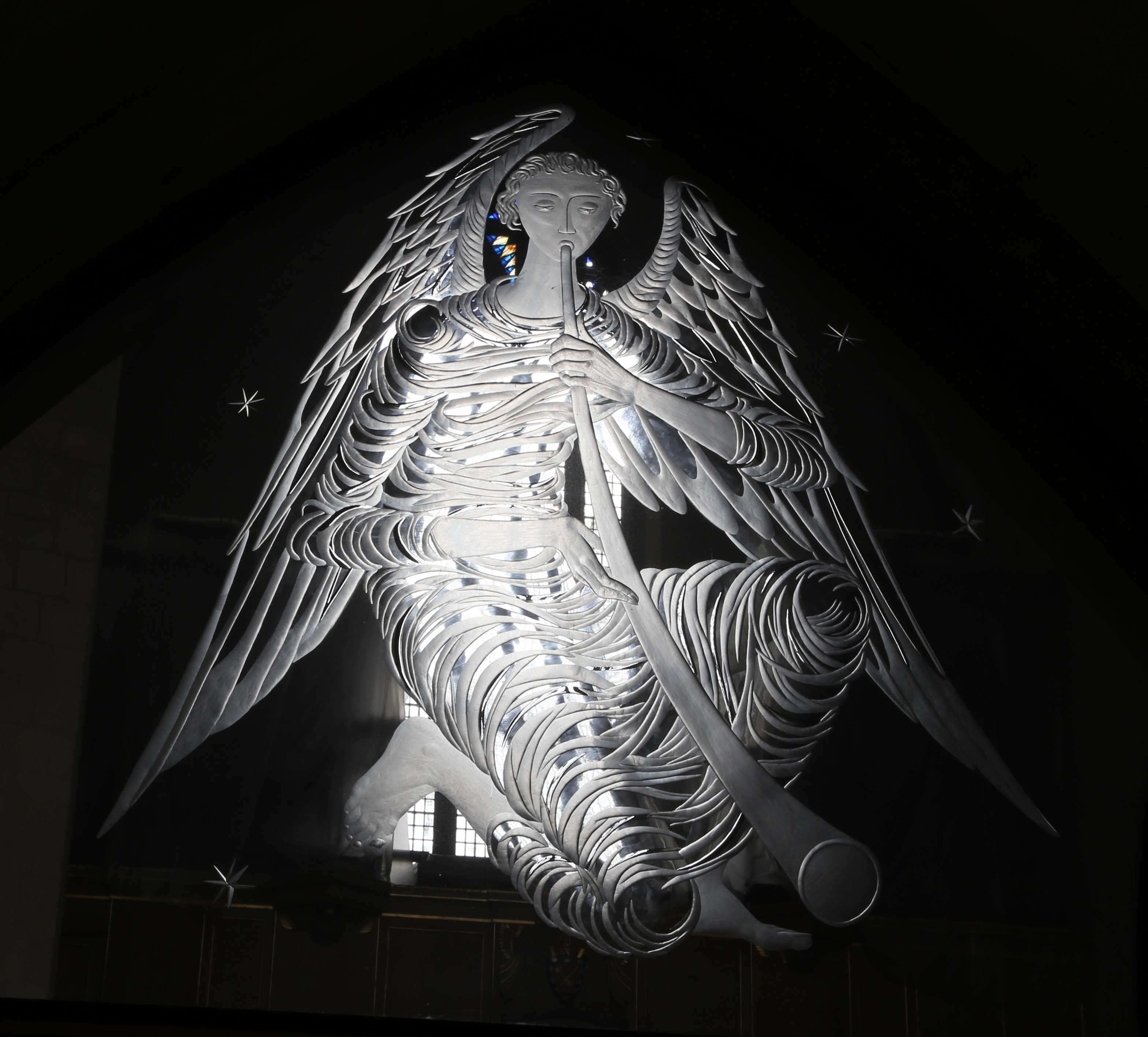
One of three carved glass angels for the south porch of Guildford Cathedral

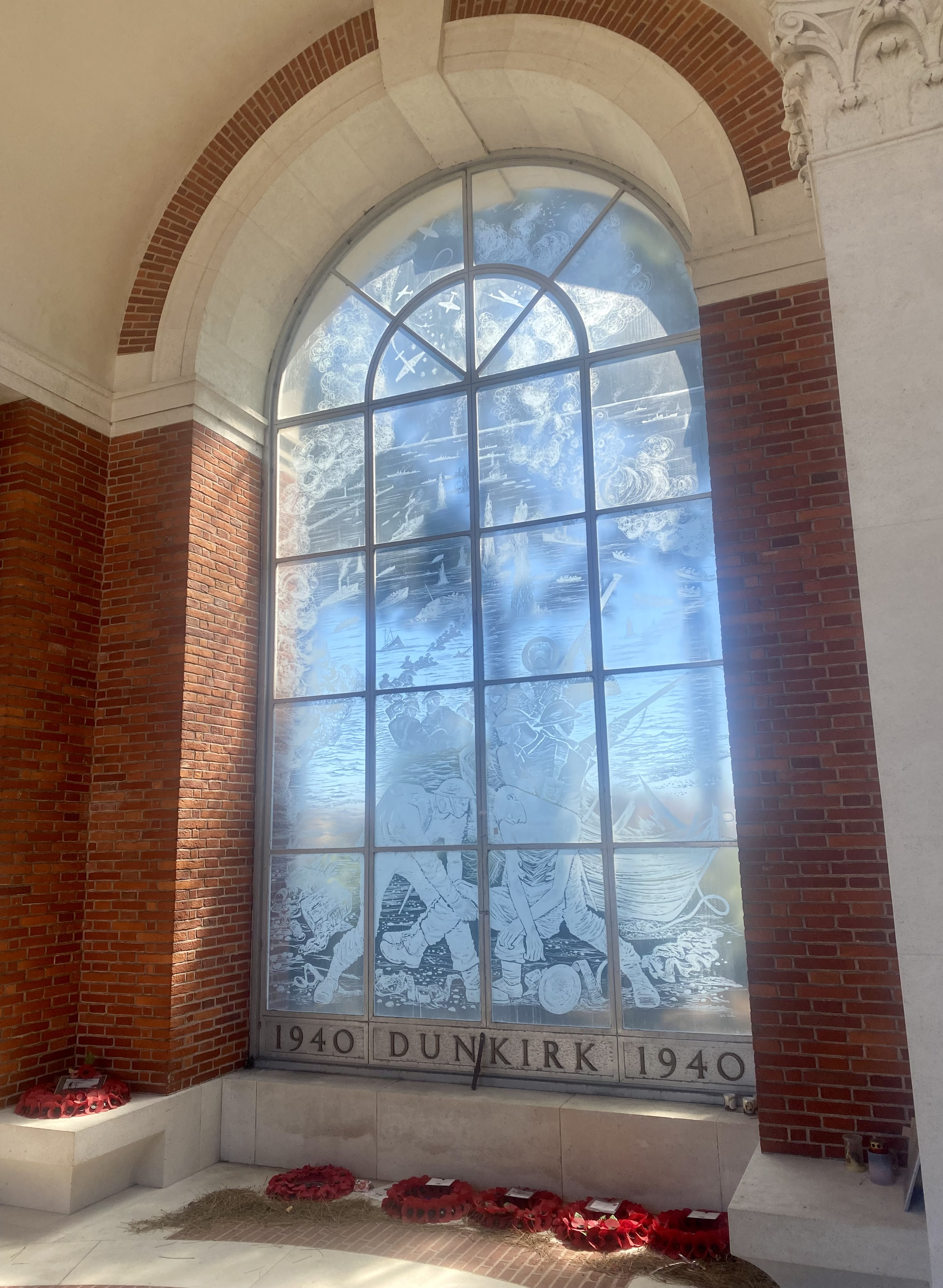
Dunkirk glass memorial

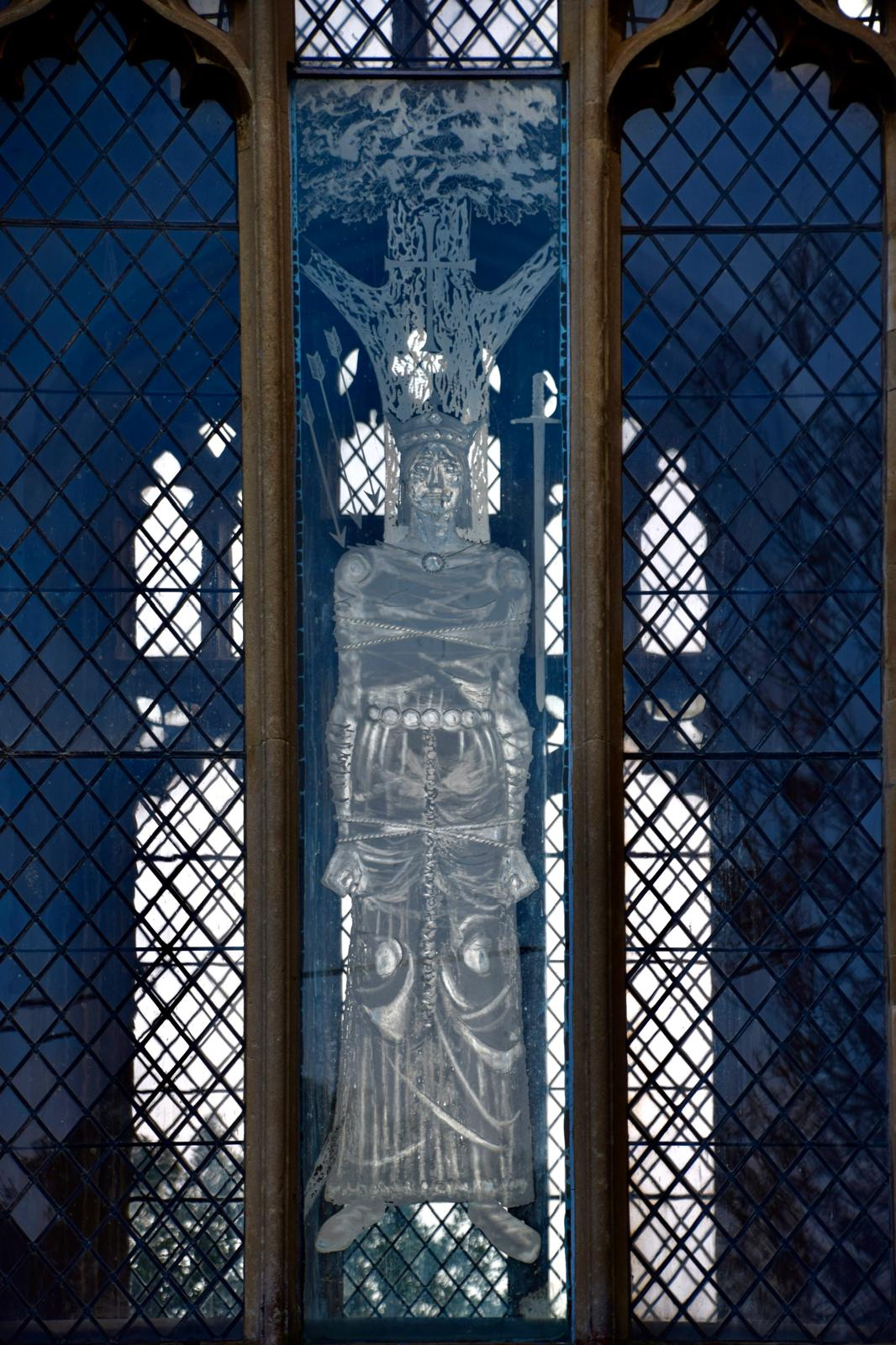
St Edmund King & Martyr, St Edmund's Church, Southwold

== Books ==
- Brentnall, Margaret and Marigold Hutton. John Hutton: Artist and Glass Engraver. Philadelphia: The Art Alliance Press, 1986. Several appendices document Hutton's work (mural paintings, glass and other media; U.S. installations include one at Corning Museum of Glass and two in Texas). Hard cover, 216 pages ISBN 0-87982-502-2
- John Hutton's Glass Engravings. © Minister of Supply and Services Canada 1993, Cat. No. SN3-283/1993 ISBN 0-662-59797-4
- Hutton, John. John Hutton's Glass Engravings : Les Gravures Sur Verre De John Hutton. January 1977 ISBN 0-660-00900-5
- John Hutton, Engraved Glass, Drawings, Paintings. Frank No: 1117, Commonwealth Institute, UK, 1969 ISBN No. Duncan No., 16 pages (Exhibition catalogue at the Commonwealth Institute Art Gallery, London) ISBN 0-9500398-0-2
- George Thomas Noszlopy. Public sculpture of Warwickshire, Coventry and Solihull, Series: Liverpool University Press – Public Sculpture of Britain, ISBN 978-0-85323-847-8 . Published March 2003. P.54-55: Entrance to the Shakespeare's Birthplace Trust Gallery in Stratford upon Avon – Characters from the Works of Shakespeare (Hutton's glass engravings)
- Hutton, John The West Window at Coventry Cathedral English Counties Periodicals Ltd, ?1962, 29 pages, illustrated.
