= W. F. Grimes =

Welsh archeologist (1905–1988)

W. F. Grimes CBE
- Born: William Francis Grimes; 31 October 1905; Pembroke, Wales
- Died: 25 December 1988 (aged 83)
- Education: Bedford Modern School; University College of South Wales and Monmouthshire
- Occupation: Archaeologist
- Spouse(s): Barbara Lilian Morgan (m. 1928, divorced) Audrey Williams (died) Mrs Molly Waverley Sholto Douglas (m. 1980)

William Francis Grimes CBE (known as Peter; 31 October 1905 – 25 December 1988) was a Welsh archaeologist. He devoted his career to the archaeology of London and the prehistory of Wales. He was appointed a CBE in 1955.

== Early life ==
Grimes was born in Pembroke in Wales. His father was a draughtsman with the Pembroke docks board. He was educated at Pembroke county school and then at Bedford Modern School after his father moved to Bedford to work as a draughtsman on airships.

Grimes returned to Wales in 1923 to study Latin at the University College of South Wales and Monmouthshire in Cardiff, where his lecturers included Mortimer Wheeler and Cyril Fox. Wheeler was also Keeper and then from 1923 Director of the National Museum of Wales. Grimes graduated with first-class honours in 1926.

== Career ==
Wheeler moved to become Director of the London Museum in 1926, and Cyril Fox replaced him as Director of the National Museum of Wales. Grimes became an assistant keeper of archaeology at the National Museum of Wales, working with the newly appointed keeper of archaeology, Victor Erle Nash-Williams. He received an MA from the University of Wales in 1930 for a dissertation on the Roman pottery from the 20th Legion's works at Holt (then in Denbighshire). He became interested in the prehistory of Wales, and was involved in excavations at Pyle, Ludchurch, Corston Beacon and Llanboidy.

Grimes became a Fellow of the Society of Antiquaries of London in 1934. He published a book on the prehistory of Wales in 1939, Guide to the Collection Illustrating the Prehistory of Wales, which won the Cambrian Archaeological Association's G. T. Clark prize in 1949. The book was republished as The Prehistory of Wales in 1951, and a second edition followed in 1959. He met Audrey Williams in 1935, while preparing an exhibition in Swansea for the centenary of the Royal Institution of South Wales. They went on to work together at many excavations in Wales and elsewhere, and were later married.

Grimes moved to Southampton in 1938 to become an assistant archaeology officer with the Ordnance Survey, and was quickly involved in the excavation of the newly discovered ship burial at Sutton Hoo the following year. He was seconded to the Ministry of Works in the Second World War, and worked with Audrey Williams on quick surveys and excavations before the construction of new airfields and other military structures. His discoveries included an Iron Age religious site at Heathrow.

In 1945, he succeeded Mortimer Wheeler as director of the London Museum, then based in Lancaster House. He was involved in the programme to excavate Blitz sites in London before they were redeveloped. For this work, he received the freedom of the City of London in 1952. A highlight was the excavation of the London Mithraeum with Audrey Williams, which was discovered at a building site at Walbrook in 1954. The site was featured in the Illustrated London News illustrated with drawings by Alan Sorrell.

The unexpected discovery of a bust of Mithras on the last scheduled day of the excavation generated considerable press and public interest, debates in Parliament and discussion in the Cabinet. The excavation was extended, allowing further discoveries to be made, but delaying the construction. Although Bucklersbury House was built over the site, Grimes succeeded in salvaging many of its finds and features including marble statuary attesting to the wealth of its congregation. The temple was reconstructed nearby in the 1960s, but the work was not supervised by archaeologists and Grimes was dismissive of the result.

Grimes was appointed CBE in 1955. He continued his excavations in London after he succeeded V. Gordon Childe as director of the Institute of Archaeology and professor of archaeology at the University of London in 1956 (Wheeler had founded the Institute in 1937, and Childe became director after Wheeler resigned in 1946). While Grimes was its director, the Institute moved from St John's Lodge in Regent's Park to new premises at Gordon Square.

Grimes remained interested in the archaeology of Wales. He received an honorary DLitt from the University of Wales in 1961, and was president of the Cambrian Archaeological Association in 1963–64. He served on many commissions and committees with a variety of official bodies and archaeological societies and organisations, including the Society of Antiquaries, the Royal Archaeological Institute, and the Council for British Archaeology. He was a member of the Royal Commission on the Ancient and Historical Monuments of Wales for 30 years from 1948, also serving a period as chairman, and joined the Royal Commission on the Historical Monuments of England in 1964. He retired from both commissions in 1978. Between 1975 and 1988, he served as the first chairman of the Dyfed Archaeological Trust.

== Private life ==
Grimes married a childhood friend Barbara Lilian Morgan in 1928. They had two children. They were divorced in 1959, and Grimes became the third husband of Audrey Williams. She bestowed on him the nickname Peter. They retired to her home in Brynmill in Swansea in 1973. After Audrey died in 1978, Grimes was remarried to Mrs Molly Waverley Sholto Douglas in 1980.

He suffered from Parkinson's disease in later life, and died at home in Swansea. He was cremated, and his ashes were scattered at Pwlldu Bay on the Gower Peninsula, where the ashes of his second wife Audrey had also been scattered.

== Published works ==
- The Megalithic Monuments of Wales, Cardiff: National Museum of Wales, 1936.
- The Prehistory of Wales, Cardiff: National Museum of Wales, 1951.
- Grimes, W. F. (January 1955). "The Council for British Archaeology: The First Decade". The Archaeological News Letter. 5 (8). Linden Publicity: 139–145.
- "Excavations in the City of London", in Bruce-Mitford, R. L. S. (ed.), Recent Archaeological Excavations in Britain, London: Routledge & Kegan Paul, 1956.
- The Excavation of Roman and Mediaeval London, London: Routledge & Kegan Paul, 1968.

== See also ==
- Nautical Archaeology Society
