= Roger Tomlin =

British archaeologist

Roger Tomlin FSA
- Born: 1943 (age 82–83)

Academic work
- Discipline: Archaeology
- Sub-discipline: Roman Archaeology; Classical Archaeology; Greek and Latin text
- Institutions: Cornell University; University of Durham; Wolfson College, Oxford

Roger Simon Ouin Tomlin FSA (born 1943) is a British archaeologist specialising in the translation of Latin text and epigraphy. Tomlin is an Emeritus Fellow of Wolfson College, Oxford.

== Early life ==
Tomlin first studied Honour Moderations (Mods) at Oxford University before continuing onto study Literae humaniores (Greats). His college tutor was Peter Brunt, the Camden Professor of Ancient History. Tomlin's graduate work, a study of the reign of Emperor Valentinian I, was supervised by Peter Brown of All Souls College.

== Career ==
After graduating, Tomlin worked in the United States for a couple of years, before returning to take up a post at the University of Oxford teaching Late Roman History. He succeeded Richard Wright as editor of the Roman Inscriptions of Britain project and started working intensively on translating inscriptions. Tomlin published the first translation of the curse-tablets from the Roman Baths at Aquae Sulis (Bath, UK) in 1988. Tomlin translated the Bloomberg tablets, a collection of 405 wooden tablets inscribed with ink, found between 2010 and 2013, during excavations for the Bloomberg building in London. In 2019 a stylus from Roman London was translated by Tomlin; it was found to contain a humorous message to give to someone as a souvenir.

Tomlin is a member of the Centre for the Study of Ancient Documents in Oxford.

=== Awards ===
Tomlin was elected as a Fellow of the Society of Antiquaries of London on 5 May 1976.

In March 2017 he received the István Hahn prize and gave an honorary lecture at Eötvös Loránd University in Budapest.

Tomlin had a Festschrift dedicated to him in 2019, titled "Litterae Magicae: Studies in honour of Roger S. O. Tomlin".

== Select publications ==
Note: (Note: As of 2019 Tomlin, had 127 published works attributed to him.)

- 1988. "Tabellae Sulis: Roman Inscribed Tablets of Tin and Lead from the Sacred Spring at Bath", in Cunliffe, B. (ed) The Temple of Sulis Minerva at Bath. II: The Finds from the Sacred Spring (Oxford University Committee for Archaeology Monographs 16). Oxford. 56-269.
- 1993. "Votive objects: the inscribed lead tablets" in Woodward, A. and Leach, P. The Uley Shrines. Excavation of a ritual complex on West Hill, Uley, Gloucestershire, 1977-79. London: English Heritage, 113-130.
- 2004. Curse Tablets of Roman Britain. Oxford: Centre for the Study of Ancient Documents.
- 2005. (as editor) History and Fiction. Six essays celebrating the centernary of Sir Ronald Syme. London.
- 2005. "Wooden Stylus Tablets from Roman Britain" in Images and Artefacts of the Ancient World, ed. Alan K. Bowman and Michael Brady. British Academy Scholarship Online.
- 2009. The Roman Inscriptions of Britain, volume III: Inscriptions on Stone, found or notified between 1 January 1955 and 31 December 2006 (with Wright, R.P., and Hassall, M.W.C.). Oxford, Oxbow Books.
- 2010. "Cursing a Thief in Iberia and Britain", in Gordon, R. and Marco Simon, F. (eds) Magical Practices in the Latin West. Papers from the International Conference held at the University of Zaragoza 30th Sept-1st Oct 2005 (RGRW 168). Leyden-Boston. Pp. 245–274.
- 2015. "An Epistolary Brick from Lower Moesia" (with Mariya Doncheva). Zeitschrift für Papyrologie und Epigraphik 194, pp. 292–293.
- 2016. London's First Voices: Writing tablets from the Bloomberg London excavations 2010-14 (MOLA Monograph Series 72). London.
