= Audrey Williams (archaeologist) =

Welsh archaeologist

- Born: 1902; Dinas Powys, Wales
- Died: 1978 (aged 75–76)
- Education: Somerville College, Oxford
- Known for: Archaeology
- Spouses: P. J. Williams (div. 1950); Illtyd Stockwood (1952-1956; divorced); W. F. Grimes (m. 1959)

Audrey Williams (née Davies; 1902–1978) was a Welsh archaeologist. She was the first woman president of the Royal Institution of South Wales (RISW) and a Fellow of the Society of Antiquaries. She worked on several notable excavations during the mid-20th century in Wales, London and south-east England, including the Gower Peninsula, Verulamium and the Temple of Mithras in London.

== Biography ==
Williams was born Audrey Davies in Dinas Powys, Wales. Her family moved to Swansea when she was 14, and she studied at Swansea Girl's High School. In 1920, she won a scholarship to Somerville College, Oxford, to study English, the same year that the Statute for Degrees for Women was passed, giving women the right to take degrees.

She returned to Swansea after graduation in 1923 and worked as a teacher at a local school. She resigned this post when she married her first husband, Percy James Williams, a local architect. It was through Williams, who had a keen interest in Swansea ceramics, that she became involved with Swansea Museum and the Royal Institute of South Wales in the 1930s. She helped her husband to reorganise and catalogue ceramic collections within the museum. She became the Honorary Curator of Antiquities, and in 1936 compiled an accession register of all the objects, information from which is still used today. It was during this time that she first worked with W. F. Grimes who was assistant keeper of archaeology at the National Museum of Wales. She excavated three Iron Age Promontory Forts on the Gower Peninsula.

Between 1941 and 1944 she was appointed Assistant Inspector of Ancient Monuments by the Ministry of Works. She was to excavate archaeological sites before they were developed for defences or military instillations, again working alongside Grimes.

As part of her work for the Ministry of Works, she excavated a number of sites in Swansea, Oxfordshire, Dorset, and Pembrokeshire and in recognition of her work she was elected as a Fellow of the Society of Antiquaries. In July 1944, she was elected President of the Royal Institution of South Wales.

In 1945, she left Swansea and was appointed as curator of Verulamium Museum in St Albans. From there she began her excavation career in London and south-east England, working alongside many notable archaeologists of the time including Glyn Daniel, Dame Kathleen Kenyon and Sir Mortimer Wheeler. She was director of excavations for the Canterbury Excavations Committee, which was set up in 1944 to investigate archaeology uncovered during bombing raids, and in advance of redevelopment. Sheppard Frere succeeded her in 1946 as director. They co-wrote several publications about the Roman excavations, and she published two articles in her own name.

In London, she once again worked with Grimes, on excavations at sites in the City of London affected by bomb damage, prior to their redevelopment, including Barbican, St Brides and Fleet Street. One of the most prominent excavations she worked on was the Temple of Mithras, which was discovered at a building site at Walbrook in 1954. The unexpected discovery of a bust of Mithras on the last scheduled day of the excavation generated considerable press and public interest, debates in Parliament and discussion in the Cabinet. The excavation was extended, allowing further discoveries to be made, but delaying the construction. Grimes is often solely credited as the director of the excavations, however he was running another site in London at the same time. Williams was on site every day and her work makes up much of the archive; because of her contribution, John Shepherd ensured her name was included in the title in his report of the excavation, The Temple of Mithras, London: Excavations by W. F. Grimes and A. Williams at the Walbrook. Grimes always described her as the better excavator.

In 1950, she divorced Williams, and remarried in 1952 to Illtyd Stockwood, which also ended in divorce in 1956. In 1959, she married W.F. Grimes and retired from professional archaeology. The couple returned to Wales in 1973, to Williams's home in Brynmill in Swansea. Williams died in 1978. Her ashes were scattered at Pwlldu Bay on the Gower Peninsula.

== Published works ==
=== In Archaeologica Cambrensis ===
- Roman coin from Gorseinon, Glamorgan. XCI, p. 311, 1936.
- Hammer or mace from Oxwich, Glamorgan. XCI, p. 309. 1936
- Some Roman pottery from Basingwerk Abbey. XCI, p. 144, 1936.
- Bronze implements from Swansea, Glamorgan. XCII, p. 333, 1937.
- Prehistoric and Roman pottery in the museum of the Royal Institution of South Wales, Swansea. XCIV, p. 21, 1939.
- Excavation at the Knave promontory fort, Rhosilli, Glamorgan. XCIV, p. 210, 1939.
- The excavation of Bishopston Valley promontory fort, Glamorgan. XCV, p. 9, 1940
- The excavation of High Pennard promontory fort, Glamorgan. XCVI, p. 23, 1941
- Two Bronze Age barrows, Fairwood Common, Gower, Glamorgan. XCVIII, p. 52, 1944
- More Roman pottery from Basingwerk Abbey. XCIX. p. 256, 1945.
- A promontory fort, Henllan, Cardiganshire. XCIX, p. 226, 1945.
- Clegyr Voia, St. Davids, Pembrokeshire (excavation in 1943). CII, p. 20, 1952.

=== Other publications ===
- Excavations at Langford Downs, Oxon. (near Leachdale) in 1943. Oxon., 11–12, 1947.
- Roman Canterbury 1944, Medici Society, 1947.
- Roman Canterbury 1945, Medici Society, 1948.
- Excavations at Allard's Quarry, Marnhull, Dorset, Proceedings Dorset Natural History and Archaeological Society, 72, 1951
- Excavations at Board Mill, Stanton Harcourt, Oxon. 16, 1951

With Sheppard Frere:

- Roman Canterbury 1945–1946, Medici Society, 1949.
- Roman Canterbury: the City of Duroverum 1947–1953.
