= Bloomberg tablets =

Ancient tablets

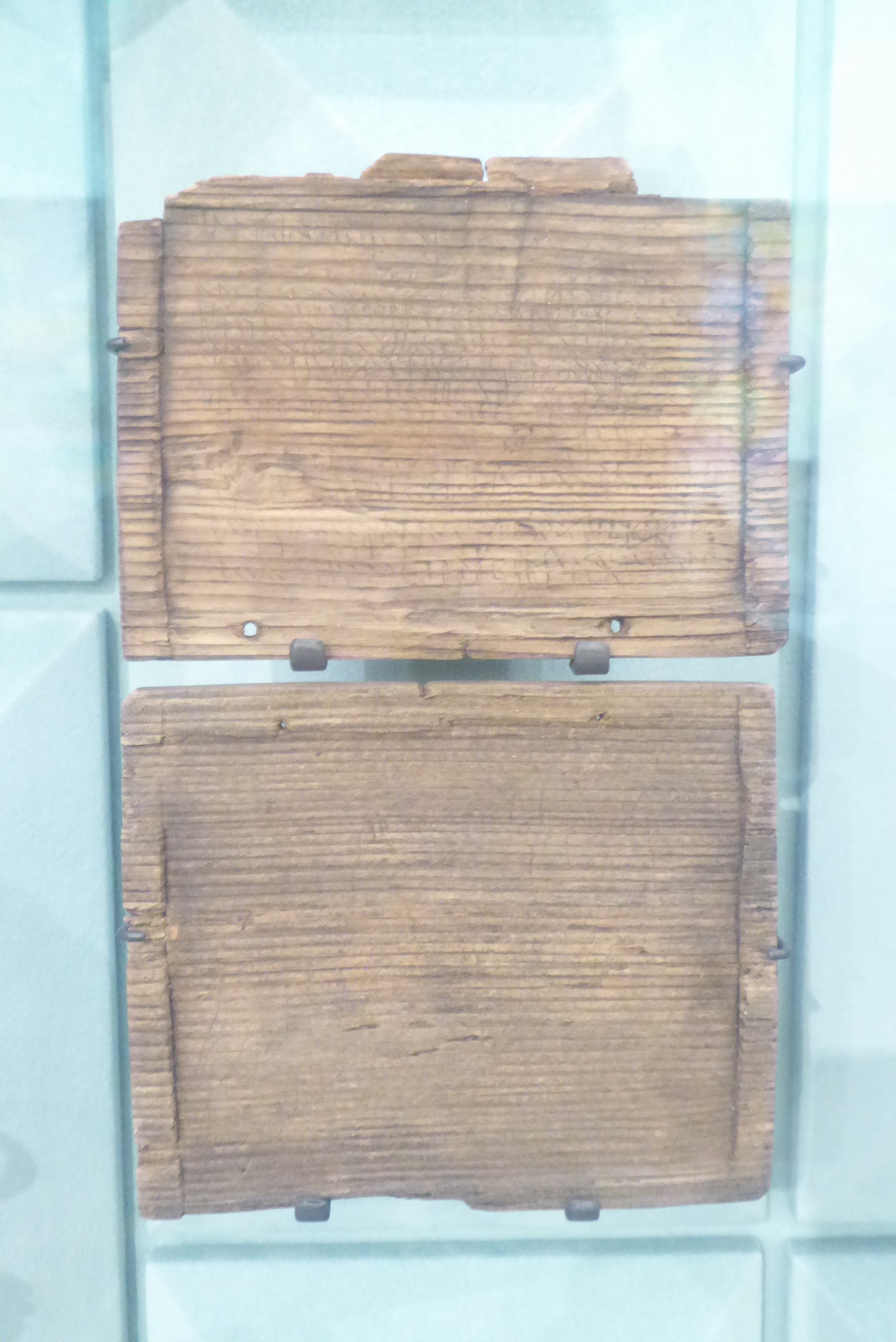
Two Bloomberg tablets

The Bloomberg tablets are a collection of 405 preserved wooden tablets that were found at the site of the Bloomberg building in the financial district of London. Excavations of the site took place between 2010 and 2013, after which the current Bloomberg building was constructed on the site of the archaeological dig.

The tablets are the earliest written documents found in Britain, dating from 50 to 80 AD in the early Roman period. These tablets predate the Vindolanda tablets, which were previously the earliest writing examples found in Britain, dating to 100 AD or later.

== Discovery ==
The Bloomberg site consists of three acres in what was the Roman city of Londinium. The archaeological site had previously yielded a 3rd-century Temple of Mithras, which was partially excavated in the 1950s, but this effort was incomplete, and Bucklersbury House, a 14-storey modernist office block, was built atop the site in 1953. However, the demolition of the Bucklersbury building in 2010 gave archaeologists a chance to reopen the dig. Between 2010 and 2013, a multitude of artefacts were discovered at the site, including the Bloomberg tablets, discovered buried 40 feet underground.

The Bloomberg tablets were an unexpected find, as organic material such as wood and leather tends to rot away and disintegrate with time. The tablets were preserved by the thick, wet mud generated by the underground river Walbrook, which limited the exposure of the tablets to oxygen. Though there was limited exposure to oxygen, the tablets were originally found in a waterlogged condition. They were then cleaned under running water with a soft brush so as to not damage the tablets and preserve the contents.

== Construction ==
The tablets were originally made of wood and wax, though only the wood was preserved and recoverable. A typical tablet would have been made of a thin piece of wood, 15–25 cm wide, with a rectangular depression carved into the centre. Warm beeswax, blackened by the addition of atramentum, would then be poured into the centre depression and allowed to cool. Once the wax had set, a metal stylus would be used to scratch letters into the wax, showing a lighter colour against the darker wax.

These wax tablets could be recycled, in that the tablet could be heated (to approximately 50 °C), allowing the wax to soften and reform a smooth writing surface. The tablets were likely made from wood recycled from barrel staves, and often were made in diptych style, where two tablets were loosely linked and could fold together to close, like a book with only two pages, protecting the soft wax on the inside. Evidence suggests the tablets were made from staves due to the discovery of several staves and glazing objects at the site alongside the tablets. These staves are of the same type of wood (silver fir) as the tablets. However there were two ink leaf tablets inscribed with a pen that were discovered at the same site.

== Modern efforts ==
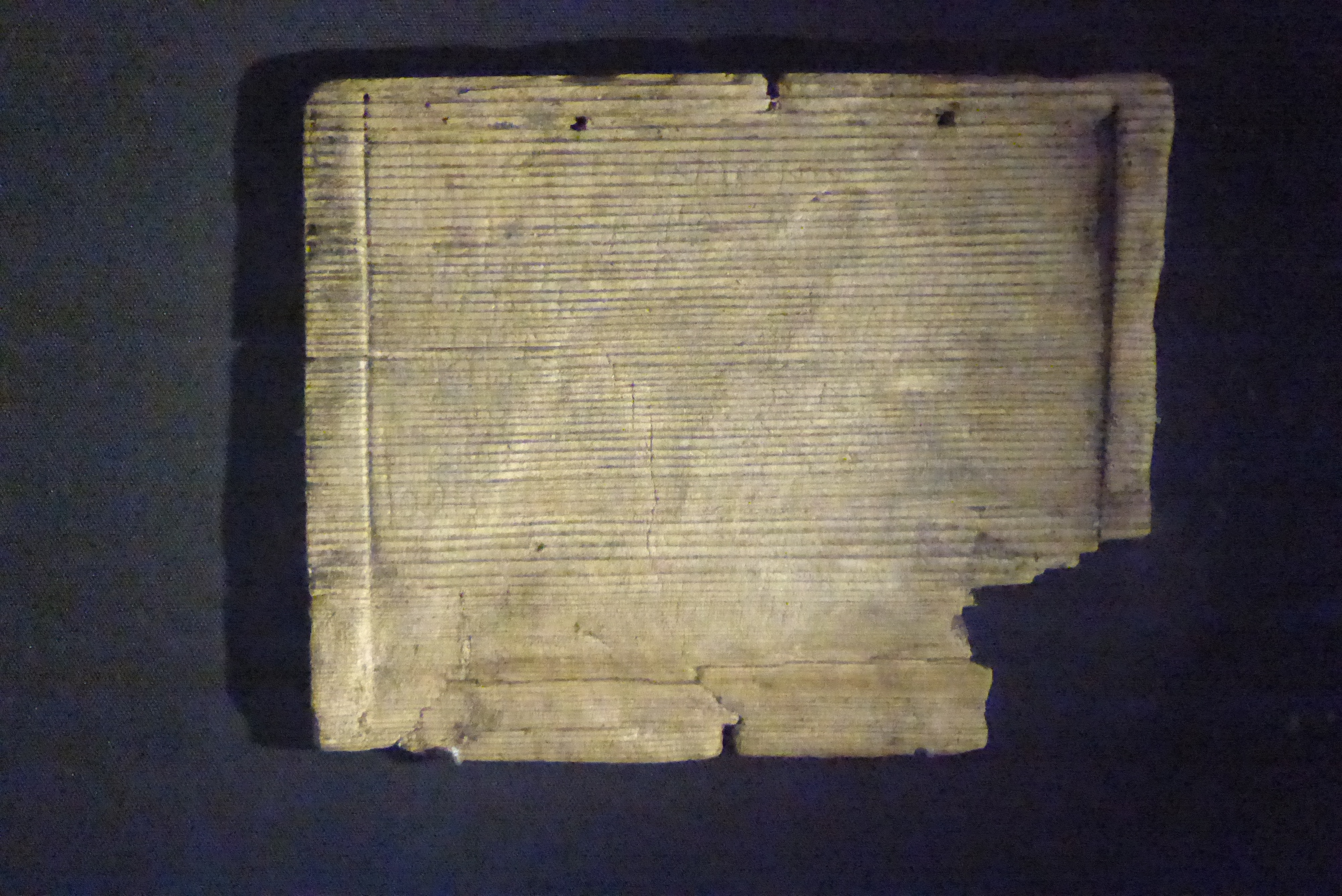
Bloomberg wooden writing board

=== Re-creation ===
Although the wax from the tablets was not preserved, small scratches left on the surface of the wooden tablets allowed for a recreation of the original writing content. These scratches, though perhaps not identifiable with the naked eye, can be visualised and digitally recreated with the assistance of technology. To make the digital recreation of the writing, photographs were taken using different angles of light and thus casting different shadows upon the tablet surface. Once compiled, these pictures gave a view of the surface contours of the tablets, the impressions made in the wood, and thus a look at what was written on the tablet. However, since these tablets were made to be reusable, several overlapping messages may be present on the tablets, making it even more difficult to separate and translate the many messages.

=== Translation ===
Ninety of the Bloomberg tablets have been translated. This is the highest number of translated artefacts from any comparable archaeological site in London, surpassing the previous record of 19. Alongside the 90 translated tablets are another 91 stylus tablets, all of which have been inscribed but are considered illegible. The 90 translated tablets have been grouped according to the content translated within, 43 of these tablets contained general correspondence, 25 of them were financial or legal documentation, 8 tablets were book keeping accounts showing what people owed and the remaining 14 are miscellaneous. The tablets were translated by Dr Roger Tomlin, an expert in Roman cursive, the writing style in which the tablets were written.

Tablets vary in content, including the oldest financial document from London (dating to 8 January 57 AD), about 3 to 4 years before the city was destroyed by Boudica. It also documents how the Roman government responded with their military and how soon the city recovered thereafter. Legal documents include a judge calling a pretrial hearing, and educational material. One tablet shows the alphabet written out, indicating the presence of perhaps the first school in Britain. Additionally, among the tablets there are over 100 names of people of all different professions and social classes who lived in London at the time, such as slaves, merchants, soldiers, and politicians. One prominent figure that is named is Julius Classicus, who was a commander in the Roman auxiliaries. One tablet contains the first mention of the name of the city of London, more than a half a century earlier than was previously thought to be the first naming of London, in the Annals of Tacitus. Another tablet said that Verulamium supplied London with provisions and not vice versa as had been thought originally. All of these legal documents were in the wax tablets, however the ink leaf tablets are believed to have contained more short-lived correspondences.

=== Preservation ===
Although current technology and methods have allowed for recreation and translation of many tablets, the vast majority of them remain illegible. Thus, to keep these tablets in prime shape for future analysis, efforts are being made to keep these artefacts preserved. Preservation included a combination of immersion in polyethylene glycol and freeze drying.

== Display ==
While some of the tablets are being preserved for future study, some will be displayed in a museum exhibit entitled "London Mithraeum" located on the first two floors of the Bloomberg European Headquarters, which opened in November 2017.

== Online Publication ==
All of the Bloomberg Tablets have been digitized and may be viewed online at Roman Inscriptions of Britain Online. (Note: See Roman Inscriptions of Britain Online.)
