= Mercury House (London building) =

Office building in Holborn, London

Coordinates: 51.5199°N 0.1200°W

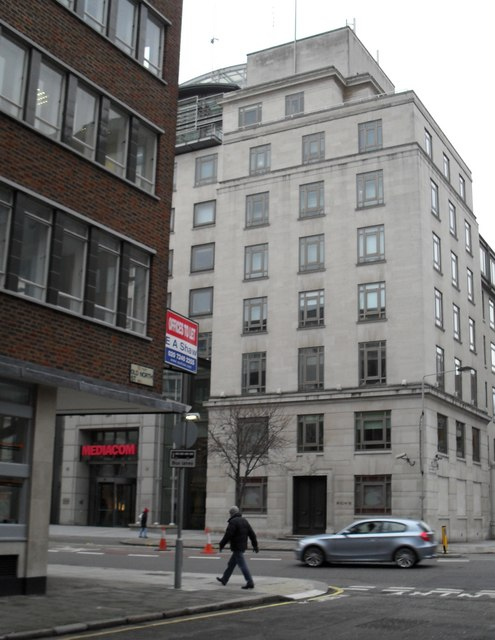
The junction of Old North Street and Theobald's Road

Mercury House is an office building at 124, Theobalds Road, Holborn, London. It was the headquarters of Cable & Wireless from 1955. It was opened by John Reith and was named after the Roman god.

The architect was Gordon Jeeves. The interiors were designed by H C Upton, Cable & Wireless's own architect. The three glass panels in the entrance were the work of John Hutton.

The building has been home to MediaCom since December 2006.
