= London Mithraeum =

Mithraeum in the United Kingdom

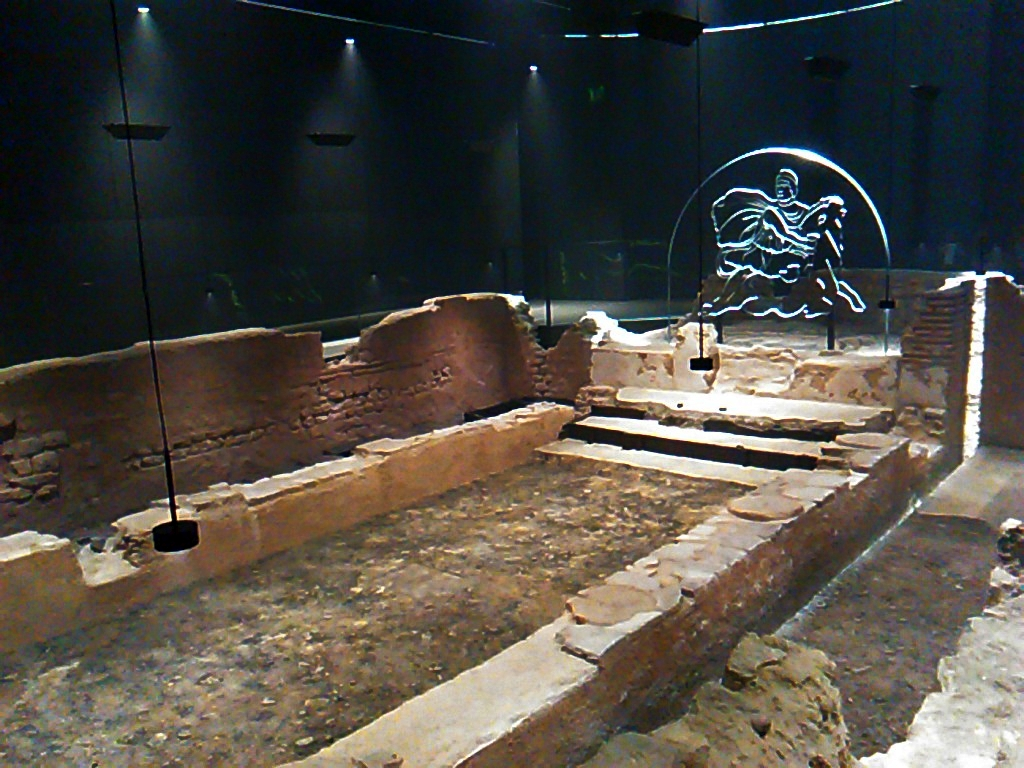
- The Mithraeum in 2017, in the Bloomberg Space

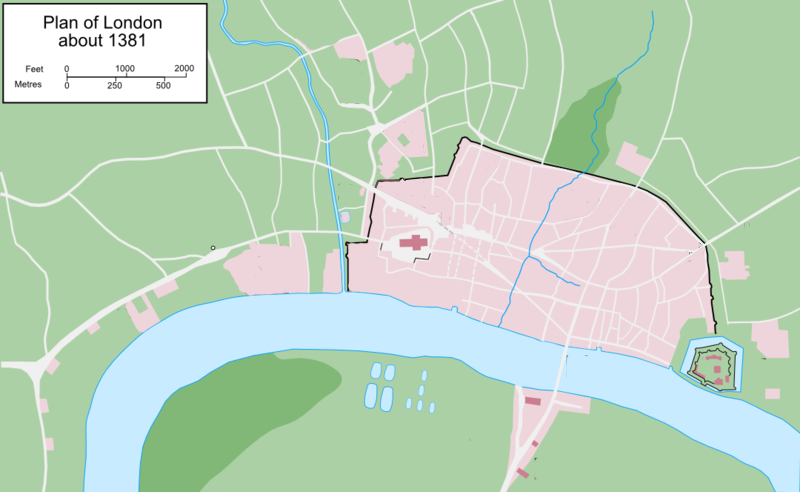
- Shown within the City of London Shown compared to the city in the 14th century
- 51°30′45″N 00°05′26.16″W
- Type: Sanctuary
- Periods: Roman Imperial
- Location: 12 Walbrook, London, EC4

Site notes
- Excavation dates: 1954, 2010–2014
- Archaeologists: W. F. Grimes
- Discovered: 1954
- Website: London Mithraeum

The London Mithraeum, also known as the Temple of Mithras, Walbrook, is a Roman Mithraeum that was discovered in Walbrook, a street in the City of London, during a building's construction in 1954. The entire site was relocated to permit continued construction and this temple of the mystery god Mithras became perhaps the most famous 20th-century Roman discovery in London.

== Excavation and artefacts ==
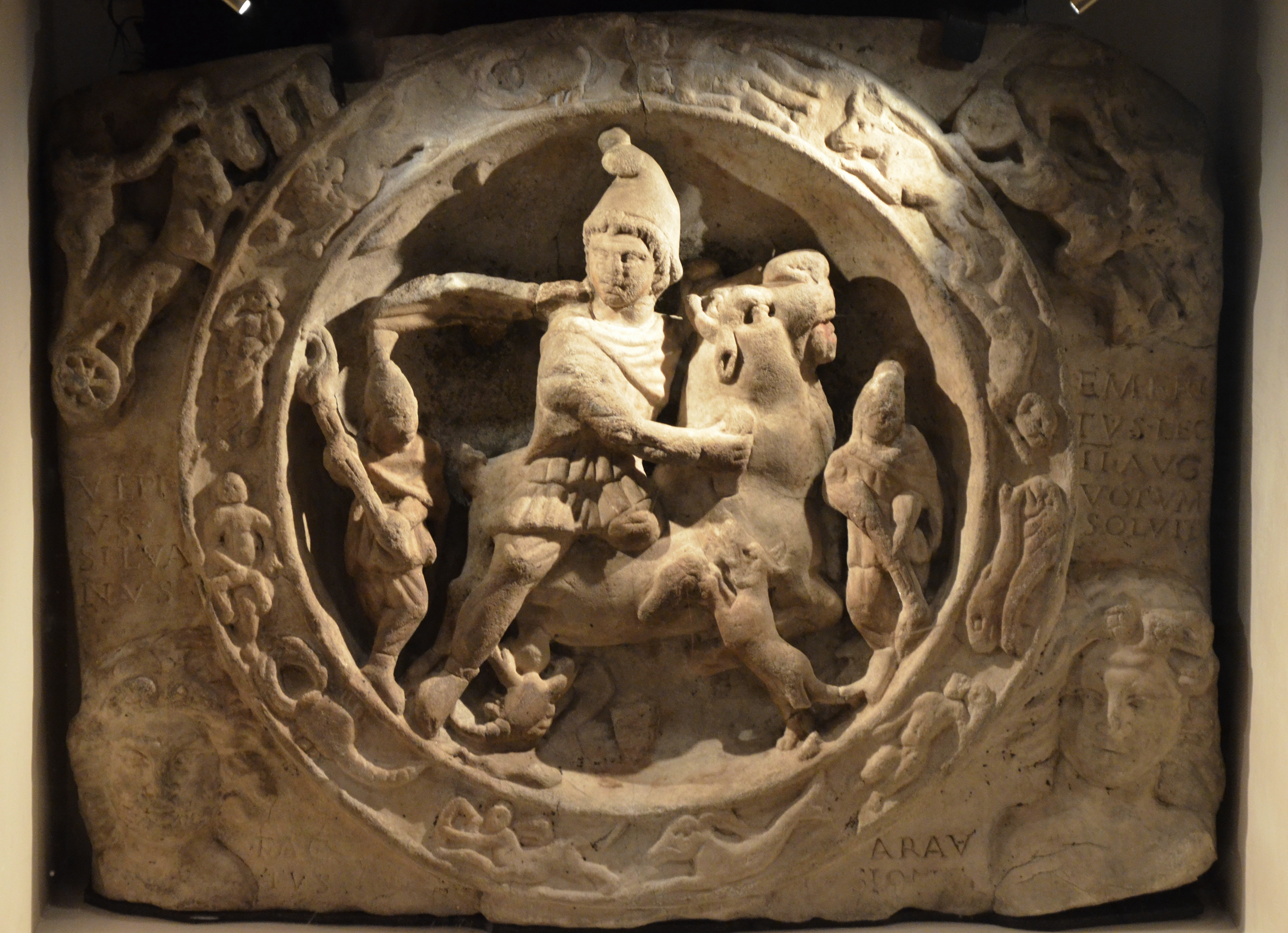
White marble relief depicting Mithras slaying the bull, found at the Walbrook site and put on display at the Museum of London (as of 2024 closed for redevelopment)

The site was excavated by W. F. Grimes, director of the Museum of London, and Audrey Williams in 1954. The temple, initially hoped to have been an early Christian church, was built in the mid-3rd century (Note: It was dated to the mid-second century in Maarten J. Vermaseren, "The New Mithraic Temple in London" Numen 2.1/2 (January 1955), pp. 139-145.) and dedicated to Mithras or perhaps jointly to several deities popular among Roman soldiers. Then it was rededicated, probably to Bacchus, in the early fourth century. Found within the temple, where they had been carefully buried at the time of its rededication, were finely detailed third-century white marble likenesses of Minerva, Mercury the guide of the souls of the dead, and the syncretic gods Mithras and Serapis, imported from Italy. There were several coarser locally made clay figurines of Venus, combing her hair. The artefacts recovered were put on display in the Museum of London.

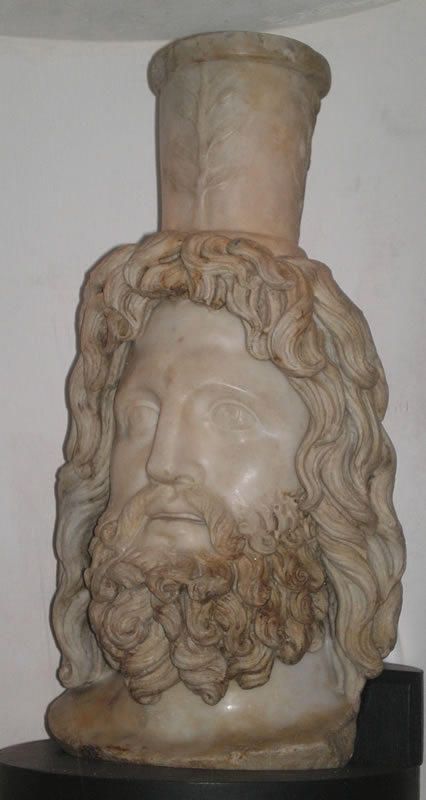
Head of Serapis found in the 1954 excavations

Among the sculptures the archaeologists found was a head of Mithras himself, recognizable by his Phrygian cap. The base of the head is tapered to fit a torso, which was not preserved.

Artefacts found in Walbrook in 1889 probably came from the Mithraeum, according to the archaeologist Ralph Merrifield, although this was not identified at the time. One was a marble relief, 0.53 m (1 ft 9 in) tall, of Mithras in the act of killing the astral bull, the Tauroctony that was as central to Mithraism as the Crucifixion is to Christianity. On it Mithras is accompanied by the two small figures of the torch-bearing celestial twins of Light and Darkness, Cautes and Cautopates, within the cosmic annual wheel of the zodiac. At the top left, outside the wheel, Sol–Helios ascends the heavens in his biga; at top right Luna descends in her chariot. The heads of two wind-gods, Boreas and Zephyros, are in the bottom corners. It bears the inscription

VLPIVS SILVANVS EMERITVS LEG II AVG VOTVM SOLVIT FACTVS ARAVSIONE

which may be translated "Ulpius Silvanus, veteran soldier of the Second Augustan Legion, in fulfilment of a vow, makes this altar [as the result of] a vision" or "Ulpius Silvanus, veteran of the Second Legion Augusta, fulfilled his vow having become (a Mithraist) at Orange".

Nearby were buried heads of the Roman goddess Minerva and a finely detailed bearded head of Serapis, Jupiter-like in his features but securely recognizable by the grain-basket, the modius, upon his head, a token of resurrection.

Inscription from the London Mithraeum, dated AD 307/308

An inscription dateable AD 307–308 at the site

PRO SALVTE D N CCCC ET NOB CAES DEO MITHRAE ET SOLI INVICTO AB ORIENTE AD OCCIDENTEM

may be translated "For the Salvation of our lords the four emperors and the noble Caesar, and to the god Mithras, the Invincible Sun from the east to the west".

Prior to the construction of the Bloomberg London building, Museum of London Archaeology led a team of over 50 archaeologists in further excavation of the site between 2010 and 2013. Their work recovered more than 14,000 items, including a large assembly of tools. The varied objects are thought to have been brought to the site in landfills and soils collected elsewhere and laid down to improve the marshy banks of the River Walbrook during the rebuilding of London after the Boudican revolt of AD 60 or 61.

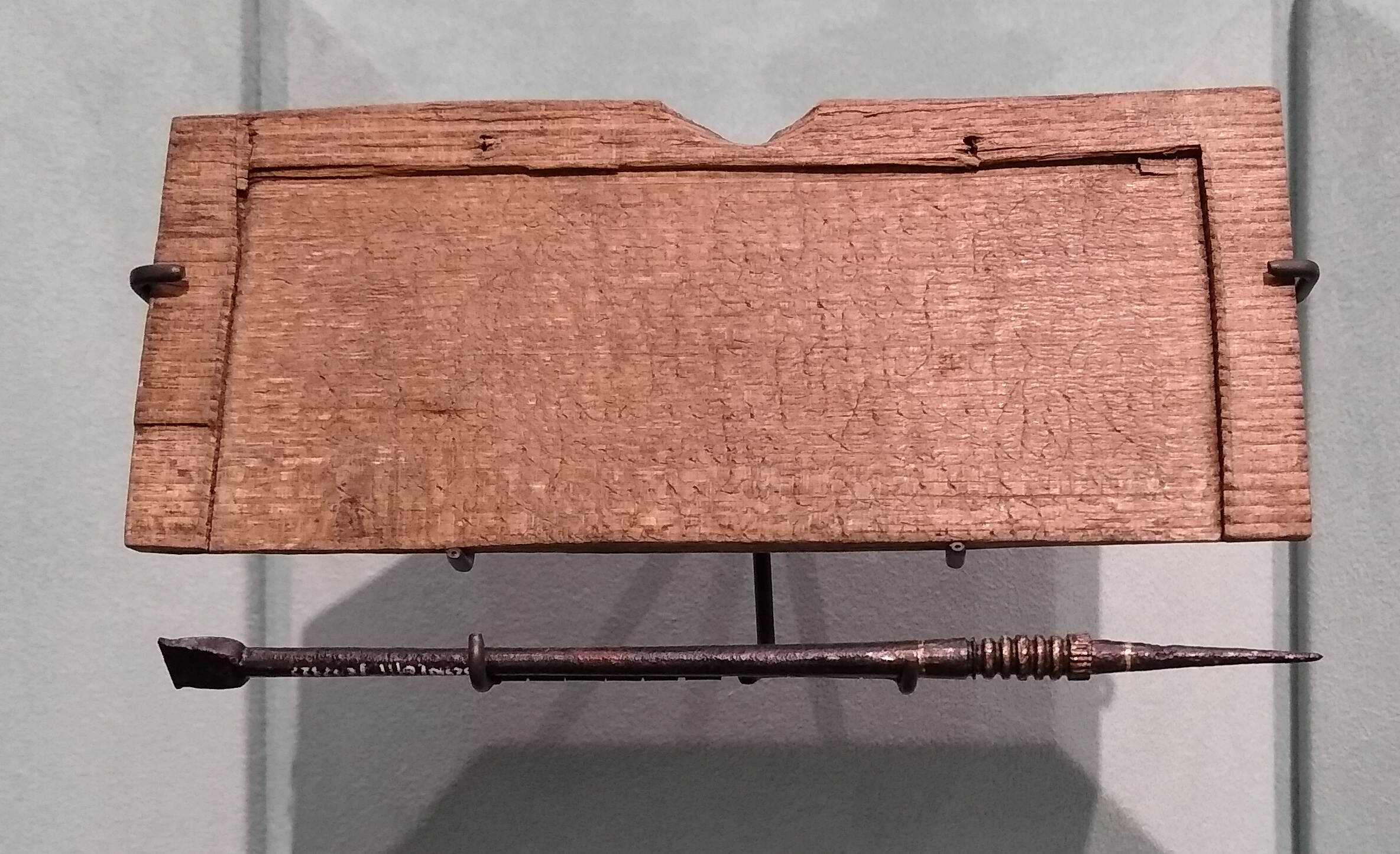
A stylus and writing tablet, the oldest record of a commercial transaction in the City of London

The waterlogged soil conditions in this location preserved even organic material like leather shoes and an assembly of over 400 wooden writing tablets, collectively known as the Bloomberg tablets. The tablets originally held a layer of dark wax and messages were scratched into the wax with a stylus that revealed the paler wood underneath. The wax has perished, but the words were reconstructed from scratch marks left in the wood. Among the messages is the oldest financial document from London, dated AD 57, and two addresses from AD 62 and AD 70 containing the earliest mention of London.

== Relocation history ==
The Roman temple, when it was originally built, would have stood on the east bank of the now covered-over River Walbrook, a key freshwater source in Roman Londinium. Nearby, in its former streambed, a small square hammered lead sheet was found, on which an enemy of someone named Martia Martina had inscribed her name backwards and thrown the token into the stream, in a traditional Celtic way of reaching the gods that has preserved metal tokens in rivers throughout Celtic Europe, from the swords at La Tène to Roman times (compare wishing well.) The temple foundations are very close to other important sites in the city of London including the historic London Stone, the Bank of England and London Wall. The original Mithraeum was built partly underground, recalling the cave of Mithras where the Mithraic epiphany took place.

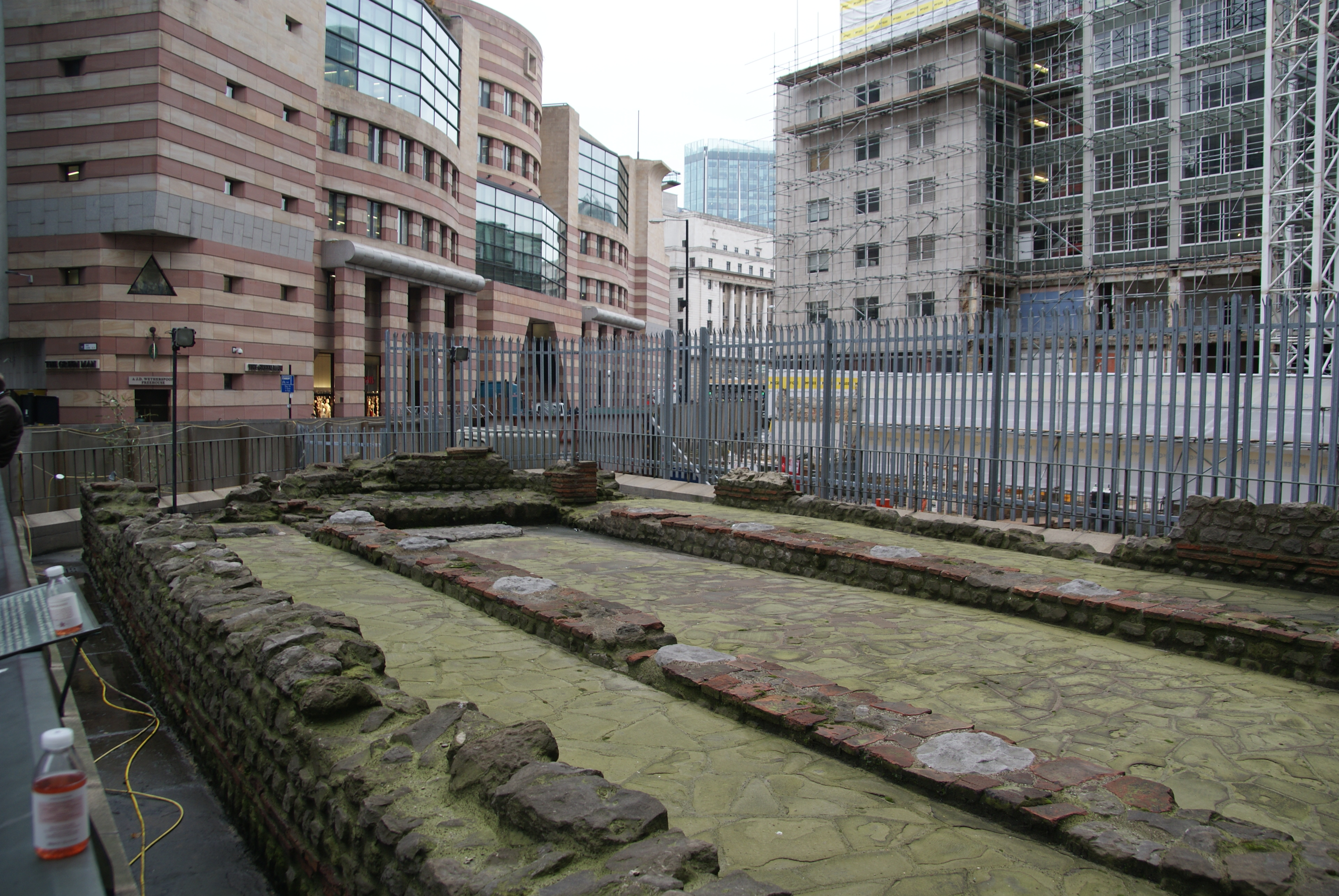
The Mithraeum in 2004 when reassembled at Temple Court, Queen Victoria Street, EC4

The temple site was uncovered in September 1954 during excavation work for the construction of Bucklersbury House, a 14-storey modernist office block to house Legal & General. As a compromise between redesigning the new building and abandoning the archaeological site, the ruin was dismantled and moved 100 metres (330 ft) to Temple Court, Queen Victoria Street, where in 1962 the foundations were reassembled at street level for an open-air public display. The reconstruction was not accurate and drew criticism for the materials used. An interim report on the excavation included in W. F. Grimes, The Excavation of Roman and Mediaeval London (1968) was superseded by John Shepherd, The Temple of Mithras, Walbrook (an English Heritage monograph) (1998).

In 2007 plans were drawn up to return the Mithraeum to its original location, following the demolition of Bucklersbury House and four other buildings in the block for the planned creation of a new Walbrook Square development, designed by Foster and Partners and Jean Nouvel Architects. However, redesigns and disputes between freeholders Legal & General and Metrovacesa, who had agreed to buy the project, resulted in the Walbrook Square project being put on hold in October 2008, when Bovis Lend Lease removed their project team. Metrovacesa left the project in August 2009. In May 2010 the Mithraeum remained in situ at Temple Court, though in the same month there was talk of reviving the Walbrook Square project.

The Walbrook Square project was purchased by the Bloomberg company in 2010, which decided to restore the Mithraeum to its original site as part of their new European headquarters opened in 2017. The new site is 7 metres (23 ft) below the modern street level in an exhibition space beneath the Bloomberg London building. The temple was moved a little west of its original position to preserve parts of the walls that were not uncovered in 1952–1954 and are too fragile to display today.

The ruins are reconstructed as they appeared at the end of the excavation in October 1954, reflecting the first building phase of around AD 240 without any later Roman additions to the site. A large majority of the stones and bricks are original. The wood, render and lime mortar are new, but based on mortar samples from contemporary Roman London structures. The temple is displayed with a selection of artefacts found on the site.

== See also ==
- Roman sites in the United Kingdom
- Mithraism
- Rudchester Mithraeum on Hadrian's Wall
- Caernarfon Mithraeum at Segontium in North Wales
- Bloomberg tablets
- Roman London

== Sources ==
- Bloomberg (2017). London Mithraeum Bloomberg SPACE guide (Booklet). London: Bloomberg L.P.
- Bryan, Jessica; Cubitt, Rachel S.; Hill, Julian; Holder, Nick; Jackson, Sophie; Watson, Sadie (2017). Wright, Susan M. (ed.). Archaeology at Bloomberg (PDF). London: MOLA.
- Collingwood, R. G.; Wright, R. P. (1965). The Roman Inscriptions of Britain. Vol. 3, 4. Oxford University Press.
- Merrifield, Ralph (1965). The Roman City of London. London: Benn.
