= Bloomberg London =

Coordinates: 51.5125°N 0.0909°W

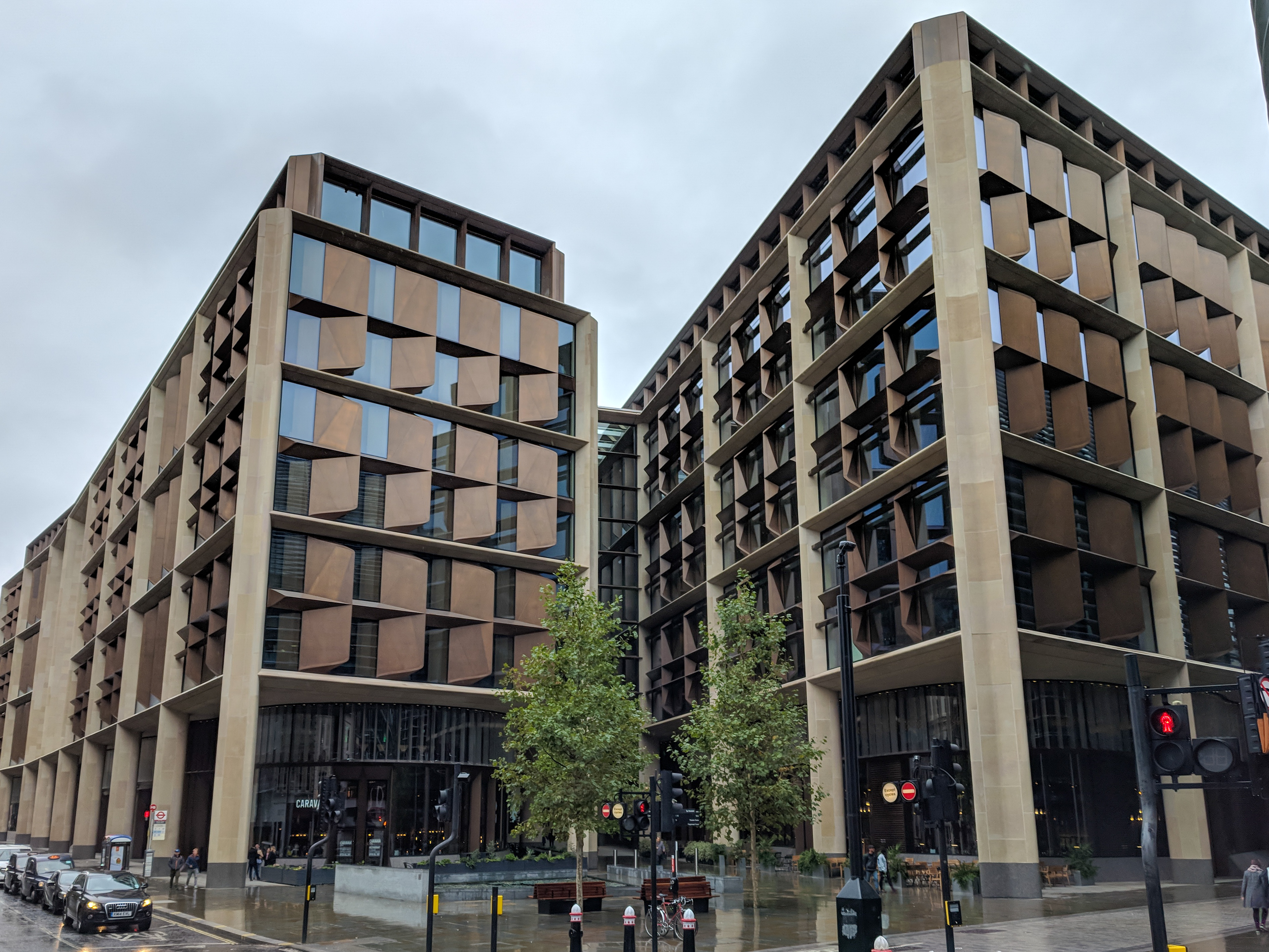
- The building viewed from the junction of Cannon Street and Walbrook
- Interactive map of the Bloomberg London area
- Alternative names: Bloomberg European Headquarters

General information
- Status: Completed
- Location: London, 3 Queen Victoria Street
- Opened: October 2017; 8 years ago
- Cost: £1 billion
- Owner: Bloomberg L.P.

Design and construction
- Architecture firm: Foster and Partners
- Structural engineer: AKT II
- Main contractor: Sir Robert McAlpine
- Awards: Stirling Prize

Bloomberg London is an office building in the City of London, which was opened in 2017. It is owned by Bloomberg L.P. and functions as their European headquarters. It is at 3 Queen Victoria Street, to the west of Walbrook, on the site previously occupied by Bucklersbury House.

== Design and build ==
The building was designed by architects Foster and Partners with structural engineer AKT II, and constructed by Sir Robert McAlpine at a cost of £1bn. It consists of two buildings, divided by a covered arcade. The buildings are linked by bridges. The arcade contains several restaurants, and reinstates part of Watling Street, an ancient Roman road. Prior to construction, archaeological digs at the construction site yielded a collection of Roman-era inscribed wooden writing tablets now known as the Bloomberg tablets.

The building is clad in 9,600 tonnes of Derbyshire sandstone with bronze ventilation fins. Inside, the floors are linked by custom glass lifts and a 210m helical bronze "ramp", which dominates the interior of the building. The cores of the building are on the outside, to create a single open-plan space inside. Express lifts take visitors from the lobby, a self-supporting "vortex" of three curved timber shells, to the double-height pantry on the sixth floor, with view of St Paul's Cathedral. Then visitors must take a second lift or use the ramp to access other floors. The building houses 4,000 staff, with room to expand. All desks are electric adjustable-height.

The building features artwork by Olafur Eliasson and other artists. Outside, there is a three-part sculpture called "Forgotten Streams" by Cristina Iglesias, which evokes the Walbrook river.

In 2018, the RIBA awarded the Stirling Prize to Bloomberg London.

== Energy usage ==
The building is noted for its energy-efficiency. It achieved a 98.5% score against the BREEAM sustainability assessment method, the highest design-stage score ever achieved by any major office development. Rainwater is collected from the roof to supply the vacuum toilets. The office floors are illuminated with 500,000 LEDs. The ceilings are custom aluminium "petals", inspired by the pressed metal ceilings of New York, which act as light diffusers, cooling elements and acoustic attenuation.

The design and building process of the building has been criticised as wasteful: it required developing specialised solutions not applicable anywhere else, and the construction required 600 tonnes of Japanese bronze and 10,000 tonnes of imported Indian granite, rather than using locally sourced or recycled materials.

== Bank Tube station entrance ==
As part of the construction of the building, a new entrance to London Underground's Bank and Monument station complex was built. This provides direct access to the Waterloo & City line via four new escalators and two lifts – providing step free access for the first time. Construction of the new entrance began in November 2015, and the new entrance was officially opened by Mayor of London Sadiq Khan and former Mayor of New York Michael Bloomberg in December 2018.

The new entrance incorporates etched glass panels by artist John Hutton, depicting 66 figures based on the ancient Roman history of the area, including the Roman Temple of Mithras. The artwork was originally completed in 1962 on Bucklersbury House, the post war office building previously located on the site.

== Mithraeum ==
The building is on top of the site of the London Mithraeum, the remnants of a Roman temple. The Mithraeum was relocated to a different site in 1962, but as part of the construction of Bloomberg London it was relocated to close to its original site. It is open to the public.

The building also contains the Bloomberg Space, which displays artworks.

== Gallery ==
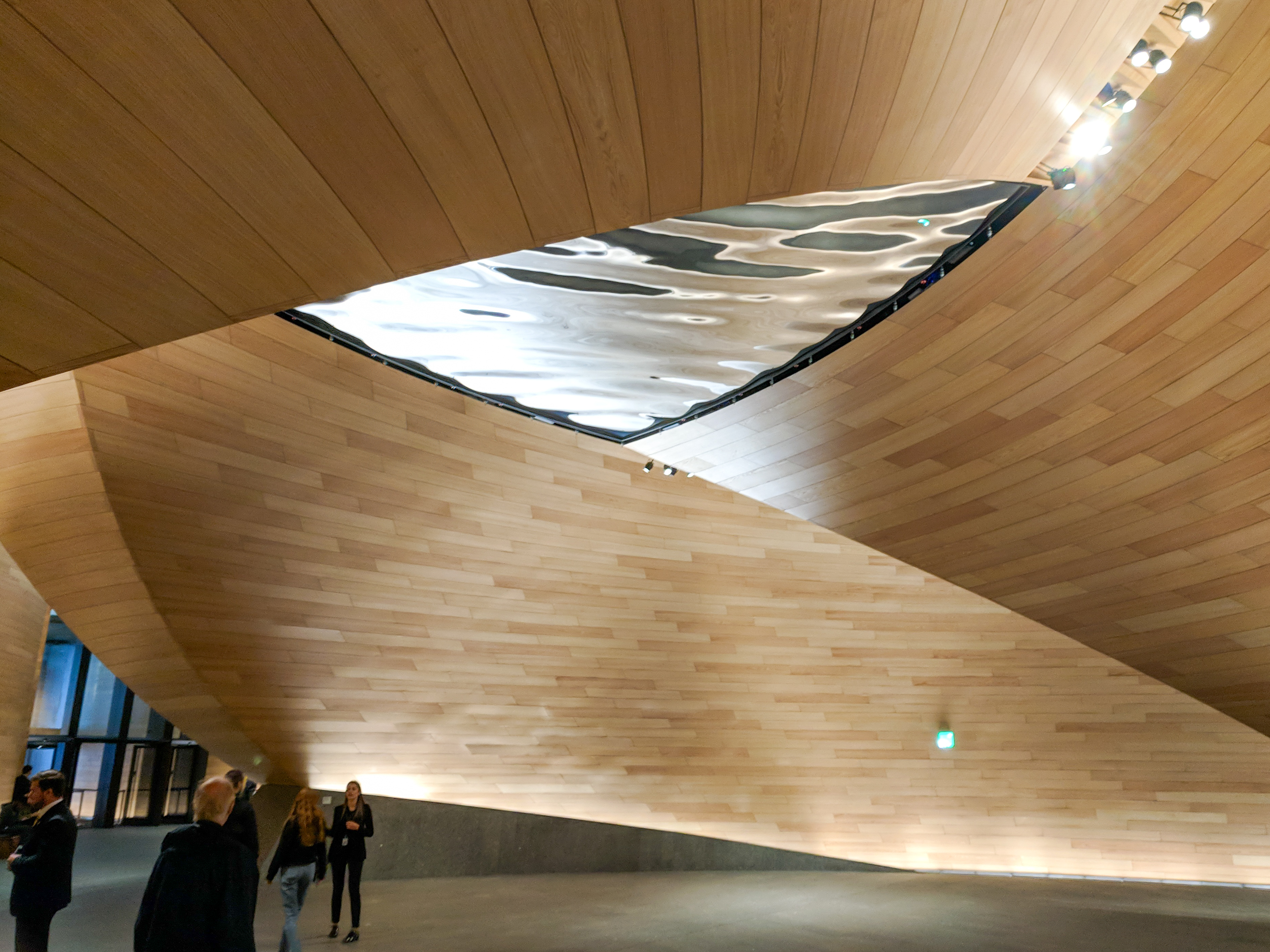
The main lobby or "vortex", with the artwork No future is possible without a past by Olafur Eliasson

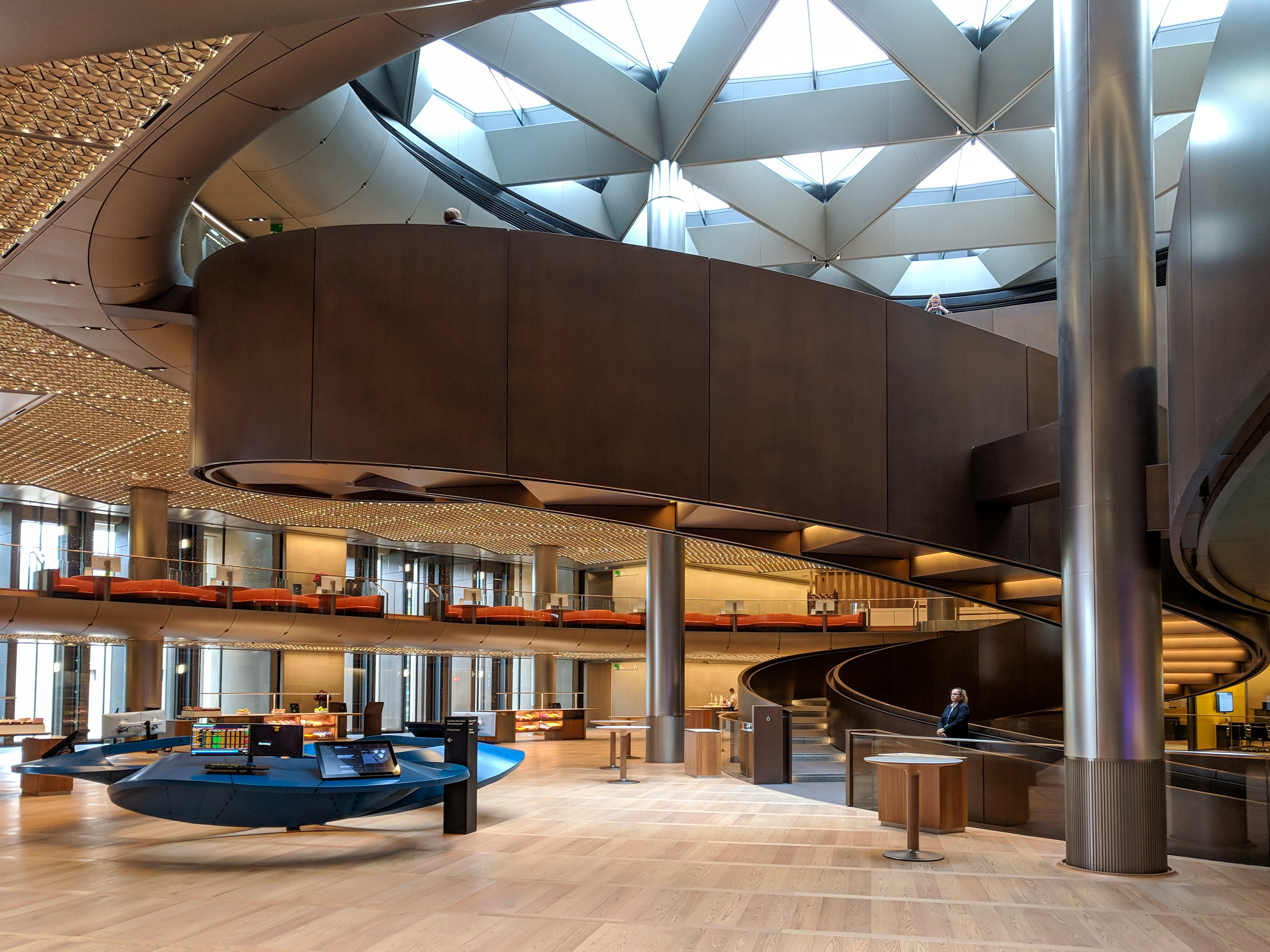
Part of the central ramp on the upper floors

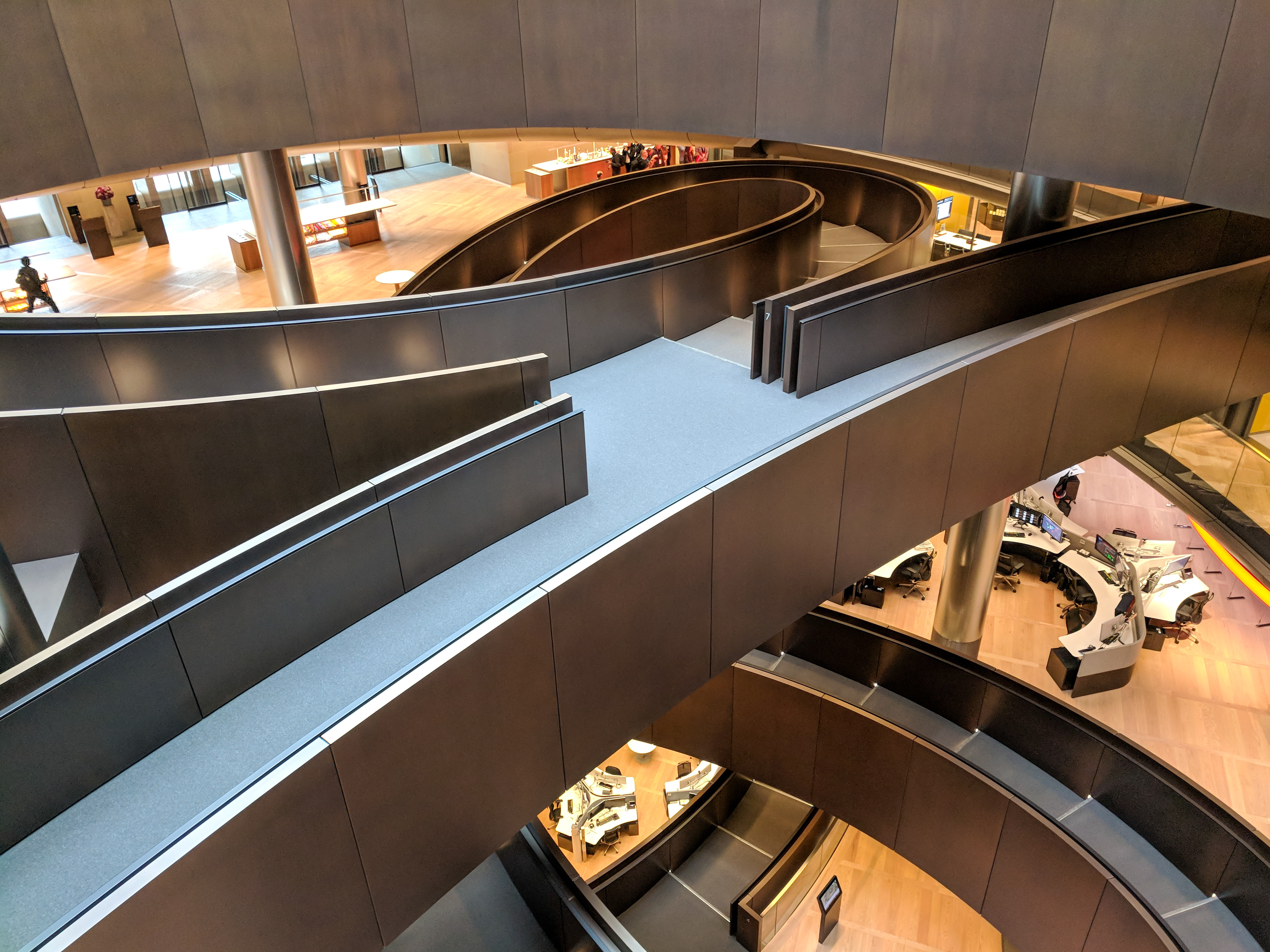
Looking down on the central ramp and lower floors

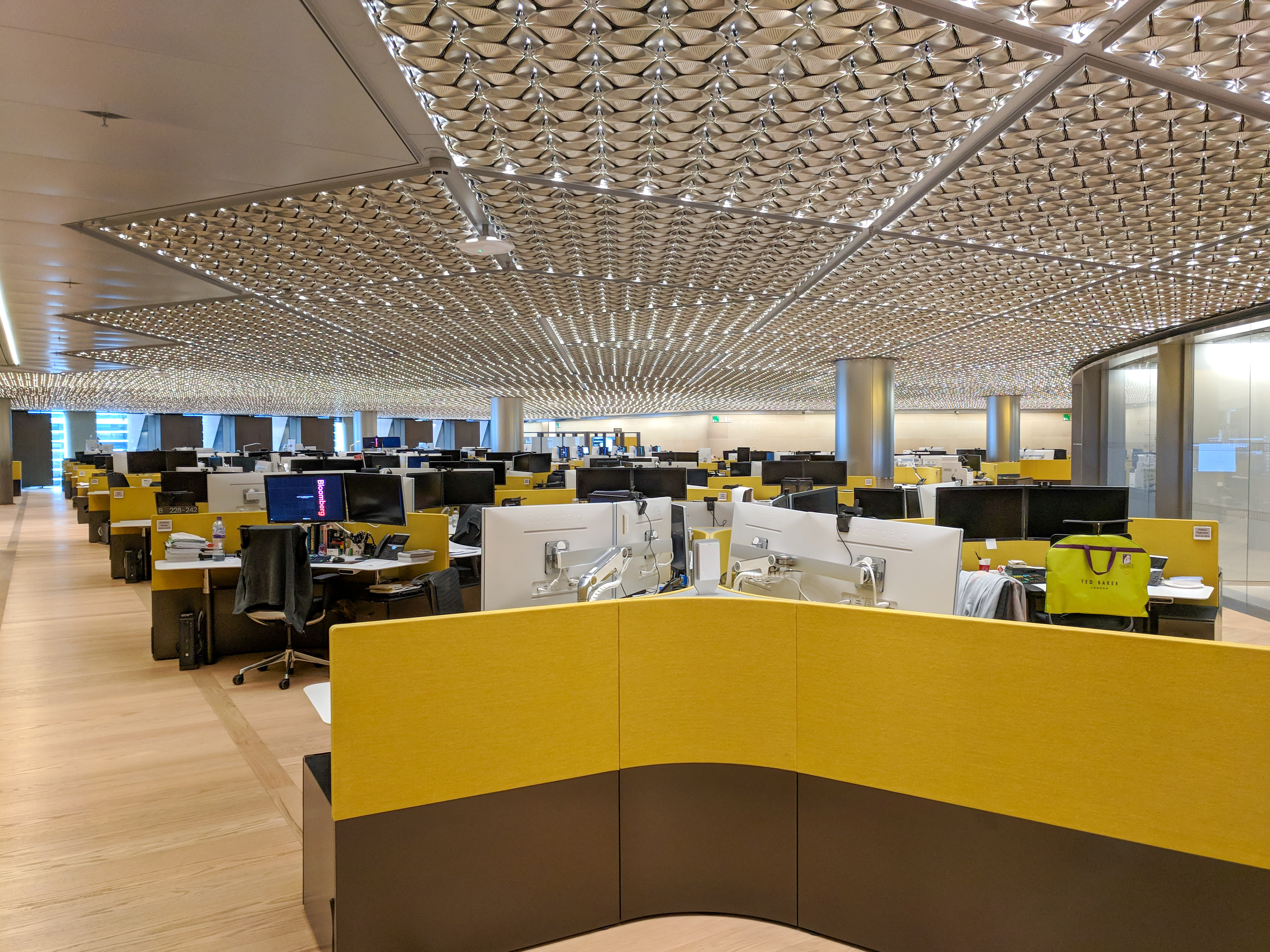
Office space, highlighting the aluminium ceiling "petals"

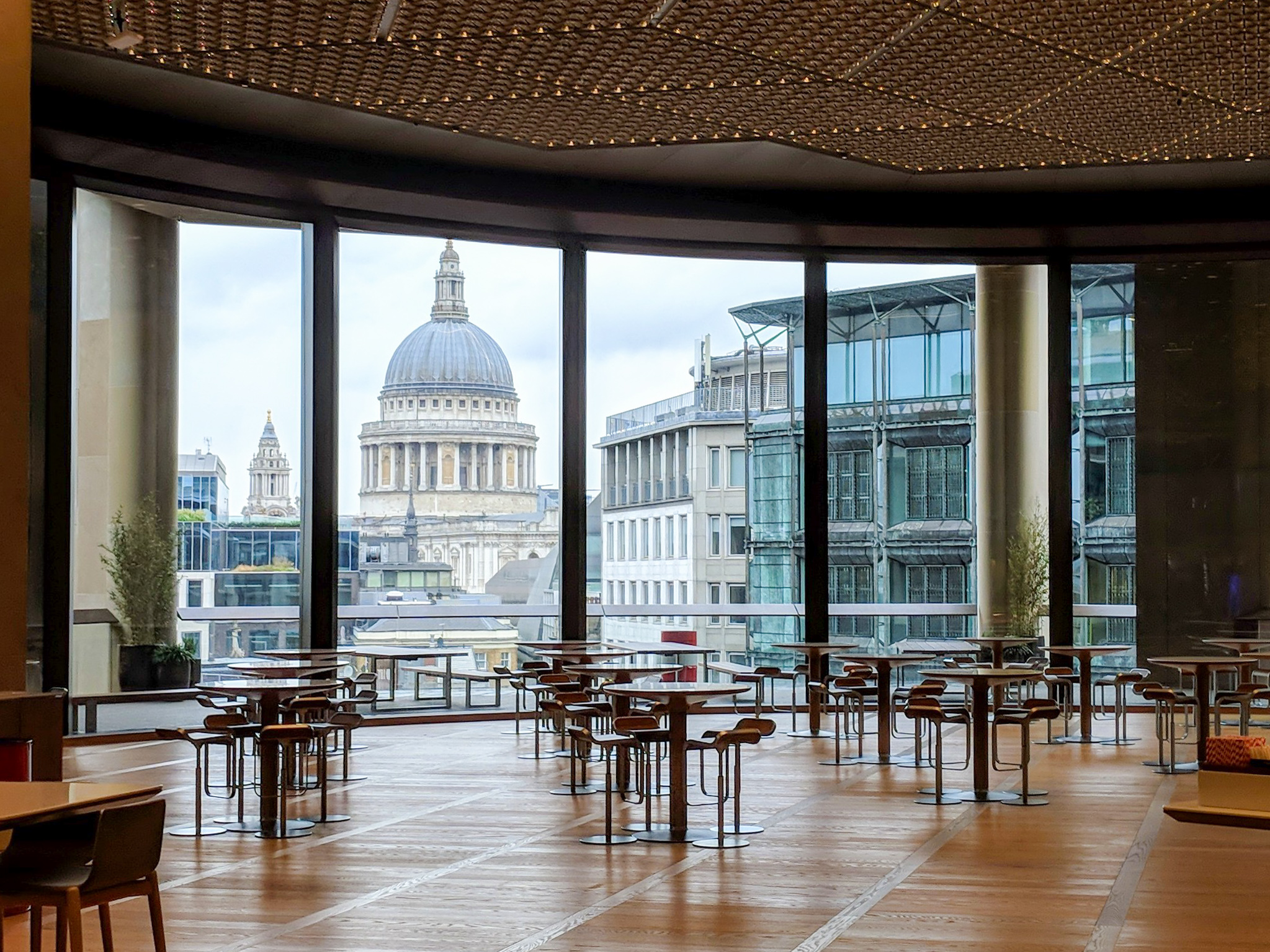
The double-height "pantry" space, with a view of St Paul's Cathedral

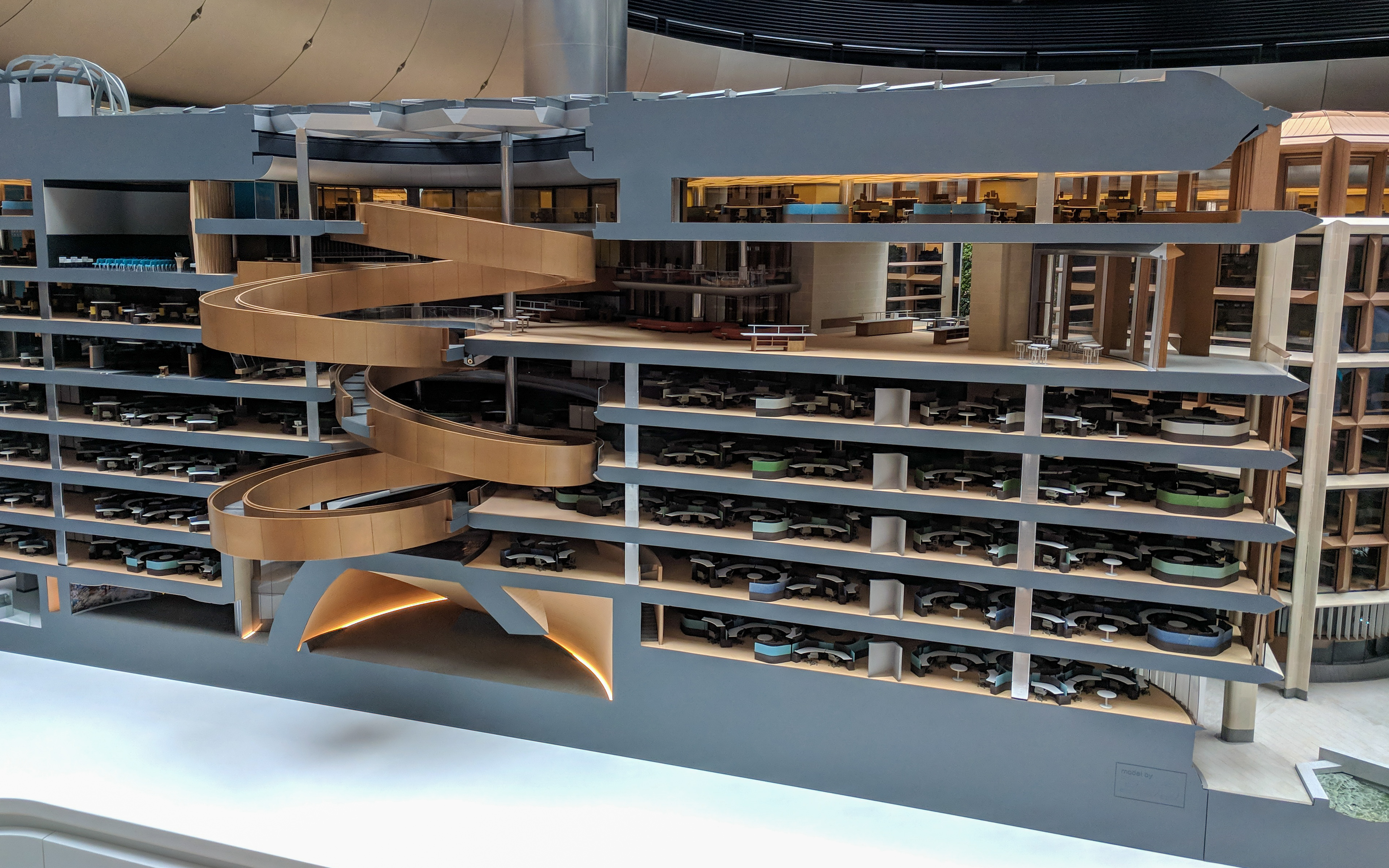
A cutaway model of the building
