= Pwlldu Bay =

Beach on the Gower Peninsula in Wales

Coordinates: 51.5634°N 4.0557°W

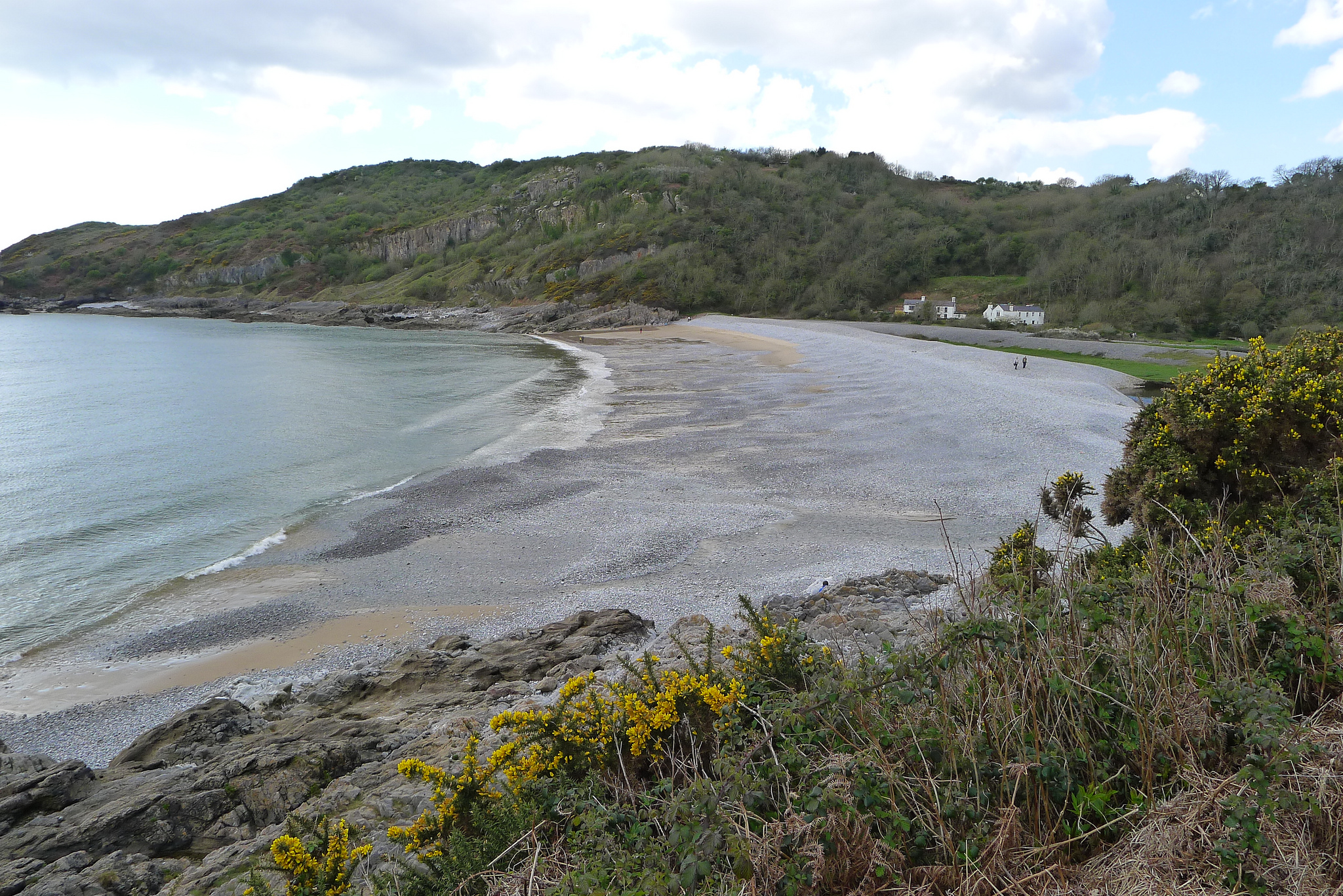
Pwlldu Bay 2012

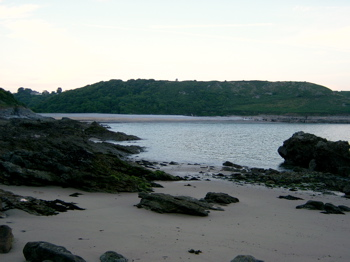
Pwlldu Bay

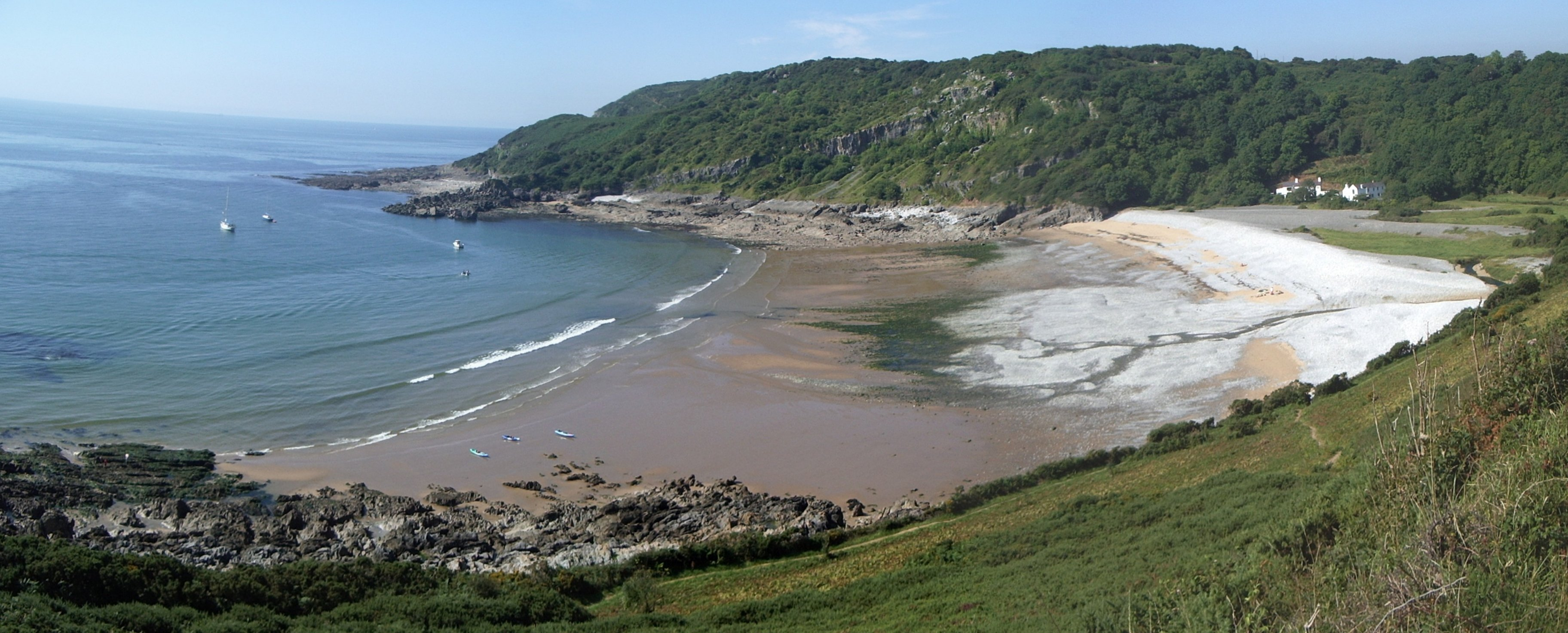
Pwlldu Bay from the east

Pwlldu Bay or Pwll Du Bay (Welsh: Bae Pwll Du) is a small beach on the south Gower Peninsula coast in south Wales. It is one of the more remote beaches and is not easily accessible by car, but there are several good footpaths leading to it.

There is a nearby gully called Grave's End marked by a circle of limestone rocks. A number of people from a shipwreck that was found on the bay were buried in this gully. The ship was the Caesar which was wrecked on the beach on 28 November 1760.

Pwlldu means "Black Pool" in Welsh
