= Bucklersbury House =

Demolished office block in London, England

Coordinates: 51.512805°N 0.090722°W

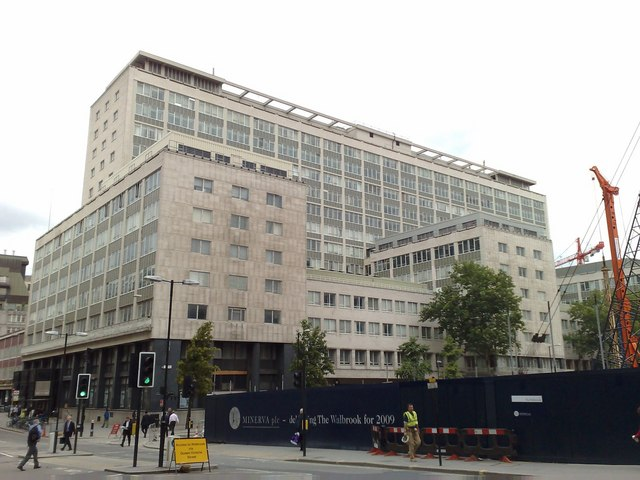
Bucklersbury House in 2007

Bucklersbury House was an office block that stood on Queen Victoria Street in the City of London.

== History and design ==
The block was constructed between 1953 and 1958 at No. 3 Queen Victoria Street by O. Campbell Jones & Sons. It was considered one of the largest office block developments of the 1950s in the city, and was 62 metres in height. The building had the distinction of being one of the first office buildings in London to break from following the street-line in its design, following intervention by the London County Council. It was also the first building to exceed the 30 metre height restriction that had been in place on buildings until the Second World War.

During construction, a temple of the ancient Roman Cult of Mithras was uncovered, now known as the London Mithraeum. Its unearthing was widely publicised and attracted crowds. It was moved about 90 metres away in 1962.

The building was closed in 2007, with planning permission granted to Jean Nouvel and Foster & Partners to redevelop the site as Walbrook Square under the ownership of Legal & General. The deal was abandoned, however, and Foster & Partners developed the site alone, with demolition carried out in 2010. The current building is known as Bloomberg London and hosts the European headquarters of Bloomberg L.P., which retains the London Mithraeum within for public viewing. During construction, it was moved back to close to its original location.

== See also ==
- 1 Queen Victoria Street

== Bibliography ==
- Bradley, Simon; Pevsner, Nikolaus, eds. (2002). The City of London (1. publ. by Yale Univ. Press ed.). Harmondsworth: Penguin Books. ISBN 978-0-300-09624-8.
- Weinreb, Ben; Hibbert, Christopher, eds. (1995). The London encyclopaedia (Rev. ed.). London: Macmillan.. ISBN 978-0-333-57688-5.
