= List of churches in the Diocese of London =

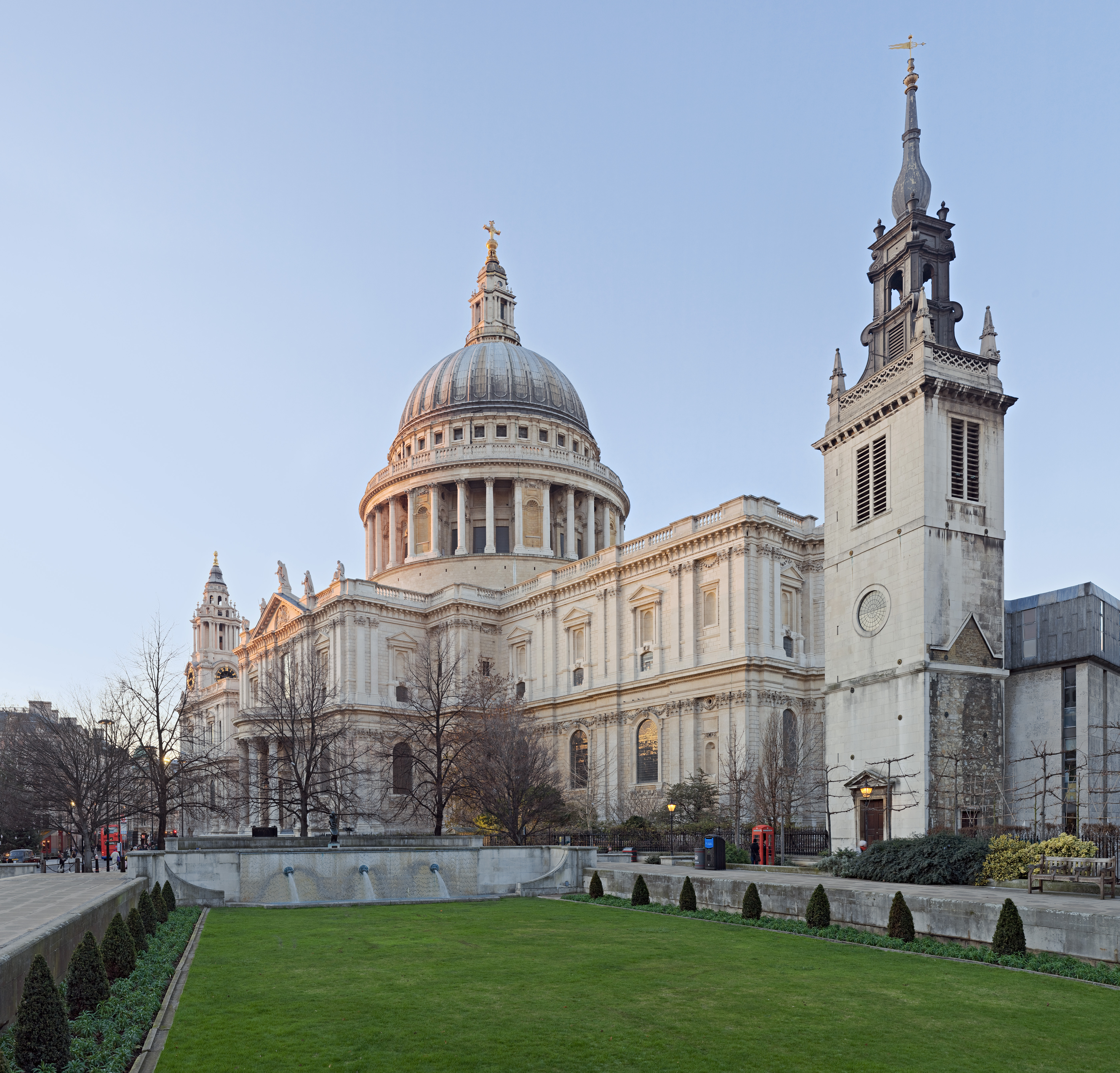
St Paul's Cathedral is the diocesan cathedral of the Diocese of London.

The Anglican Diocese of London forms part of the Province of Canterbury in England. Historically the diocese covered a large area north of the River Thames which included all of Essex and southern and Eastern parts of Hertfordshire, and bordered the dioceses of Norwich and Lincoln to the north and west. The present diocese covers 177 square miles (458 km^{2}), and 17 London boroughs, covering most of Greater London north of the Thames and west of the River Lea. This area corresponds almost exactly to the historic county of Middlesex (except the South Mimms and Potters Bar area), and includes the City of London in which lies its cathedral, St Paul's, as well as encompassing Spelthorne, which is currently administered by Surrey. Essex formed part of the diocese until 1846; it is now part of the Diocese of Chelmsford. The diocese is divided into five episcopal areas, each of which (except the central one) is the particular responsibility of one of the diocese's suffragan bishops. It is further divided into archdeaconries and rural deaneries, as shown below.

In the following tables APC stands for ancient parish church and MC for medieval chapel.

== Archdeaconries and deaneries ==
Episcopal area	Archdeaconry	Deaneries	Churches	Population	People/church
Two Cities (Bishop of London)	London	City of London	36*	10,694	297
Two Cities (Bishop of London)	Charing Cross	Westminster Paddington	13	106,015	8,155
Two Cities (Bishop of London)	Charing Cross	Westminster St Margaret	23**	70,129	3,049
Two Cities (Bishop of London)	Charing Cross	Westminster St Marylebone	10	63,609	6,361
Edmonton (area Bishop of Edmonton)	Hampstead	Central Barnet	13	111,434	8,572
Edmonton (area Bishop of Edmonton)	Hampstead	West Barnet	16	180,398	11,275
Edmonton (area Bishop of Edmonton)	Hampstead	North Camden (Hampstead)	15	110,394	7,360
Edmonton (area Bishop of Edmonton)	Hampstead	South Camden (St Pancras and Holborn)	18	110,087	6,116
Edmonton (area Bishop of Edmonton)	Hampstead	Enfield	27	290,186	10,748
Edmonton (area Bishop of Edmonton)	Hampstead	East Haringey	17	180,034	10,590
Edmonton (area Bishop of Edmonton)	Hampstead	West Haringey	9	83,790	9,310
Kensington (area Bishop of Kensington)	Middlesex	Hammersmith and Fulham	21	180,847	8,612
Kensington (area Bishop of Kensington)	Middlesex	Hampton	15	107,685	7,179
Kensington (area Bishop of Kensington)	Middlesex	Hounslow	27	258,288	9,566
Kensington (area Bishop of Kensington)	Middlesex	Kensington	16	92,214	5,763
Kensington (area Bishop of Kensington)	Middlesex	Chelsea	14	68,748	4,911
Kensington (area Bishop of Kensington)	Middlesex	Spelthorne	11	95,968	8,724
Stepney (area Bishop of Stepney)	Hackney	Hackney	29	257,584	8,882
Stepney (area Bishop of Stepney)	Hackney	Islington	27	201,935	7,479
Stepney (area Bishop of Stepney)	Hackney	Tower Hamlets	21	252,209	12,010
Willesden (area Bishop of Willesden)	Northolt	Brent	22	287,900	13,086
Willesden (area Bishop of Willesden)	Northolt	Ealing	37	341,529	9,231
Willesden (area Bishop of Willesden)	Northolt	Harrow	23	273,671	11,899
Willesden (area Bishop of Willesden)	Northolt	Hillingdon	21	253,119	12,053
Total/average			481	3,988,467	8,292

*including the Cathedral and Temple

**including the Abbey and its Church

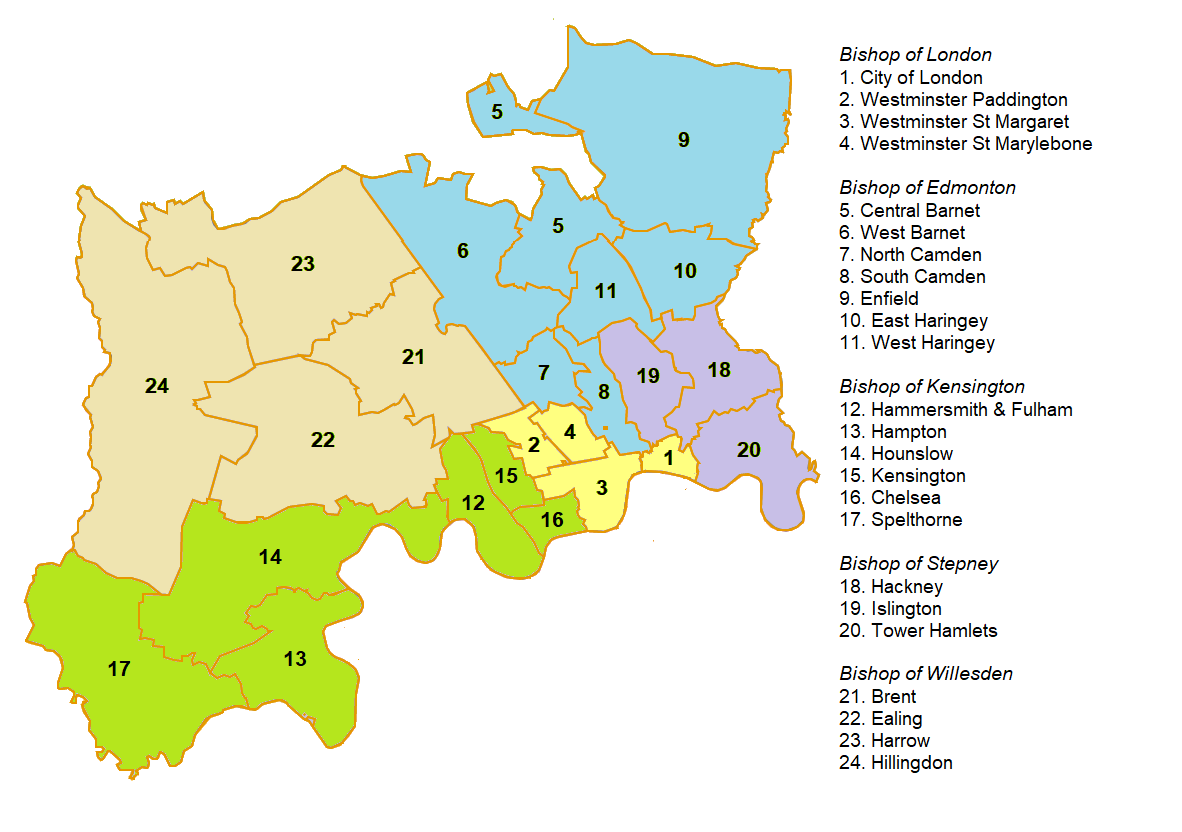

== Archdeaconry of London ==
=== Not in a deanery ===
Benefice	Churches	Founded (building)	Pop. served
Cathedra	St Paul's Cathedral	Ancient (1710)	N/A
Temple Church	Temple Church	1185	120
Westminster Abbey (Royal Peculiar)	Westminster Abbey (Collegiate Church of St Peter)	Ancient	258
St Margaret's Westminster (Royal Peculiar)	St Margaret, Westminster	APC (1523)	258

=== Deanery of the City of London ===
See also List of churches in the City of London.

Benefice	Church	Founded (building)	Pop. served
London City All Hallows Berkynchirche-By-The-Tower with St; Dunstan-In-The-East	All Hallows-by-the-Tower	APC (Medieval)	60
London City Great St Bartholomew, Smithfield	St Bartholomew-the-Great, West Smithfield	APC	464
London City Great St Bartholomew, Smithfield	St Bartholomew-the-Less, Smithfield Gate	APC	464
London City St Andrew-By-The-Wardrobe with St Ann, Blackfriars and St Martin Ludgate	St Andrew-by-the-Wardrobe	APC (1695)	179
London City St Andrew-By-The-Wardrobe with St Ann, Blackfriars and St Martin Ludgate	St Nicholas Cole Abbey	APC/2016 (1678)	179
London City St Andrew-By-The-Wardrobe with St Ann, Blackfriars and St Martin Ludgate	St Martin within Ludgate	APC (1684)	179
London City St Botolph Without Bishopgate	St Botolph-without-Bishopsgate	APC (1729)	145
London City St Botolph Aldgate with Holy Trinity Minories	St Botolph, Aldgate	APC (1744)	560
London City St Bride Fleet Street with Bridewell and Trinity Gough; Square	St Bride, Fleet Street	APC (c. 1950)	466
London City St Margaret Lothbury and St Stephen Coleman Street with St Christopher-Le-Stocks, St Bartholomew-By-The-Exchange, St Olave Old Jewry, St Martin Pomeroy, St Mildred Poultry and St; Mary Colechurch	St Margaret Lothbury	APC (1690)	16
London City St Edmund the King and St Mary Woolnoth with St; Nicholas Acons, All Hallows Lombard Street, St Benet Gracechurch, St Leonard Eastcheap, St Dionis Backchurch and St Mary; Woolchurch Haw and St Clement Eastcheap with St Martin Orgar	St Mary Woolnoth	APC (1727)	23
London City St Giles Cripplegate with St Bartholomew Moor Lane and St Alphage London Wall and St Luke Old Street with St Mary; Charterhouse and St Paul Clerkenwell	St Giles-without-Cripplegate	APC (Medieval)	7,557
London City St Helen, Bishopsgate with St Andrew Undershaft and St Ethelburga, Bishopsgate and St Martin Outwich and St Mary Axe	St Helen, Bishopsgate	APC	57
London City St Peter Cornhill	St Helen, Bishopsgate	APC	57
London City St Michael Cornhill with St Peter Le Poer and St Benet; Fink	St Michael, Cornhill	APC (1672)	57
London City St James Garlickhythe with St Michael Queenhithe and Holy Trinity-The-Less	St James Garlickhythe	APC (1717)	296
London Guild Church St Michael Paternoster Royal	St Michael Paternoster Royal	Medieval (1694)	296
London City St Magnus the Martyr with St Margaret New Fish Street and St Michael Crooked Lane	St Magnus-the-Martyr	APC (1687)	7
London City St Mary at Hill with St Andrew Hubbard, St George; Botolph Lane and St Botolph By Billingsgate	St Mary-at-Hill, Eastcheap	APC (C17th)	63
London City St Mary Le Bow with St Pancras Soper Lane, All; Hallows Honey Lane, All Hallows Bread Street, St John the Evangelist Watling Street, St Augustine with St Faith Under St; Paul's and St Mildred Bread Street with St Margaret Moyses	St Mary-le-Bow, Cheapside	APC (1673)	60
London City St Olave Hart Street with All Hallows Staining and St; Catherine Coleman	St Olave Hart Street	APC	66
London Guild Church St Katharine Cree	St Katharine Cree	APC (1630)	66
London City St Sepulchre with Christ Church Greyfriars and St; Leonard Foster Lane	St Sepulchre-without-Newgate	APC (C17th)	521
London City St Stephen Walbrook and St Swithun London Stone with St Benet Sherehog and St Mary Bothaw with St Laurence; Pountney	St Stephen, Walbrook	APC (1679)	12
London City St Vedast with St Michael-Le-Querne, St Matthew; Friday Street, St Peter Cheap, St Alban Wood Street, St Olave; Silver Street, St Michael Wood Street, St Mary Staining, St Anne and St Agnes and St John Zachary Gresham Street	St Vedast Foster Lane	APC (1701)	22
London Guild Church St Mary Aldermary	St Mary Aldermary	APC (1681)	22
London Guild Church All Hallows London Wall	All Hallows-on-the-Wall	APC (1767)	N/A
London Guild Church St Andrew Holborn	St Andrew, Holborn	APC (C17th)	N/A
London Guild Church St Benet Paul's Wharf	St Benet, Paul's Wharf	APC (1683)	N/A
London Guild Church St Botolph Without Aldersgate	St Botolph's Aldersgate	APC (1791)	N/A
London Guild Church St Dunstan in the West	St Dunstan-in-the-West	APC (1833)	N/A
London Guild Church St Lawrence Jewry	St Lawrence Jewry	APC (1687)	N/A
London Guild Church St Margaret Pattens	St Margaret Pattens	APC (1687)	N/A
London Guild Church St Mary Abchurch	St Mary Abchurch	APC (1686)	N/A

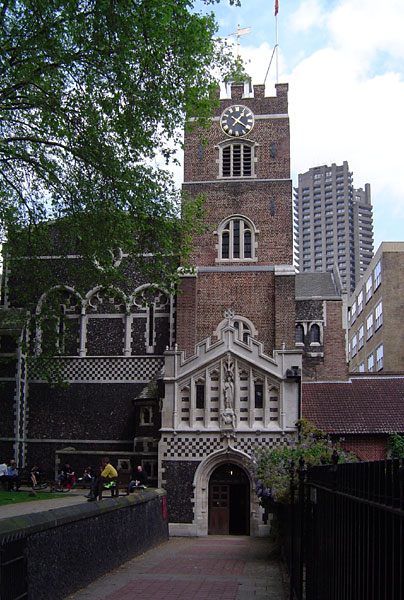
The former priory church of St Bartholomew-the-Great.

=== Deanery of Westminster Paddington ===
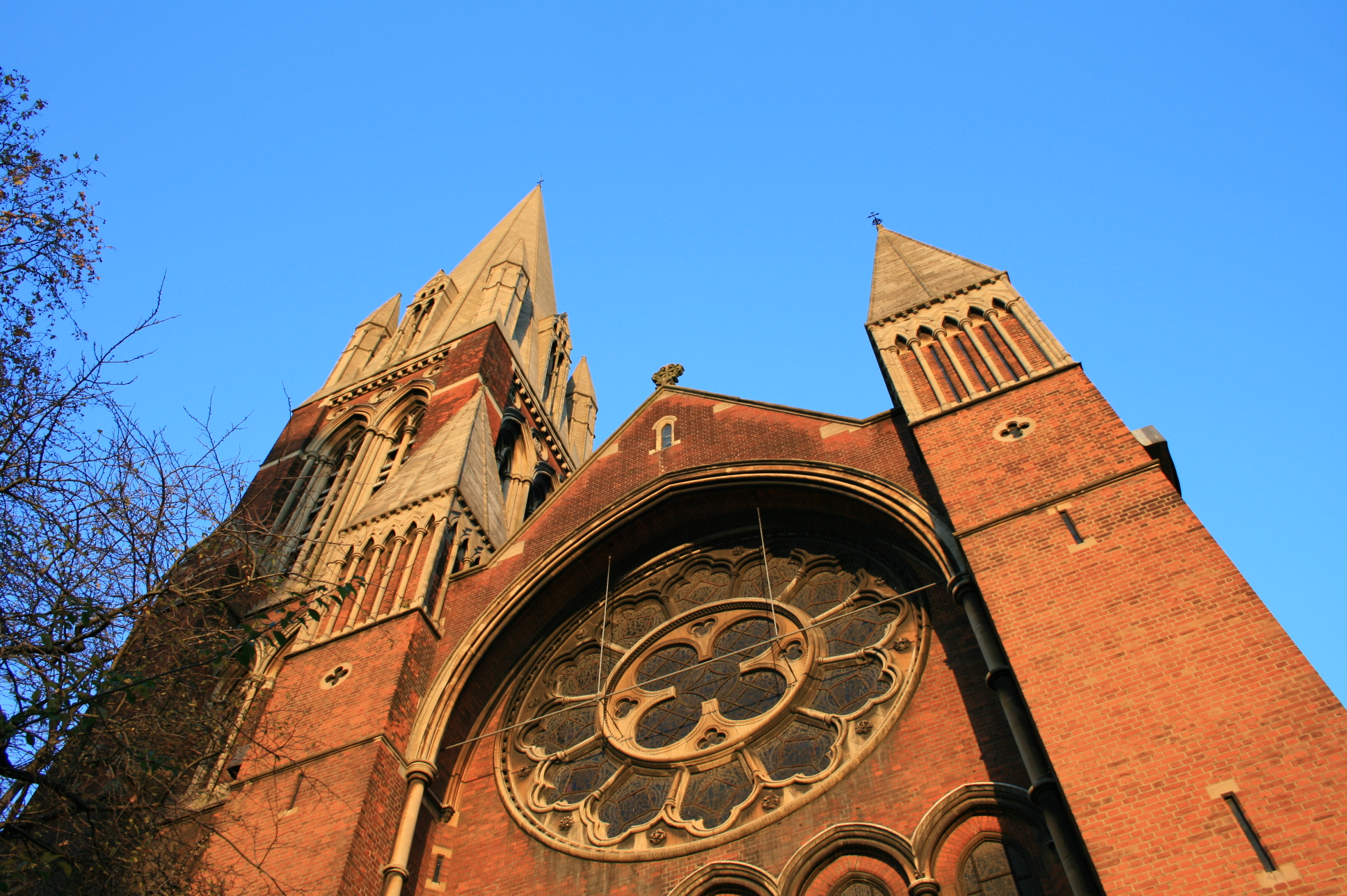
The church of St Augustine's, Kilburn

Benefice	Church	Founded (building)	Pop. served
Bayswater	St Matthew, Bayswater^{1}	1818 (1882)	4,891
Kensal Green	St John the Evangelist, Kensal Green	1844	8,574
Kilburn	St Augustine, Kilburn	1870 (1880)	8,923
West Kilburn and Harrow Road	St Luke the Evangelist, West Kilburn	1876	19,403
West Kilburn and Harrow Road	Emmanuel Harrow Road, Paddington	1886 (1995)	19,403
Little Venice	St Mary on Paddington Green	APC (1678) 1791)	17,815
Little Venice	St Saviour, Warwick Avenue	1855 (1976)	17,815
Paddington (St James)	St James Sussex Gardens, Paddington	1843 (1882)	13,800
Paddington (St John the Evangelist) (St Michael and All Angels)	St John the Evangelist, Hyde Park Crescent	1831	6,895
Paddington (St Mary Magdalene) (St Peter)	St Mary Magdalene, Paddington	1865 (1867)	12,962
Paddington (St Mary Magdalene) (St Peter)	St Peter Elgin Avenue, Paddington	1871 (1975)	12,962
Paddington (St Stephen with St Luke)	St Stephen, Westbourne Park	1856	12,752

^{1}known as the Orme Chapel until 1858

=== Deanery of Westminster St Margaret ===
Benefice	Churches	Founded (building)	Pop. served
Chester Square	St Michael Chester Square, Westminster	1846	1,612
Covent Garden	St Paul, Covent Garden	1631	2,531
Grosvenor Chapel	Grosvenor Chapel	1730	5,086
Hanover Square	St George, Hanover Square	1725	5,086
South Kensington	Holy Trinity, South Kensington	1901	4,501
Down Street Mayfair	Christ Church, Mayfair	2001 (1865)	N/A
Pimlico (St Barnabas)	St Barnabas, Pimlico	1847	3,296
Pimlico (St Gabriel)	St Gabriel Warwick Square, Pimlico	1851	13,845
Pimlico (St Mary) Bourne Street	St Mary Bourne Street, Pimlico	1874	810
Pimlico (St Peter) with Westminster Christ Church	St Peter Eaton Square, Pimlico	1827 (1837)	4,085
Pimlico (St Saviour)	St Saviour, Pimlico	1863	5,747
Soho	St Anne, Soho	1677 (1991)	3,333
St Giles-In-The-Fields	St Giles-in-the-Fields	APC (1734)	4,399
St Martin-In-The-Fields	St Martin-in-the-Fields	APC (1726)	1,789
Westminster (St James the Less)	St James the Less, Pimlico	1858	2,525
Westminster (St James) Piccadilly	St James, Piccadilly	1684	729
Westminster (St Matthew)	St Matthew, Westminster	1849 (1984)	3,132
St Mary Le Strand with St Clement Danes	St Mary le Strand	APC (1723)	3,132
St Mary Le Strand with St Clement Danes	St Clement Danes	APC (1682)	3,132
Westminster (St Stephen) with St John	St Stephen Rochester Row, Westminster	1850	11,021
Wilton Place	St Paul Wilton Place, Knightsbridge	1841	1,430

=== Deanery of Westminster St Marylebone ===
Benefice	Churches	Founded (building)	Pop. served
Bryanston Square with St Marylebone (St Mark)	St Mary, Bryanston Square	1823	8,272
Langham Place	All Souls, Langham Place	1824	8,028
St John's Wood	St John the Baptist, St John's Wood	1814	8,533
St Marylebone (All Saints)	All Saints Margaret Street, Marylebone	1850	244
St Marylebone (Annunciation) Bryanston Street	Annunciation, Marble Arch^{1}	1787 (1912)	5,705
St Marylebone (St Cyprian)	St Cyprian, Clarence Gate	1866 (1903)	5,705
St Marylebone (St Mark) Hamilton Terrace	St Mark Hamilton Terrace, St John's Wood	1847	10,878
St Marylebone (St Marylebone) (Holy Trinity)	(New) St Marylebone Parish Church	1817	7,837
St Marylebone (St Paul)	St Paul Rossmore Road, Marylebone	1838	14,112

^{1}known as the Quebec Chapel until 1912

== Archdeaconry of Hampstead ==
=== Deanery of Central Barnet ===
Benefice	Churches	Founded (building)	Pop. served
Finchley (Christ Church)	Christ Church, North Finchley	1864	12,752
Finchley (St Mary)	St Mary-at-Finchley	APC	10,916
Finchley (St Paul) (St Luke)	St Paul Long Lane, Finchley	1885	16,043
East Finchley	All Saints, East Finchley	1891	4,599
Friern Barnet (All Saints)	All Saints, Oakleigh Park	1883	14,448
Whetstone	St John the Apostle, Whetstone	1832	14,448
Friern Barnet (St James the Great) (St John the Evangelist)	St John the Evangelist, Friern Barnet	1883 (1891)	15,811
Friern Barnet (St Peter Le Poer)	St Peter, Muswell Hill	1866 (1910)	5,868
South Mimms (Christ Church)	Christ Church, Barnet	1845	4,750
Monken Hadley	St Mary the Virgin, Monken Hadley	APC	4,789
New Southgate	St Paul, New Southgate	1870 (1873)	12,509
Woodside Park	St Barnabas, Woodside Park	1885 (1912)	8,949

=== Deanery of West Barnet ===
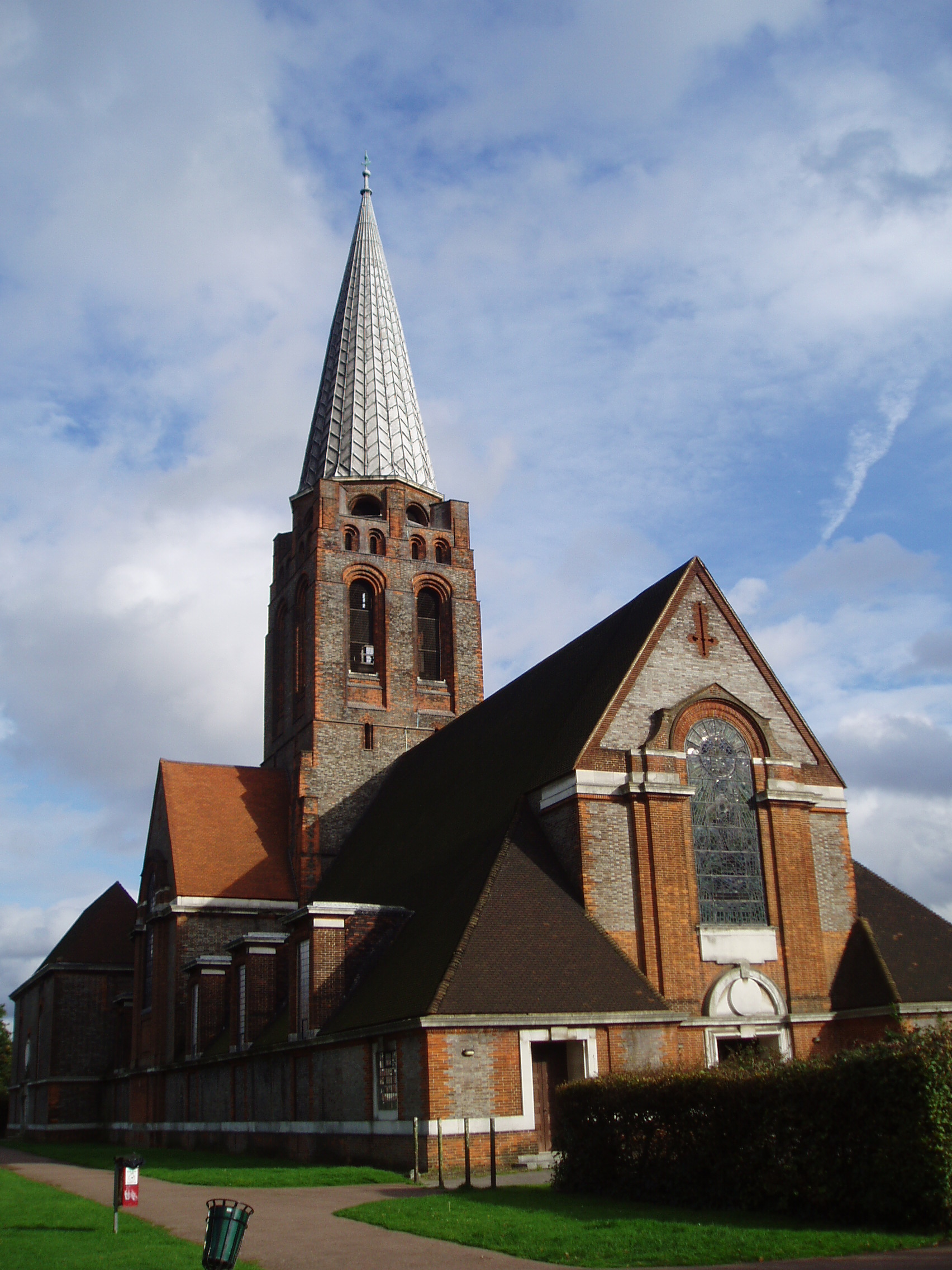
St Jude's Church, Hampstead Garden Suburb

Benefice	Churches	Founded (building)	Pop. served
Colindale	St Matthias, Colindale	1905 (1934) (1972)	6,248
Edgware	St Margaret of Antioch, Edgware	MC	20,109
Edgware	St Andrew, Broadfields	1937	20,109
Edgware	St Peter, Stonegrove	1962	20,109
Golders Green	St Alban the Martyr, Golders Green	1910 (1933)	22,632
Hampstead Garden Suburb	St Jude on the Hill, Hampstead Garden Suburb	1908 (1911)	11,855
Hendon (All Saints) Childs Hill	All Saints, Childs Hill	1856	7,384
Hendon (St Alphage)	St Alphage, Burnt Oak^{2}	1904 (1927)	30,026
Grahame Park (St Augustine) Conventional District	St Augustine, Grahame Park	1975	30,026
Hendon (St Mary) (Christ Church)	St Mary, Hendon	APC	28,057
Hendon (St Mary) (Christ Church)	Christ Church, Hendon	1881	28,057
Hendon (St Paul) Mill Hill	St Paul, Mill Hill	1833	8,655
West Hendon and Cricklewood	St John, Hendon West	1866 (1896)	26,972
West Hendon and Cricklewood	St Peter, Cricklewood^{1}	1882	26,972
Mill Hill (John Keble Church)	John Keble Church, Mill Hill	1932 (1936)	10,240
Mill Hill (St Michael and All Angels)	St Michael & All Angels, Mill Hill	1909 (1922)	8,220

^{1}est. 1882. Permanent building 1891, rebuilt 1972. Closed 2004, but church meets occasionally in schools and homes. ^{2}1904 dedication to St Paul

=== Deanery of North Camden (Hampstead) ===
Benefice	Churches	Founded (building)	Pop. served
Belsize Park (St Peter)	St Peter, Belsize Park	1859	15,283
Hampstead, South (St Saviour)	St Saviour, Hampstead	1847 (1856)	15,283
Finchley (Holy Trinity)	Holy Trinity, East Finchley	1846	11,880
Hampstead (Christ Church)^{1}	Christ Church, Hampstead	1725 (1850)	3,351
Hampstead (Emmanuel) West End	Emmanuel, West Hampstead	1846 (1875)	19,535
Hampstead, West (St Cuthbert)	St Cuthbert, West Hampstead	1870s (1886)	19,535
Hampstead (St John)	St John the Evangelist, Hampstead	MC (1747)	9,258
Hampstead (St Stephen with All Hallows)	All Hallows, Gospel Oak	1883	11,026
Hampstead (St John) Downshire Hill Proprietary Chapel	St John, Downshire Hill	1823	11,026
Hampstead, West (Holy Trinity)	Holy Trinity, Finchley Road (The Lighthouse)	1871 (1978)	4,998
Hampstead, West (St Luke)	St Luke, Hampstead	1896 (1899)	4,066
Kilburn Priory Road (St Mary) with All Souls and with Hampstead St James	St Mary, Kilburn	1857	19,762
Kilburn Priory Road (St Mary) with All Souls and with Hampstead St James	St James, West Hampstead	1882 (1888)	19,762
Primrose Hill (St Mary the Virgin) with Avenue Road (St Paul)	St Mary the Virgin, Primrose Hill	1867 (1872)	7,341
Regent's Park (St Mark)	St Mark, Regents Park	1853	3,894

^{1}known as Hampstead or Well Walk Chapel until 1850

=== Deanery of South Camden (St Pancras and Holborn) ===
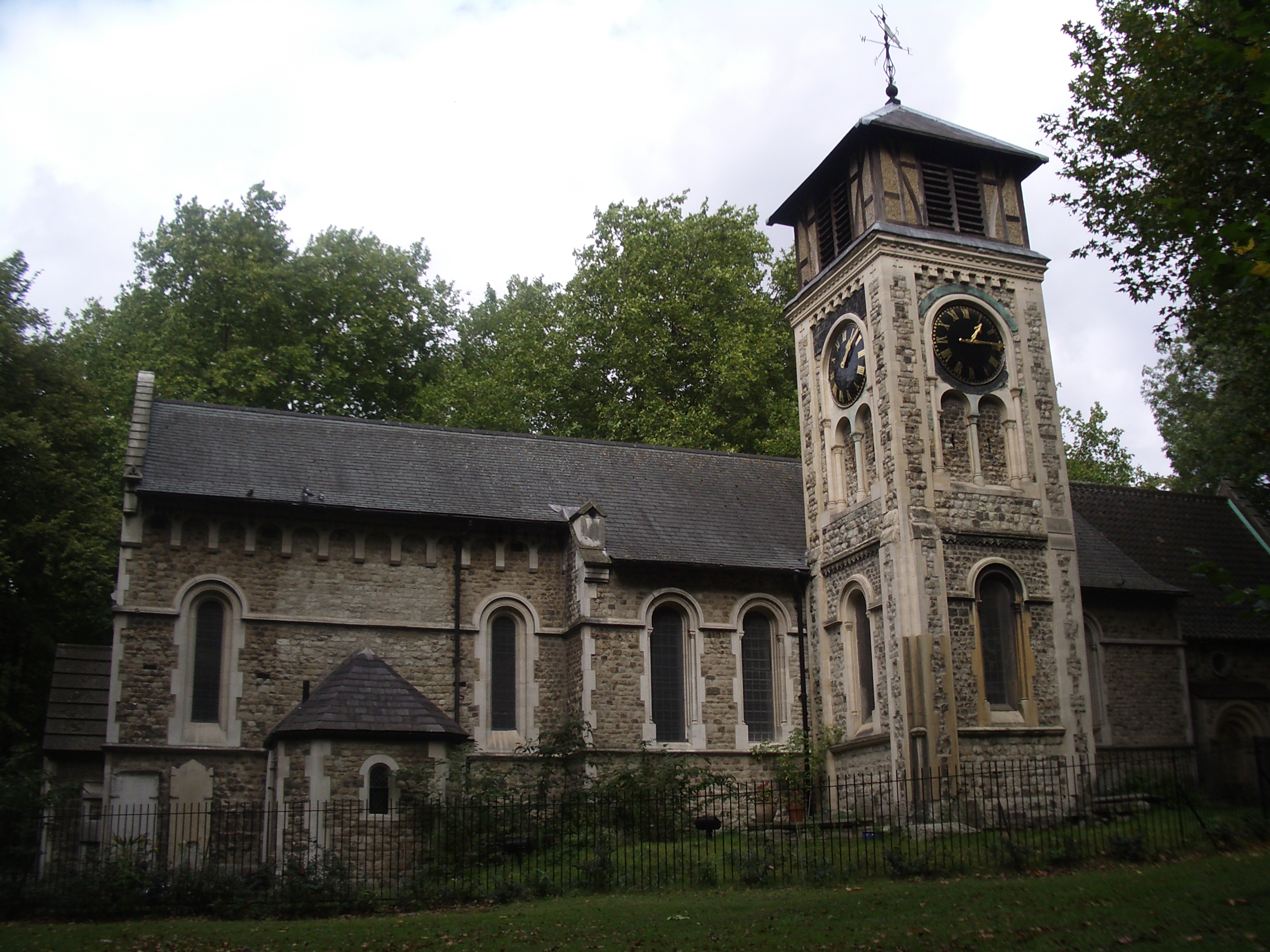
St Pancras Old Church is thought to be one of the oldest sites of Christian worship in England.

Benefice	Churches	Founded (building)	Pop. served
Bloomsbury (St George) with Woburn Square (Christ Church)	St George, Bloomsbury	1731	2,604
Brookfield (St Anne), Highgate Rise	St Anne, Highgate	1853	5,027
Brookfield (St Mary)	St Mary, Brookfield	1875	4,231
Holborn (St Alban the Martyr) with Saffron Hill St Peter	St Alban the Martyr, Holborn	1861	3,158
Holborn (St George the Martyr) Queen Square (Holy Trinity) (St Bartholomew) Grays Inn Road	St George the Martyr, Holborn	1703	11,058
Kentish Town (St Benet and All Saints)	St Benet & All Saints, Kentish Town	1881	10,273
Kentish Town (St Martin) (St Andrew)	St Martin, Gospel Oak	1865	5,102
Kentish Town (St Silas) and (Holy Trinity) with St Barnabas	St Silas the Martyr, Kentish Town	1877	13,755
Kentish Town (St Silas) and (Holy Trinity) with St Barnabas	Holy Trinity, Kentish Town	1850	13,755
Munster Square (Christ Church) (St Mary Magdalene)	St Mary Magdalene Munster Square, Regent's Park	1852	9,107
Oseney Crescent (St Luke)	St Luke, Kentish Town	1856	3,992
St Pancras (Holy Cross) (St Jude) (St Peter)	Holy Cross Cromer Street, St Pancras	1888	6,098
St Pancras (Old Church)	St Pancras Old Church	APC	28,630
St Pancras (Old Church)	St Michael, Camden Town	1877 (1881)	28,630
St Pancras (Old Church)	St Mary the Virgin, Somers Town	1824	28,630
St Pancras (Old Church)	St Paul Camden Square, Camden Town	1849 (c. 1950)	28,630
St Pancras (St Pancras) (St James) (Christ Church)	St Pancras New Church	1819	7,052
Euston	Euston Church	2010	

=== Deanery of Enfield ===
Benefice	Church	Founded (building)	Pop. served
Bush Hill Park (St Mark)	St Mark, Bush Hill Park	1885 (1893)	7,472
Bush Hill Park (St Stephen)	St Stephen, Bush Hill Park	1901 (1907)	8,645
Clay Hill	St John the Baptist, Clay Hill	1858	7,616
Clay Hill	St Luke, Clay Hill	1885 (1899)	7,616
Edmonton (All Saints) (St Michael)	All Saints, Edmonton	APC	25,799
Edmonton (St Aldhelm)	St Aldhelm, Edmonton	1885 (1903)	15,557
Edmonton (St Alphege)	St Alphege, Edmonton	1897 (1958)	12,091
Ponders End	St Matthew, Ponders End	1878	11,458
Edmonton (St Mary with St John) (St Mary's Centre)	St John the Evangelist, Upper Edmonton	c. 1884 (1905)	14,279
Edmonton (St Peter with St Martin)	St Peter, Lower Edmonton	1896–1900	13,736
Enfield (Christ Church) Trent Park	Christ Church, Cockfosters	1839	5,483
Hadley Wood Proprietary Chapel	St Paul, Hadley Wood	1900 (1911)	5,483
Enfield (St Andrew)	St Andrew, Enfield	APC	20,255
Enfield (St George)	St George, Freezywater	1896 (1906)	12,946
Enfield (St James) (St Barnabas)	St James, Enfield Highway	1831	26,896
Enfield (St Michael and All Angels)	St Michael & All Angels, Gordon Hill	1874	6,058
Enfield (St Peter and St Paul)	SS Peter & Paul, Enfield Lock	1928 (1969)	11,179
Enfield Chase	St Mary Magdalene, Enfield	1883	5,928
Forty Hill	Jesus Church, Forty Hill	1835	14,330
Grange Park	St Peter, Grange Park	1920s (1941)	7,509
N/A	Grace Church Highlands	2007	7,509
Oakwood	St Thomas, Oakwood	c. 1906 (1939)	8,103
Palmers Green	St John the Evangelist, Palmers Green	1904	12,782
Southgate (Christ Church)	Christ Church, Southgate^{1}	1615 (1862)	12,132
Southgate (St Andrew)	St Andrew, Southgate	1875 (1905)	12,700
Winchmore Hill (Holy Trinity)	Holy Trinity, Winchmore Hill	1903 (1907)	9,076
Winchmore Hill (St Paul)	St Paul, Winchmore Hill	1828	8,156

^{1}known as the Weld Chapel until 1862

=== Deanery of East Haringey ===
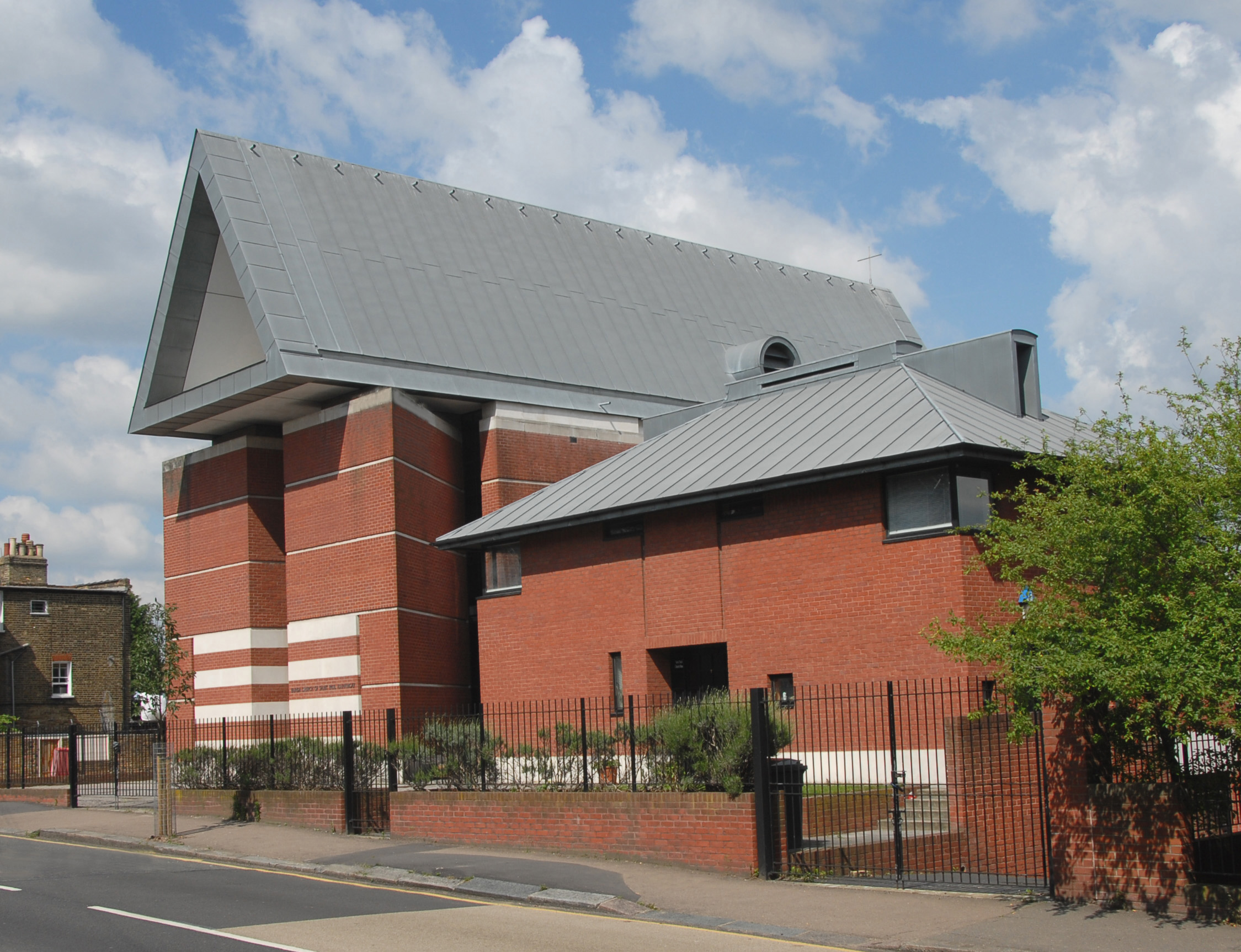
St Paul's, Harringay replaced a 19th-century church building, destroyed by fire, in 1993.

Benefice	Churches	Founded (building)	Pop. served
Chitts Hill (St Cuthbert)	St Cuthbert Chitts Hill, Wood Green	1907	9,887
Great Cambridge Road (St John the Baptist and St James)	St John the Baptist, Great Cambridge Road^{1}	1926 (1939)	14,985
Tottenham (St Paul)	St Paul, Tottenham	1855 (1976)	10,881
Harringay (St Paul)	St Paul, South Harringay	1883 (1891)	11,680
Noel Park (St Mark)	St Mark, Noel Park	1884 (1889)	8,992
Tottenham (All Hallows)	All Hallows, Tottenham	APC	10,617
Tottenham (Holy Trinity)	Holy Trinity, Tottenham	1829	17,569
Tottenham (Holy Trinity)	St Francis at the Engine Room, Tottenham Hale	2013 (2017)	17,569
Tottenham (St Benet Fink)	St Benet Fink, Tottenham	1905 (1911)	9,527
Tottenham (St Philip the Apostle)	St Philip the Apostle, Tottenham	1899 (1906)	10,234
Tottenham (St Mary the Virgin)	St Mary the Virgin, Tottenham	1884	10,330
Tottenham (St Mary the Virgin)	Good Shepherd, Tottenham	1890s	10,330
Tottenham, South (St Ann)	St Ann, South Tottenham	1860	19,258
West Green (Christ Church with St Peter)	Christ Church, West Green	1882 (1888)	14,983
Wood Green (St Michael) with Bounds Green (St Gabriel) (St Michael-At-Bowes)	St Michael & All Angels, Wood Green	1843	31,091
Wood Green (St Michael) with Bounds Green (St Gabriel) (St Michael-At-Bowes)	St Michael-at-Bowes, Bowes Park	1874 (1988)	31,091

^{1}1926 dedication to St Hilda

=== Deanery of West Haringey ===
Benefice	Churches	Founded (building)	Pop. served
Alexandra Park (St Andrew)	St Andrew, Alexandra Park	1900 (1957)	12,502
Highgate (All Saints)	All Saints, Highgate	1864	5,389
Highgate (St Augustine)	St Augustine of Canterbury, Highgate	1873 (1896)	5,377
Highgate (St Michael)	St Michael, Highgate	MC (1832)	4,641
Hornsey (Christ Church)	Christ Church, Crouch End	1862	7,606
Hornsey (Holy Innocents)	Holy Innocents, Hornsey	1875	5,569
Hornsey (St Mary) (St George)	(St Mary with) St George, Hornsey	1907 (1959)	13,552
Muswell Hill (St James) (St Matthew)	St James, Muswell Hill	1842 (1902)	15,322
Stroud Green (Holy Trinity)	Holy Trinity, Stroud Green	1881 (1960s)	13,832

== Archdeaconry of Middlesex ==
=== Deanery of Hammersmith and Fulham ===
Benefice	Churches	Founded (building)	Population served
Cobbold Road (St Saviour) with St Mary	St Saviour Wendell Park, Hammersmith	c. 1880 (1889)	12,251
Fulham (All Saints)	All Saints, Fulham	APC	18,884
Fulham (St Etheldreda) (St Clement)	St Etheldreda, Fulham	c. 1897	18,884
Fulham (St Etheldreda) (St Clement)	St Clement, Fulham	c. 1886	18,884
Fulham (Christ Church)	Christ Church, Fulham	c. 1903	5,210
Fulham (St Alban) (St Augustine)	St Alban, Fulham	c. 1897	10,099
Fulham (St Andrew) Fulham Fields	St Andrew, Fulham Fields	c. 1874	11,485
Fulham (St Dionis) Parson's Green	St Dionis, Parsons Green	1886	7,147
Fulham (St Mary) North End	St Mary North End, Fulham	c. 1835	7,988
Fulham (St Matthew)	St Matthew, Fulham	c. 1895	8,934
Fulham (St Peter)	St Peter, Fulham	c. 1883	6,677
Hammersmith (Holy Innocents) (St John the Evangelist)	Holy Innocents, Hammersmith	c. 1892	9,869
Hammersmith (St Luke)	St Luke, Shepherd's Bush	1872	10,338
Hammersmith (St Matthew)	St Matthew Sinclair Road, Hammersmith	1872	9,161
Hammersmith (St Paul)	St Paul, Hammersmith	1630 (1891)	7,743
Hammersmith (St Peter)	St Peter, Hammersmith	1829	5,734
Hammersmith (St Simon)	St Simon, Shepherd's Bush	1880	5,306
Hammersmith, North (St Katherine)	St Katherine Westway, N Hammersmith	1922	10,203
Shepherd's Bush (St Michael and St George) (St Stephen) (St Thomas)	St Stephen (& St Thomas), Shepherd's Bush	1850	16,779
Shepherd's Bush (St Michael and St George) (St Stephen) (St Thomas)	St Michael & St George, White City	1953	16,779
Walham Green (St John) (St James)	St John Walham Green, Fulham	1828	17,039

=== Deanery of Hampton ===
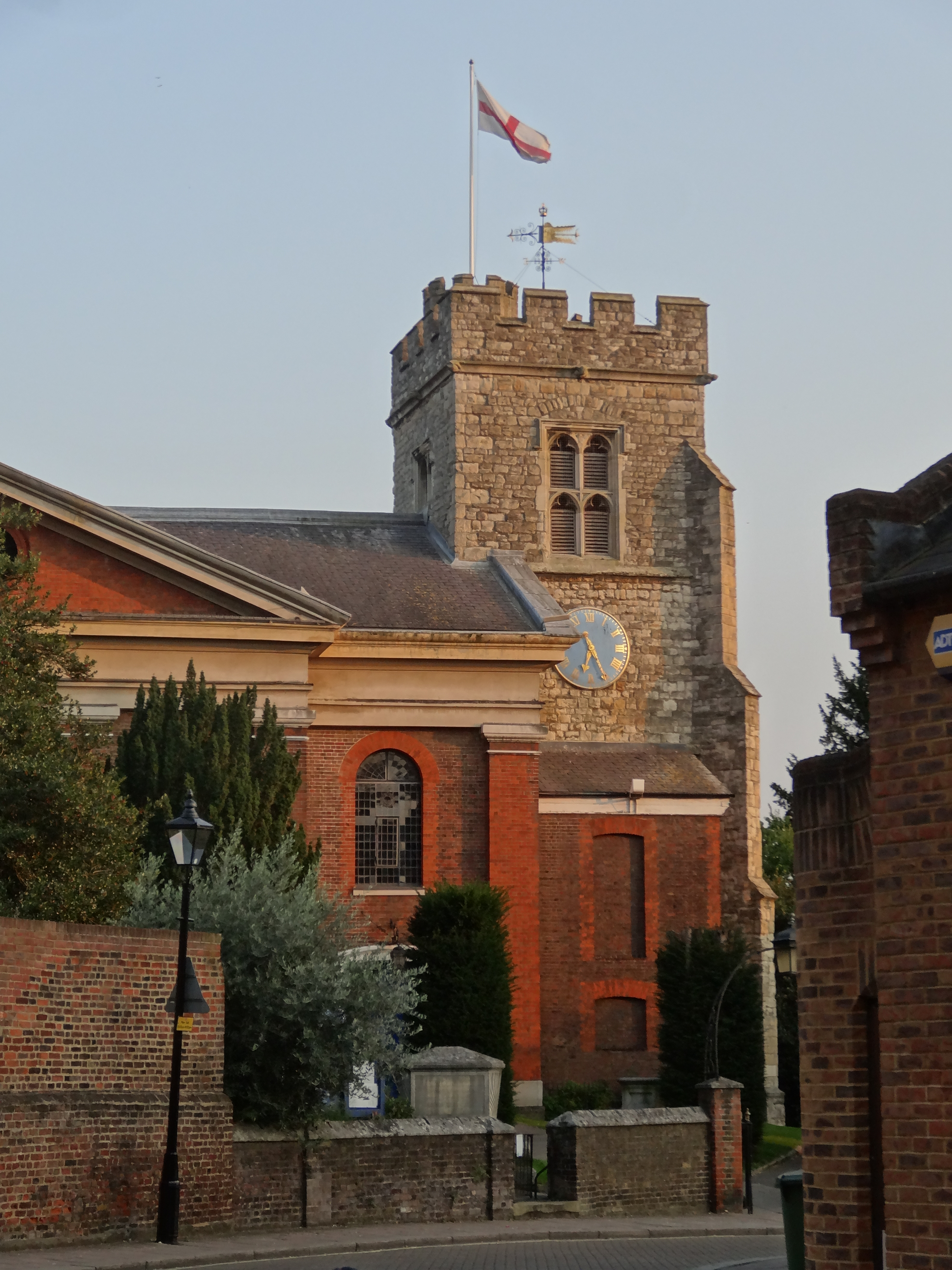
St Mary's, Twickenham

Benefice	Churches	Founded (building)	Population served
Hampton (All Saints)	All Saints, Hampton	1929	9,579
Hampton (St Mary the Virgin)	St Mary, Hampton	APC	5,474
Hampton Hill (St James)	St James, Hampton Hill	1863	8,316
Hampton Wick (St John the Baptist)	St John the Baptist, Hampton Wick	1829	9,238
Teddington (St Mark)^{1}	St Mark, Teddington	1875 (1939)	9,238
Teddington (St Mary) (St Alban the Martyr)	St Mary, Teddington	MC	16,432
Teddington (St Peter and St Paul) and Fulwell St Michael and St George	SS Peter & Paul, Teddington	1865	16,432
Teddington (St Peter and St Paul) and Fulwell St Michael and St George	SS Michael & George, Fulwell	1913	16,432
Twickenham (All Hallows)	All Hallows, Twickenham^{2}	1914 (1940)	4,469
Twickenham (All Saints)	All Saints, Twickenham	1908 (1914)	8,085
Twickenham (St Mary the Virgin)	St Mary, Twickenham	APC (1715)	5,670
Twickenham Common (Holy Trinity)	Holy Trinity, Twickenham	1841	9,577
Twickenham, East (St Stephen) (St Paul)	St Stephen, Twickenham	1874	9,224
Whitton (St Augustine of Canterbury)	St Augustine of Canterbury, Whitton	1935 (1958)	9,056
Whitton (St Philip and St James)	SS Philip & James, Whitton	1862	12,565

^{1}in some sources this church is listed in Hounslow Deanery

^{2}1914 dedication was to St Martin

=== Deanery of Hounslow ===
Benefice	Churches	Founded (building)	Population served
Bedfont, East (St Mary the Virgin)	St Mary, Bedfont	APC	13,843
Bedford Park (St Michael and All Angels)	St Michael & All Angels, Bedford Park	1876 (1879)	6,788
Brentford (St Paul with St Lawrence and St George) (St Faith)	St Paul, Old Brentford	1861 (1868)	22,857
Brentford (St Paul with St Lawrence and St George) (St Faith)	St Faith, Old Brentford	1901 (1907)	22,857
Chiswick (St Michael)	St Michael Elmwood Road, Chiswick	1907 (1909)	6,232
Chiswick (St Nicholas with St Mary Magdalene)	St Nicholas, Chiswick	APC (1884)	10,616
Chiswick (St Paul) Grove Park	St Paul Grove Park, Chiswick	1870 (1872)	4,361
Cranford (Holy Angels) (St Dunstan)	St Dunstan, Cranford	APC	10,492
Cranford (Holy Angels) (St Dunstan)	Holy Angels, Cranford	late C19th (1942) (1970)	10,492
Feltham (St Dunstan)	St Dunstan, Feltham	APC	31,613
Hanworth (All Saints)	All Saints, Hanworth		10,326
Hanworth (St Richard of Chichester)	St Richard of Chichester, Hanworth		5,894
Hanworth (St George)	St George, Hanworth	APC	3,152
Heston (All Saints) (St Leonard)	St Leonard, Heston	APC	22,665
Hounslow (Holy Trinity)	Holy Trinity, Hounslow	C16th (1829)	14,507
Hounslow (St Paul) (Good Shepherd)	Good Shepherd, Hounslow	1957	23,152
Hounslow (St Paul) (Good Shepherd)	St Paul, Hounslow West	1873	23,152
Hounslow (St Stephen)	St Stephen, Hounslow	1872 (1876)	17,841
Isleworth (All Saints)	All Saints, Isleworth	APC	6,060
Isleworth (St Francis of Assisi)	St Francis of Assisi, Isleworth	1935	5,070
Isleworth (St John the Baptist) (St Mary the Virgin)	St John the Baptist, Isleworth	1856	11,792
Isleworth (St John the Baptist) (St Mary the Virgin)	St Mary the Virgin, Isleworth	1931 (1954)	11,792
Spring Grove (St Mary)	St Mary, Osterley	1855	14,736
Spring Grove (St Mary)	St Luke Kingsley Road, Isleworth	c. 1900	14,736
St Margaret's-On-Thames (All Souls)	All Souls, St Margarets	1886 (1897)	9,227
Turnham Green (Christ Church)	Christ Church, Turnham Green	1843	7,064
Turnham Green (Christ Church)	St Alban the Martyr, Acton Green	1882 (1887)	7,064
United Free Church of Feltham (CoE/Meth/URC)	Christ Church, Feltham	2019 (1909)	N/A

=== Deanery of Kensington ===
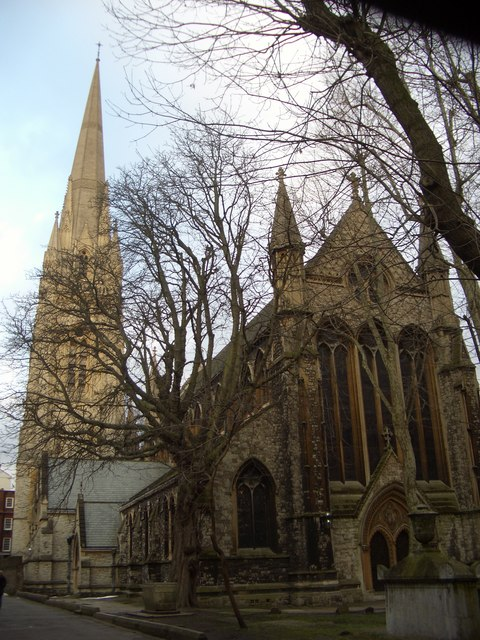
St Mary Abbots

Benefice	Churches	Founded (building)	Population served
Earl's Court Road (St Philip)	St Philip, Earl's Court Road	1858	6,967
Holland Park (St George the Martyr) (St John the Baptist)	St George the Martyr Campden Hill, Holland Park	1864	7,689
Holland Park (St George the Martyr) (St John the Baptist)	St John the Baptist, Holland Park	1872	7,689
Kensal Town (St Thomas) (St Andrew) (St Philip)	St Thomas, Kensal Town	1889 (1967)	3,744
Kensington (Christ Church)	Christ Church, Kensington	1851	7,131
Kensington (St Barnabas)	St Barnabas, Kensington	1829	6,749
Kensington (St Mary Abbots)	St Mary Abbots, Kensington	APC	6,416
Kensington, South (St Stephen)	St Stephen Gloucester Road, South Kensington	1866	2,835
Notting Dale (St Clement) (St Mark) and Norlands St James	St Clement, Notting Dale	1867	12,360
Notting Dale (St Clement) (St Mark) and Norlands St James	St James Norlands, Notting Hill	1845	12,360
Notting Hill (All Saints) (St Columb)	All Saints, Notting Hill	1852–61	7,772
Notting Hill (St John)	St John the Evangelist, Notting Hill	1844	4,461
Notting Hill (St Michael and All Angels) (Christ Church) (St Francis)	St Michael & All Angels, Ladbroke Grove	1870	9,464
Notting Hill (St Michael and All Angels) (Christ Church) (St Francis)	St Francis Dalgarno Way, Notting Hill	1936	10,391
Kensington (St Helen) (Holy Trinity)	St Helen, North Kensington	1884 (1956)	10,391
Notting Hill (St Peter)	St Peter, Notting Hill	1855	6,235

=== cDeanery of Chelsea ===
Benefice	Churches	Founded (building)	Population served
Brompton, West (St Jude) (St Mary) St Peter	St Mary the Boltons, West Brompton	1849	13,976
Chelsea (All Saints) (Old Church)	Chelsea Old Church	APC	4,836
Chelsea (St John with St Andrew) (St John)	St Andrew, Chelsea^{1}	1718 (1810) (1912)	10,881
Chelsea (St John with St Andrew) (St John)	St John World's End, Chelsea	1880 (1976)	10,881
Chelsea (St Luke) (Christ Church)	St Luke, Chelsea	1824	10,908
Chelsea (St Luke) (Christ Church)	Christ Church, Chelsea	1839	10,908
Upper Chelsea (Holy Trinity) (St Saviour)	Holy Trinity Sloane Square, Upper Chelsea	1830 (1890)	6,646
Upper Chelsea (Holy Trinity) (St Saviour)	St Saviour, Upper Chelsea	1840	6,646
Upper Chelsea (St Simon Zelotes)	St Simon Zelotes, Upper Chelsea	1859	1,997
Earl's Court (St Cuthbert) (St Matthias)	St Cuthbert, Earl's Court	1884	7,410
South Kensington (St Luke)	St Luke Redcliffe Gardens, South Kensington	1873	4,235
Onslow Square (Holy Trinity) (St Paul) and South Kensington St Augustine	Holy Trinity, Brompton	1829	7,859
Onslow Square (Holy Trinity) (St Paul) and South Kensington St Augustine	St Paul Onslow Square, Brompton	1860	7,859
Onslow Square (Holy Trinity) (St Paul) and South Kensington St Augustine	St Augustine Queen's Gate, Brompton	1868	7,859

^{1}known as Park Chapel until 1912

=== Deanery of Spelthorne ===
Benefice	Churches	Founded (building)	Population served
Ashford (St Hilda)	St Hilda, Ashford	1912	8,546
Ashford (St Matthew)	St Matthew, Ashford	1856	26,038
Stanwell (St Mary the Virgin)	St Mary the Virgin, Stanwell	APC	26,038
Laleham (All Saints)	All Saints, Laleham	MC	4,080
Shepperton (St Nicholas) and Littleton	St Nicholas, Shepperton	APC (c. 1590)	12,144
Shepperton (St Nicholas) and Littleton	St Mary Magdalene, Littleton	APC	12,144
Staines (Christ Church)	Christ Church, Staines	1935	18,430
Staines (St Mary) (St Peter)	St Mary, Staines	APC (1829)	18,430
Staines (St Mary) (St Peter)	St Peter, Staines	1873 (1894)	18,430
Sunbury, Upper (St Saviour)	St Saviour, Upper Sunbury	1872 (1913)	14,823
Sunbury-On-Thames (St Mary)	St Mary, Sunbury-on-Thames	APC (1752)	11,907

== Archdeaconry of Hackney ==
=== Deanery of Hackney ===
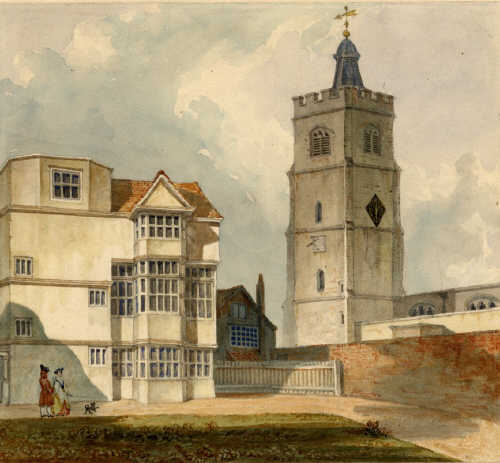
A 1750 print of the former parish church of Hackney. The tower remains, in St John's Church gardens.

Benefice	Churches	Founded (building)	Population served
Brownswood Park (St John the Evangelist)	St John the Evangelist, Brownswood Park	1874	9,407
Clapton (St James)	St James the Great, Lower Clapton	1841	12,889
Clapton, Upper (St Matthew)	St Matthew, Upper Clapton	1862 (1869) (1977)	26,681
Stamford Hill (St Thomas)	St Thomas, Clapton Common^{4}	c. 1774	26,681
Dalston (Holy Trinity) with St Philip and Haggerston All Saints	Holy Trinity, Dalston	1879	8,749
Dalston (Holy Trinity) with St Philip and Haggerston All Saints	All Saints, Haggerston	1856	8,749
Dalston (St Mark with St Bartholomew)	St Mark, Dalston	1860 (1870)	13,822
De Beauvoir Town (St Peter)	St Peter, De Beauvoir Town	1841	8,485
Hackney Marsh (All Souls)	St Barnabas, Homerton	1847	16,959
Hackney Marsh (All Souls)	Risen Christ & All Souls, Clapton Park^{3}	1882 (1977)	16,959
Hackney Wick (St Mary of Eton)	St Mary of Eton, Hackney	1880 (1892)	7,491
Hackney, South (St John of Jerusalem) with Christ Church	St John of Jerusalem, South Hackney	1847	14,468
Hackney, South (St Michael and All Angels) London Fields with Haggerston St Paul	St Michael & All Angels, London Fields	1864	12,326
Hackney, West (St Paul)	St Paul, West Hackney^{5}	1824 (1960)	8,446
Hackney, West (St Paul)	St Barnabas Shacklewell, Dalston	1890 (1910)	8,446
Haggerston (St Chad)	St Chad, Haggerston	1869	6,262
St John-At-Hackney	St John-at-Hackney^{1}	APC (1792)	18,310
Homerton (St Luke)	St Luke, Hackney	1872	18,310
Hoxton (Holy Trinity) (St Mary)	Holy Trinity, Hoxton	1848	7,400
Hoxton (St Anne) (St Columba)	St Anne, Hoxton	1870	5,588
Hoxton (St Anne) (St Columba)	Grace Church Hackney^{2}	c. 2007	5,588
Hoxton (St John the Baptist) with Ch Ch	St John the Baptist, Hoxton	1826	7,665
Shoreditch (St Leonard) with St Michael	St Leonard, Shoreditch	APC (1740)	7,484
Stamford Hill (St Bartholomew)	St Bartholomew, Stamford Hill	1904	9,666
Stoke Newington (St Andrew)	St Andrew, Stoke Newington	1876 (1884)	13,073
Stoke Newington (St Mary) (Old Parish Church)	(New) St Mary, Stoke Newington	1858	13,634
Stoke Newington (St Olave)	St Olave, Woodberry Down	1894	6,675
Stoke Newington Common (St Michael and All Angels)	St Michael & All Angels, Stoke Newington Common	1882 (1885)	12,073
Stoke Newington St Faith (St Matthias) and All Saints	St Matthias, Stoke Newington	1853	10,031

^{1}dedicated to St Augustine of Hippo until 1660 ^{2}uses St Anne's building ^{3}dedicated to All Souls until 1977 ^{4}dedicated 1828, previously proprietary chapel ^{5}dedicated to St James until rebuilding

=== Deanery of Islington ===
Benefice	Churches	Founded (building)	Population served
Barnsbury (St Andrew)	St Andrew Thornhill Square, Caledonian Road	1854	16,070
Barnsbury (St Andrew)	All Saints, Caledonian Road	1838 (1975)	16,070
Barnsbury (St Andrew)	The Church on the Corner, Islington	1994	16,070
Canonbury (St Stephen)	St Stephen, Canonbury	1839	8,039
Clerkenwell (St James and St John) (St Peter)	Inspire St James Clerkenwell	APC (1792)	6,449
Clerkenwell (Our Most Holy Redeemer)	Our Most Holy Redeemer, Clerkenwell	1888	6,856
Clerkenwell (St Mark)	St Mark Myddelton Square, Clerkenwell	1827	6,856
Clerkenwell (St Mark)	Trinity Church Islington^{2}	2007	6,856
Finsbury (St Clement) (St Barnabas) (St Matthew)	St Clement King Square, Finsbury^{1}	1823 (1952)	6,941
Finsbury Park (St Thomas)	St Thomas the Apostle, Finsbury Park	1880 (1889)	8,196
Highbury (Christ Church) (St John) (St Saviour)	Christ Church, Highbury	1848	9,111
Highbury New Park (St Augustine)	St Augustine, Highbury New Park	1864 (1870)	8,377
Holloway, West (St Luke)	St Luke, West Holloway	1855 (1861) (1961)	13,877
Hope Church Islington (St Mary Magdalene) (St David)	St Mary Magdalene, Islington	1814	16,517
Hope Church Islington (St Mary Magdalene) (St David)	St David, Islington	1869 (1936)	16,517
Hornsey Rise (St Mary)	St Mary, Hornsey Rise	1861	9,307
Whitehall Park (St Andrew)	St Andrew, Whitehall Park	1887 (1895)	6,069
Holloway, Upper (St John the Evangelist)	St John the Evangelist, Upper Holloway	1828	10,719
Islington (St James the Apostle) (St Peter)	St James the Apostle, Islington	1872 (1875)	10,339
Islington (St Mary)	St Mary, Islington	APC (1754)	6,128
Mildmay Grove (St Jude and St Paul)	St Jude (& St Paul) Mildmay, Islington	1855	14,995
Pentonville (St Silas with All Saints) (St James)	St Silas, Pentonville	1863	5,972
King's Cross	King's Cross Church	2010	5,972
Tollington (St Mark)	St Mark, Tollington Park	c. 1853	25,345
Tollington (St Mark)	Emmanuel, Holloway	1881 (1884)	25,345
Tollington (St Mark)	St Saviour, Tollington Park	1888	25,345
Tufnell Park (St George and All Saints)	St George, Tufnell Park	1858 (1867) (1975)	12,628

^{1}dedicated to St Barnabas until 1954 ^{2}uses St Mark's building

=== Deanery of Tower Hamlets ===
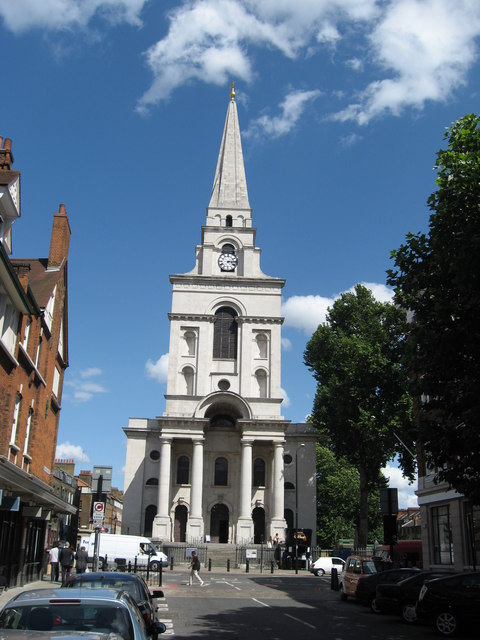
Christ Church, Spitalfields, restored in 2004

Benefice	Churches	Founded (building)	Population served
Bethnal Green (St Barnabas)	St Barnabas, Bethnal Green	1870 (1957)	3,649
Bethnal Green (St James the Less)	St James the Less, Bethnal Green	1842	5,641
Bethnal Green (St Matthew with St James the Great)	St Matthew, Bethnal Green	1743	12,272
Bethnal Green (St Peter) (St Thomas)	St Peter, Bethnal Green	1841	9,069
Bow (St Mary) & Holy Trinity with Bromley St Leonard	St Mary, Bow	MC	23,145
Bow Common (St Paul)	St Paul, Bow Common	1858 (1960)	6,912
Bromley By Bow (All Hallows)	All Hallows, Bow	1874 (1955)	6,196
Isle of Dogs (Christ Church and St John) (St Luke)	Christ Church, Isle of Dogs	1857	32,052
Isle of Dogs (Christ Church and St John) (St Luke)	St Luke, Millwall	1868 (1960) (2018)	32,052
Limehouse (St Anne) (St Peter)	St Anne, Limehouse	1730	13,115
Limehouse (St Anne) (St Peter)	St Peter's Barge, Canary Wharf	2004	13,115
London Docks (St Peter) with Wapping St John	St Peter, London Docks	1856 (1866)	8,933
Old Ford (St Paul) (St Mark)	St Paul, Old Ford	1878	15,551
Poplar (All Saints)	All Saints, Poplar	1823	28,849
Poplar (All Saints)	St Nicholas, Poplar	1955	28,849
Shadwell (St Paul) with Ratcliffe St James	St Paul, Shadwell	1656 (1821)	6,088
Spitalfields (Christ Church with All Saints)	Christ Church, Spitalfields	1729	12,526
St George-In-The-East (St Mary)	St Mary Cable Street, St George-in-the-East	1850	5,686
St George-In-The-East with St Paul	St George in the East, St George-in-the-East	1729	12,241
St John on Bethnal Green	St John on Bethnal Green	1828	21,869
Stepney (St Dunstan and All Saints)	St Dunstan & All Saints, Stepney^{1}	APC	28,415

^{1}dedication to All Saints added in 1952

== Archdeaconry of Northolt ==
=== Deanery of Brent ===
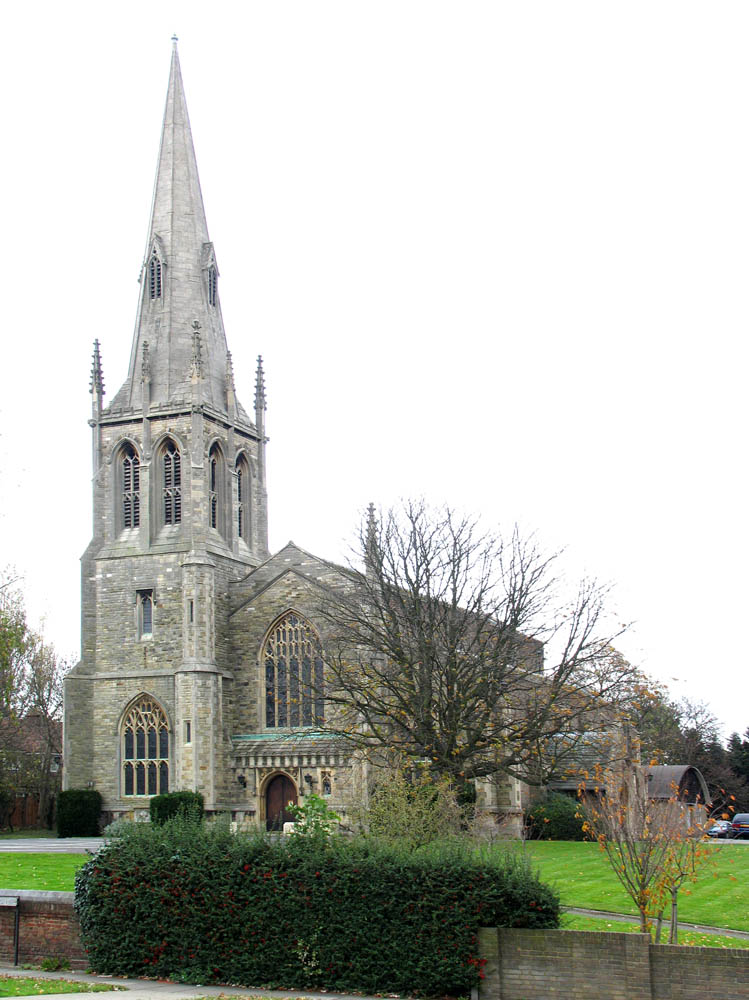
New St Andrew's Church in Kingsbury was built as a replacement for the older church, which is no longer used for Anglican worship.

Benefice	Churches	Founded (building)	Population served
Alperton (St James)	St James, Alperton	1896 (1912) (1990)	16,581
Brondesbury (Christ Church) (St Laurence)	Christ Church, Brondesbury	1867	18,032
Brondesbury St Anne with Kilburn (Holy Trinity)	St Anne, Brondesbury	1899 (1905)	11,965
Cricklewood (St Gabriel) and St Michael	St Gabriel, Cricklewood	1891 (1897)	14,206
Harlesden (All Souls)	All Souls, Harlesden	1869 (1879)	18,099
Kensal Rise (St Mark)	St Mark, Kensal Rise	1903 (1914)	8,820
Kensal Rise (St Martin)	St Martin, Kensal Rise	1899	4,807
Kenton, South (Annunciation)	Annunciation, South Kenton	1938	5,449
Kingsbury (Holy Innocents)	Holy Innocents, Kingsbury	1884 (1930s)	25,620
Kingsbury (St Andrew)	(New) St Andrew, Kingsbury	1933	16,125
Neasden (St Catherine with St Paul)	St Catherine, Neasden	1901 (1916)	22,048
Preston (Church of the Ascension)	Ascension, Wembley Park	1937 (1957)	11,221
Stonebridge (St Michael and All Angels)	St Michael & All Angels, Stonebridge	1876 (1891)	10,593
Sudbury (St Andrew)	St Andrew, Sudbury	1905 (1926)	15,310
Tokyngton (St Michael)	St Michael, Tokyngton	1926 (1933)	15,217
Wembley (St John the Evangelist)	St John the Evangelist, Wembley	1846	17,056
Wembley Park (St Augustine)	St Augustine, Wembley Park	1912 (1926) (1954)	14,377
Wembley, North (St Cuthbert)	St Cuthbert, North Wembley	1938 (1959)	5,858
Willesden (St Mary)	St Mary, Willesden	APC	10,786
Willesden (St Matthew)	St Matthew, Willesden	1894 (1901)	8,657
Willesden Green (St Andrew) (St Francis of Assisi)	St Andrew, Willesden Green	1880 (1887)	17,073
Willesden Green (St Andrew) (St Francis of Assisi)	St Francis of Assisi, Willesden Green	1911 (1933)	17,073

=== Deanery of Ealing ===
Benefice	Churches	Founded (building)	Population served
The Oak Tree Anglican Fellowship	OakTree Anglican Fellowship, Acton	c. 2000	N/A
Acton (St Mary)	St Mary, Acton	APC (1865)	12,419
Acton Green (St Peter) (All Saints)	All Saints, South Acton	1872	16,478
Acton Green (St Peter) (All Saints)	St Peter, Acton Green	1906 (1915)	16,478
Acton, East (St Dunstan with St Thomas)	St Dunstan, East Acton	1879	15,803
Acton, North (St Gabriel)	St Gabriel the Archangel, North Acton	1923 (1931)	7,507
Acton, West (St Martin)	St Martin, West Acton	1903 (1906)	5,146
Ealing (All Saints)	All Saints, Ealing	1905	6,071
Ealing (Christ the Saviour)	Christ the Saviour, Ealing^{1}	1853	5,826
Ealing (St Barnabas)	St Barnabas, Ealing	1905 (1916)	6,659
Ealing (St Mary)	St Mary, Ealing	APC (1740)	11,303
Ealing (St Paul)	St Paul Northfields, Ealing	1907	10,042
Hanwell (St Mellitus with St Mark)	St Mellitus, Hanwell	1910	10,042
Ealing (St Peter) Mount Park	St Peter Mount Park, Ealing	1882 (1893)	6,715
Ealing (St Stephen) Castle Hill	St Stephen Castle Hill, Ealing	1867 (1876) (1986)	15,667
Ealing Common (St Matthew)	St Matthew, Ealing Common	1872 (1884)	3,964
Ealing, West (St John) with St James	St John, West Ealing	1865 (1876) (1923)	14,167
Ealing, West (St John) with St James	St James, West Ealing	1890 (1904)	14,167
Greenford (Holy Cross) (St Edward the Confessor)	(Old) Holy Cross, Greenford	APC	17,039
Greenford (Holy Cross) (St Edward the Confessor)	(New) Holy Cross, Greenford	1940	17,039
Greenford, North (All Hallows)	All Hallows, North Greenford	1931	9,023
Hanger Hill (Ascension) and West Twyford	Ascension Hanger Hill, Ealing	1939	8,983
Hanger Hill (Ascension) and West Twyford	St Mary, West Twyford	MC	8,983
Hanwell (St Christopher)	St Christopher, Hanwell	1937	15,518
Hanwell (St Mary)	St Mary, Hanwell	APC (1842)	15,518
Hanwell (St Thomas)	St Thomas the Apostle, Hanwell	1907 (1933)	8,555
Northolt (St Joseph the Worker) (St Hugh) West End	St Joseph the Worker, Northolt	1942 (1959) (1969)	22,399
Northolt (St Joseph the Worker) (St Hugh) West End	St Hugh, Northolt	1954 (1971)	22,399
Northolt (St Mary) (St Richard)	St Mary, Northolt	APC	14,932
Northolt (St Mary) (St Richard)	St Richard, Northolt	1960	14,932
Northolt Park (St Barnabas)	St Barnabas, Northolt Park	1940 (1954)	12,956
Norwood Green (St Mary the Virgin)	St Mary the Virgin, Norwood Green	MC	8,845
Perivale (St Nicholas)	St Nicholas, Perivale	1934 (1963)	13,474
Southall (Christ the Redeemer)	Christ the Redeemer, Southall	1935 (1964)	14,707
Southall (Emmanuel)	Emmanuel, Southall	1974	7,857
Southall (Holy Trinity)	Holy Trinity, Southall	1874 (1890)	16,355
Southall (St George)	St George, Southall	1906	10,950
Southall Green (St John)	St John, Southall Green	1838	22,169

^{1}named Christ Church until 1952

=== Deanery of Harrow ===
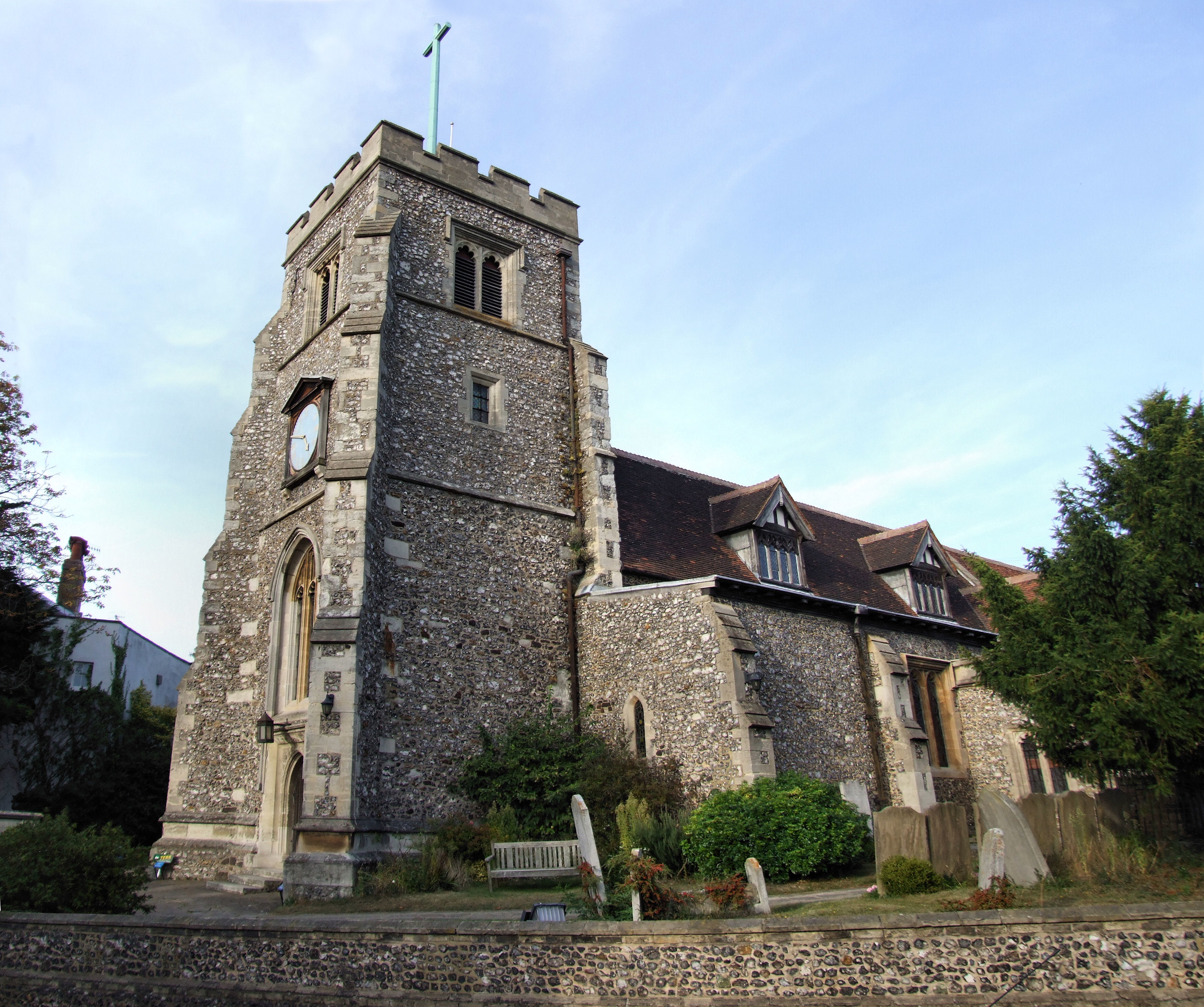
St John the Baptist, Pinner

Benefice	Churches	Founded (building)	Population served
Belmont (St Anselm)	St Anselm, Belmont	1941	15,493
Greenhill (St John the Baptist)	St John the Baptist, Greenhill	1866 (1904)	13,703
Harrow on the Hill (St Mary)	St Mary, Harrow on the Hill	APC	6,344
Harrow Weald (All Saints)	All Saints, Harrow Weald^{1}	1815 (1843)	19,632
Harrow Weald (St Michael and All Angels)	St Michael & All Angels, Harrow Weald	1935 (1958)	9,103
Harrow, North (St Alban)	St Alban, North Harrow	1930 (1937)	14,774
Harrow, South (St Paul)	St Paul, South Harrow	1928 (1937)	16,077
Harrow, West (St Peter)	St Peter, North Harrow	1907 (1913)	4,561
Hatch End (St Anselm)	St Anselm, Hatch End^{2}	1865 (1895)	7,749
Headstone (St George)	St George, Headstone	1907 (1911)	13,640
Kenton (St Mary the Virgin)	St Mary the Virgin, Kenton	1927 (1936)	26,919
Northwood (Emmanuel)	Emmanuel, Northwood	1896 (1904)	10,657
Northwood (Holy Trinity)	Holy Trinity, Northwood	1854	8,759
Northwood Hills (St Edmund the King)	St Edmund the King, Northwood Hills	1935 (1964)	7,811
Pinner (St John the Baptist)	St John the Baptist, Pinner	MC	14,956
Queensbury (All Saints)	All Saints, Queensbury	1933 (1954)	20,161
Roxbourne (St Andrew)	St Andrew, Roxbourne	1957	14,559
Roxeth (Christ Church)	Christ Church, Roxeth	1862	10,068
Stanmore, Great (St John the Evangelist)	St John the Evangelist, Stanmore	APC (1632) (1850)	11,576
Stanmore, Little (St Lawrence)	St Lawrence, Little Stanmore	APC	15,290
Wealdstone (Holy Trinity)	Holy Trinity, Wealdstone	1882	11,839

^{1}1815 dedication to St Andrew ^{2}1865 dedication to All Saints

=== Deanery of Hillingdon ===
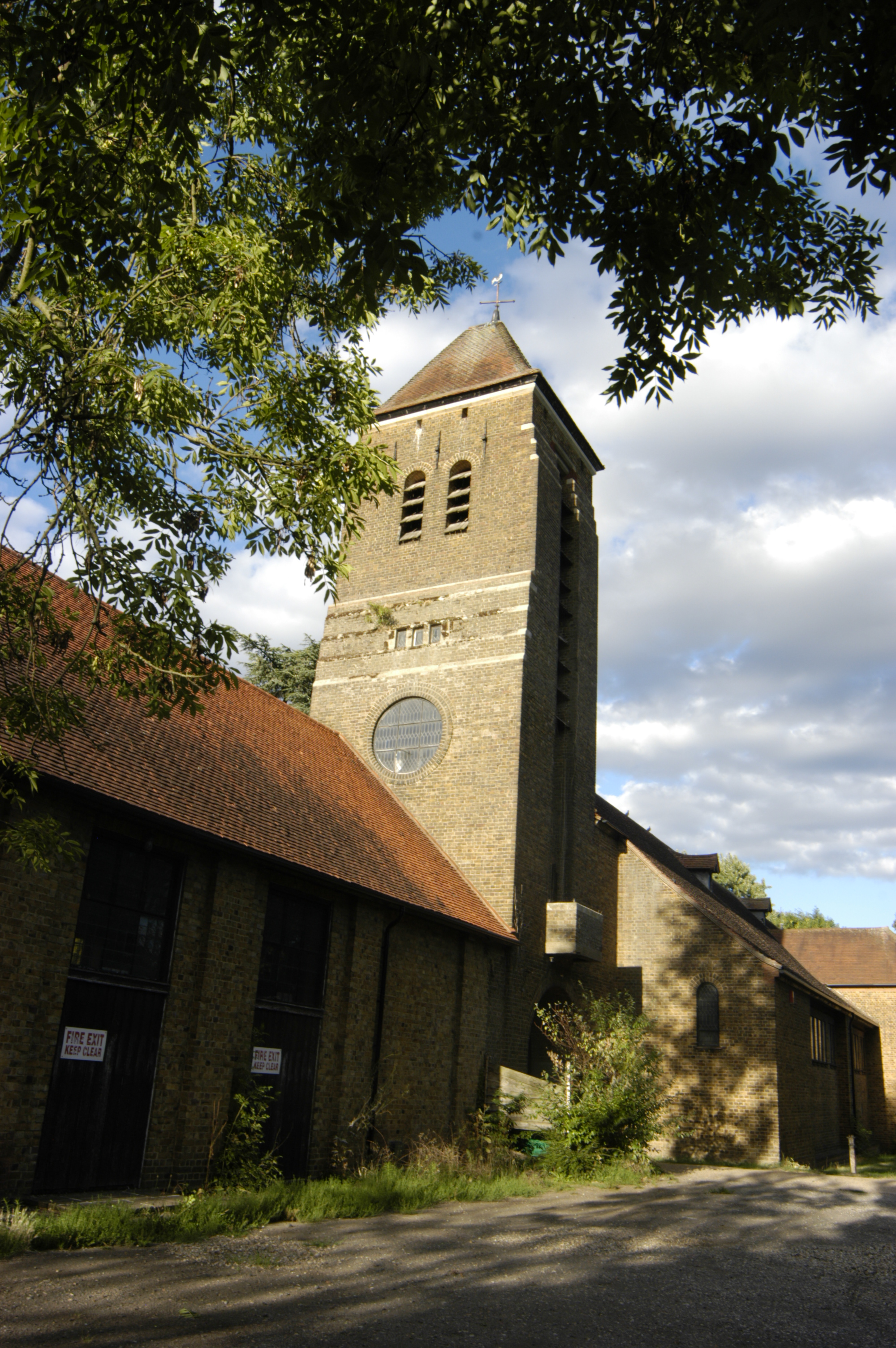
St. Jerome, Dawley, designed by J. Harold Gibbons 1933. August 2013.

Benefice	Churches	Founded (building)	Population served
Cowley (St Laurence)	St Laurence, Cowley	APC	11,892
Drayton, West (St Martin)	St Martin, West Drayton	APC	11,978
Eastcote (St Lawrence)	St Lawrence, Eastcote	1920 (1933)	22,409
Harefield (St Mary the Virgin)	St Mary, Harefield	APC	8,100
Harlington (St Peter and St Paul)	SS Peter & Paul, Harlington	APC	11,166
Harmondsworth (St Mary the Virgin)	St Mary the Virgin, Harmondsworth	APC	3,691
Hayes (St Anselm)	St Anselm, Hayes	1914 (1929)	12,293
Hayes (St Edmund of Canterbury)	St Edmund of Canterbury, Yeading	1890 (1933) (1961)	22,012
Hayes (St Mary)	St Mary, Hayes	APC	20,607
Hayes, North (St Nicholas)	St Nicholas, North Hayes	1937 (1961)	9,018
Hayes, West (Christ Church) (St Jerome)	Christ Church, West Hayes	1937 (1965)	11,838
Hayes, West (Christ Church) (St Jerome)	St Jerome, Dawley	1910 (1934)	11,838
Hillingdon (All Saints)	All Saints, North Hillingdon	1930 (1934)	10,628
Hillingdon (St John the Baptist)	St John the Baptist, Hillingdon	APC	20,050
Ickenham (St Giles)	St Giles, Ickenham	APC	11,367
Ruislip (St Martin)	St Martin, Ruislip	APC	14,300
Ruislip (St Mary)	St Mary, South Ruislip	1931 (1959)	14,165
Ruislip Manor (St Paul)	St Paul, Ruislip Manor	1937	10,868
Uxbridge (St Andrew) (St Margaret) (St Peter)	St Andrew, Uxbridge	1865	13,576
Uxbridge (St Andrew) (St Margaret) (St Peter)	St Margaret, Uxbridge	MC	13,576
Yiewsley (St Matthew)	St Matthew, Yiewsley	1859	13,161

== Former churches ==
Church	Founded (building)	Closed
St Andrew, Acton	1880s (1894)	c. 1950
St Cuthbert, Acton	c. 1880	c. 1934
St Saviour, Acton	1873 (1925)	2014
St Thomas, Acton Vale^{9}	1884 (1915)	1995
St Saviour, Alexandra Park	1904	1994
St Michael, Ashford	MC	1856
St Thomas, Barnsbury	1860	c. 1953
Ascension Chapel, Bayswater^{19}	1765 (1890)	1941
Episcopal Jews' Chapel, Bethnal Green	1814	1895
St Andrew, Bethnal Green	1841	1960
St Bartholomew, Bethnal Green	1843	1983
St Francis of Assisi, Bethnal Green^{21}	1888 (1920)	1941
St George's Chapel, Bethnal Green	C16th	C17th
St James the Great, Bethnal Green	1844	1984
St Jude, Bethnal Green	1846	post-WW2
St Martin, Bethnal Green	1899	1939
St Matthias, Bethnal Green	1847	1957
St Paul, Bethnal Green	1864	1941
St Philip the Apostle, Bethnal Green	1842	1952
St Simon Zelotes, Bethnal Green	1846	1944
St Thomas, Bethnal Green	1844	c. 1950
Christ Church Woburn Square, Bloomsbury	1832	1974
St John's Chapel, Bloomsbury	1721	1863
St Gabriel, Bounds Green^{8}	1883 (1906)	c. 1995
Holy Trinity, Bow	1839	1984
Christ Church, Bromley-by-Bow	1884	?
St Andrew, Bromley-by-Bow	1900	post-1952
St Gabriel, Bromley-by-Bow	1873	post-1952
St Mary, Bromley-by-Bow	1536	1940s
St Michael & All Angels, Bromley-by-Bow	1867	1975
St Laurence, Brondesbury	1901 (1906)	1971
St Michael & All Angels, Brunswick Park^{22}	1896 (1902)	1970s
St Matthias, Caledonian Road^{10}	1868 (1886)	1978
All Saints, Camden Town	1822	1948
Christ Church, Camden Town	1844	c. 1931
Holy Trinity, Camden Town	1831 (1910)	
St Matthew Oakley Square, Camden Town	1854	1977
St Peter Saffron Hill, Camden Town	1832	1955
St Thomas Agar Town, Camden Town	1864	c. 1945
St Mary, Charterhouse	1862	1940
St Thomas, Charterhouse	1842	1906
St John the Evangelist Tadema Road, Chelsea	1873 (1876)	1940
St Jude Turk's Row, Chelsea	1844	1934
St Matthew, Chelsea	1874	post-1930
All Saints, Chiswick	1901	c. 1935
St Mary Magdalene, Chiswick	1848	1955
All Hallows Bread Street, City of London	APC	
All Hallows Honey Lane, City of London	APC	1666
All Hallows Lombard Street, City of London	APC	
All Hallows Staining, City of London	APC	
All-Hallows-the-Great, City of London	APC	
All-Hallows-the-Less, City of London	APC	1666
Christ Church Greyfriars, City of London	APC	
Holy Trinity Gough Square, City of London	1837	1906
Holy Trinity the Less, City of London	APC (1606)	1666
St Alban Wood Street, City of London	APC	
St Alphage London Wall, City of London	APC	
St Andrew Hubbard, City of London	APC	1666
St Andrew Undershaft, City of London	APC	
St Ann Blackfriars, City of London	1550 (1597)	1666
St Anne and St Agnes, City of London	APC	
St Antholin Budge Row, City of London	APC	
St Audoen within Newgate, City of London	APC	1547
St Augustine Papey, City of London	APC	1442
St Augustine Watling Street, City of London	APC	
St Bartholomew-by-the-Exchange, City of London	APC	
St Benet Fink, City of London	APC	
St Benet Gracechurch, City of London	APC	
St Benet Sherehog, City of London^{4}	APC	1666
St Botolph Billingsgate, City of London	APC	1666
St Christopher le Stocks, City of London	APC	
St Clement Eastcheap, City of London	APC	
St Dionis Backchurch, City of London	APC	
St Dunstan-in-the-East, City of London	APC	
St Edmund King and Martyr, City of London	APC	
St Ethelburga Bishopsgate, City of London	APC	
St Faith under St Paul's, City of London	APC	1256/1666
St Gabriel Fenchurch, City of London^{1}	APC	1666
St George Botolph Lane, City of London	APC	
St Gregory by St Paul's, City of London	APC	1666
St James Duke's Place, City of London	1622 (1727)	1874
St John the Baptist upon Walbrook, City of London	APC	1666
St John the Evangelist Friday Street, City of London^{2}	APC	1666
St John Zachary, City of London	APC	1666
St Katherine Coleman, City of London^{1}	APC	
St Laurence Pountney, City of London	APC	1666
St Leonard Eastcheap, City of London	APC (1618)	1666
St Leonard Foster Lane, City of London	APC	1666
St Margaret Moses, City of London	APC	1666
St Margaret New Fish Street, City of London	APC	1666
St Martin Orgar, City of London	APC	1666
St Martin Outwich, City of London	APC	
St Martin Pomary, City of London	APC	
St Martin Vintry, City of London	APC	
St Mary Aldermanbury, City of London	APC	
St Mary Axe, City of London	APC	1562
St Mary Bothaw, City of London	APC	
St Mary Colechurch, City of London	APC	
St Mary Mounthaw, City of London	APC	
St Mary Somerset, City of London	APC	
St Mary Staining, City of London	APC	
St Mary Woolchurch Haw, City of London	APC	
St Mary Magdalen Milk Street, City of London	APC	
St Mary Magdalen Old Fish Street, City of London	APC	
St Matthew Friday Street, City of London	APC	
St Michael Bassishaw, City of London	APC	
St Michael Crooked Lane, City of London	APC	
St Michael-le-Querne, City of London	APC	
St Michael Paternoster Royal, City of London	APC	
St Michael Queenhithe, City of London	APC	
St Michael Wood Street, City of London	APC	
St Mildred Bread Street, City of London	APC	
St Mildred Poultry, City of London	APC	
St Nicholas Acons, City of London	APC	
St Nicholas Bread Street, City of London	APC	
St Nicholas Olave, City of London	Medieval	
St Nicholas Shambles, City of London	APC	1547
St Olave Bread Street, City of London	APC	
St Olave Old Jewry, City of London	APC	
St Olave Silver Street, City of London	APC	
St Pancras Soper Lane, City of London	APC	
St Peter le Poer, City of London	APC	
St Peter Paul's Wharf, City of London	APC	
St Peter upon Cornhill, City of London	APC	
St Peter Westcheap, City of London	APC	
St Stephen Coleman Street, City of London	APC	
St Swithin London Stone, City of London	APC	
Chapel of St Thomas on the Bridge, City of London^{3}	MC (1384)	1548
St Thomas the Apostle, City of London	APC	
All Saints, Clapton Park	1870	1973
Christ Church, Clapton	1871	1944
Good Shepherd, Upper Clapton	1874 (1879)	1947
Holy Trinity, Upper Clapton	1878	C20th
All Saints Caledonia Road, Clerkenwell	pre-1838	1975
All Saints Skinner Street, Clerkenwell	1830	c. 1869
St John the Baptist, Clerkenwell	c. 1725	1931
St Paul Old Street, Clerkenwell	1875	1940s
St Paul Pear Tree Street, Clerkenwell	1875	1940
St Peter, Clerkenwell	1871	1957
St Philip Granville Square, Clerkenwell	1832	1936
St Michael, Cricklewood	1910	1992
Little St Peter, Cricklewood	1958	1983
St Andrew's Mission Church, Crouch End	1890	1907
St Bartholomew, Dalston	1897	1953
St Philip, Dalston	c. 1840	c. 1950
Good Shepherd, Ealing	1905	1978
St Luke, Ealing	1901	1952
St Saviour, Ealing	1899	1951
St Matthias, Earl's Court	1871	1958
St Alban, Edmonton	1888	c. 1935
St James, Edmonton	1839 (1849)	1980s
St Martin, Edmonton	1900 (1911)	1977
St Mary Fore Street, Edmonton	1884 (1970)	pre-2013
St Michael, Edmonton^{6}	1882 (1901)	1982
St Saviour Bury Street, Edmonton^{7}	1882 (1902)	c. 1935
St Barnabas Addison Road, Enfield		?
St Giles, Enfield	1954	?
St Catherine, Feltham	1880	1976
St Luke, Finchley	1905	1985
St Clement Lever Street, Finsbury	1880	1941
St Matthew City Road, Finsbury	c. 1848	1940
St Paul Bunhill Road, Finsbury	1839	1932
St James the Great, Friern Barnet	APC	?
St Augustine, Fulham	1901 (1941)	?
St James Moore Park, Fulham	1868	1976
St Oswald, Fulham	1893	1973
St Michael, Golders Green	1910 (1914)	1979
St Edward the Confessor, Greenford	1936	
St James, Gunnersbury	1887	c. 1990
Christ Church, South Hackney	1871	1953
Kingsland Chapel, Hackney	1760 (C13th)	1845
St Andrew's Mission Church, Hackney^{20}	1810 (1880)	c. 1942
St Augustine of Canterbury Victoria Park, Hackney	1867	1953
St Bartholomew, Hackney	1874 (1885)	1940s
St James, West Hackney	1823	1941
St Martin London Fields, Hackney	1894 (1906)	1939
St Augustine Yorkton Street, Haggerston	1867	1983
St Columba, Haggerston	1864 (1869)	1975
St Mary, Haggerston	1827	1941
St Paul, Haggerston	1860	1970
St Stephen, Haggerston	1865	c. 1953
St John the Evangelist, Hammersmith	1860	2005
St Mary Stamford Brook, Hammersmith	1888	1982
All Souls, Hampstead	1865	1985
St Andrew's Mission Church, Hampstead		1948
St Paul Avenue Road, Hampstead	1859	1956
St Stephen Rosslyn Hill, Hampstead	1869	1977
St Stephen the Martyr Avenue Road, Hampstead	1849	1945
St Mark, Hanwell	1879	
St Cecilia, Harlesden	1895	1956
St Peter, Harringay	1884	1977
St Barnabas, Harrow Weald	1950	1970s
St Saviour, Heathrow	1880	?
St Mary Magdalene, Hendon	1934	
St John, Highbury Park	1875 (1881)	1979
St Saviour Aberdeen Park, Highbury	1866	1980
St Peter, Dartmouth Park	1874	1980s
Holy Trinity Gray's Inn Road, Holborn	1838	1931
St Bartholomew Gray's Inn Road, Holborn	1860 (1811)	1959
St John the Evangelist, Holborn	1869	1941
St Francis of Assisi, Holloway	1903 (1976)	?
St James, Lower Holloway	1838	1954
Ram Chapel, Homerton	1740s	1934
St Paul, Homerton	1885 (1891)	1982
St Luke, Hornsey	1898 (1903)	1980
New St Mary, Hornsey	1889	1969
Old St Mary, Hornsey	APC (1833)	1888
St Peter West Green, Hornsey	1898	1977
Christ Church, Hoxton	1839	1953
St Andrew, Hoxton	1863	1941
St Mary, Hoxton	1866	1941
St Peter, Hoxton	1869	1937
St Saviour, Hoxton	1861 (1866)	1941
St Cuthbert, Isle of Dogs	1897	1940
St John Cubitt Town, Isle of Dogs	1873	1965
St Mary's Chapel, Isle of Dogs	MC	?
All Saints White Lion Street, Islington	c. 1838	c. 1953
Holy Trinity, Islington	1828	1980
St Anne Poole's Park, Islington	1866 (1870) (1960)	1970
St Barnabas Hornsey Road, Islington	1856 (1866)	1945
St Bartholomew, Islington	1862	c. 1970
St Clement, Islington	1857 (1865)	1970s
St John the Baptist, Islington	1866 (1872)	1971
St John the Evangelist Copenhagen Street, Islington	1879	c. 1960
St Matthew Essex Road, Islington	1836 (1849)	c. 1960
St Michael York Way, Islington	1853 (1864)	1973
St Padarn's Welsh Church, Islington	1903	1970s
St Paul Essex Road, Islington	1828	1982
St Paul Kingsdown Road, Islington	1870	1953
St Peter, Islington Green	1835	1981
St Philip the Evangelist, Islington	1855	1953
St Saviour Aberdeen Park, Islington	1866	1981
St Stephen Elthorne Road, Islington	1877 (1880)	1980
St Jude, Kensal Green	1879	1959
St Peter's Mission Church, Kensal Rise		c. 1966
SS Andrew & Philip, Kensal Town	1870	c. 1951
St Jude, Kensington	1870	2006^{5}
St Peter Cranley Gardens, Kensington	1867	1973
St Barnabas, Kentish Town	1884	1957
St John the Baptist, Kentish Town	MC (1784)	1993
Holy Trinity, Kilburn	1867	1950
St John the Evangelist, Kilburn	1850s (1871)	1971
St Paul Kilburn Square, Kilburn	1825	1936
Old St Andrew, Kingsbury	APC	1977
All Saints, Knightsbridge	1849	1955
Holy Trinity, Knightsbridge	c. 1725 (1861)	1904
Episcopal Floating Church, Limehouse Docks	1825	1845
St John the Evangelist, Limehouse	1853	c. 1950
St Peter, Limehouse	1884	1971
Emmanuel, Maida Vale^{14}	1834	1950
St Matthew, Maida Vale	1853	c. 1945
Bentinck Chapel, Marylebone	C18th	c. 1830
Brunswick Chapel, Marylebone	1796	C20th
Christ Church Cosway Street, Marylebone	1824	1977
Good Shepherd Mission Church, Marylebone	1884	1907
Holy Trinity, Marylebone	1828	1936
St Andrew Wells Street, Marylebone	1846	1933
St Barnabas Bell Street, Marylebone	1866	1946
St James, Marylebone^{16}	1760s	1901
St John the Evangelist, Marylebone	APC	C14th
St Luke Nutford Place, Marylebone	1849	1947
St Mark, Marylebone	1872	1980
Old St Mary, Marylebone	C14th	1949
St Paul Great Portland Street, Marylebone^{17}	1764	1907
St Paul Portman Square, Marylebone^{18}	1779 (1870)	1972
St Peter Vere Street, Marylebone^{15}	1722	c. 1970s
St Thomas Portman Square, Marylebone	1858	1951
Mayfair/Curzon/Keith's/St George's Chapel, Mayfair	1730	1898
St Mark, Mayfair	1828	1974
St Mary Bourdon Street, Mayfair	1880	1950s
Trinity Chapel Conduit Street, Mayfair	1691	1875
All Saints, Mile End New Town	1838	1951
St Olave, Mile End New Town	1875	1914
Holy Trinity, Mile End Old Town	1839	1984
St Benet, Mile End Old Town	1870	1940
St Luke Burdett Road, Mile End Old Town	1869	1941
St Philip the Apostle, Mile End Old Town	1819 (1892)	1979
St Mary's Chapel, Muswell Hill	MC	C15th
St Matthew, Muswell Hill	1926 (1940)	1978
St Raphael, Neasden	1899 (1910) (1924)	c. 1972
St Lawrence, New Brentford	MC (1764)	1961
Eastbury Church, Northwood	c. 1995	c. 2020
Hillside Community Church, Northwood	C20th	?
Christ Church, Notting Hill	1881	1940
Holy Trinity Latimer Road, Notting Hill	1885	1965
St Columb, Notting Hill	1900	1952
St Mark, Notting Hill	1864	1972
St George, Old Brentford	1762 (c. 1890)	1959
St Mark, Old Ford	1873	1973
St Stephen, Old Ford	c. 1827	post-WW2
St Luke, Old Street	1733	1959
All Saints Norfolk Square, Paddington	1848 (1895)/1952	1919/1961
Christ Church Harrow Road, Paddington	c. 1871	1940
Christ Church Lancaster Gate, Paddington	1855	1977
Holy Trinity, Paddington	1846	1971
St David's Welsh Church, Paddington	1885 (1896)	C21st
St Luke Tavistock Road, Paddington	1868	1963
St Martha, Paddington	1880	1957
St Michael & All Angels, Paddington	1864	1964
St Paul Harrow Road, Paddington	1874	1947
St Philip, Paddington	1861	1893
St Simon Saltram Crescent, Paddington	1899	1978
St James, Pentonville	1778	1978
St Stephen / All Saints, Pentonville	1838	1958
St Mary, Perivale	APC	1972
All Saints, Pimlico	1863	c. 1967
St John the Evangelist, Pimlico	1874	1940
St Frideswide, Poplar	1880s	1947
St Matthias, Poplar	1857 (1654)	1977
St Saviour, Poplar	1874	1975
St Stephen, Poplar	1867	1950s
St James, Ratcliff	1838	1951
Christ Church Watney Street, St George-in-the-East	1841	1951
St John the Evangelist, St George-in-the-East	1869	
St Matthew Pell Street, St George-in-the-East	1859 (1805)	1891
St Paul Dock Street, St George-in-the-East	1825 (1847)	1971
Christ Church Endell Street, St Giles	1845	1929
Holy Trinity Kingsway, St Giles	1831 (1909)	1986
All Saints, St John's Wood	1846	1974
All Souls, St John's Wood	1865	
St Stephen, St John's Wood	1848	1952
Christ Church, Albany Street	1837	1989
Christ Church Somers Town, St Pancras	1868	1941
St James Hampstead Road, St Pancras	1791	pre-1954
St John the Evangelist Fitzroy Square, St Pancras	c. 1845	1940s
St Jude Grays Inn Road, St Pancras	1847	1935
St Luke Euston Road, St Pancras	1856	1867
St Peter Regent Square, St Pancras	1826	c. 1945
St Saviour Fitzroy Square, St Pancras^{23}	1788	1945
St Thomas, Shepherd's Bush		1960
Holy Trinity, Shoreditch	1866	1938
St Agatha, Shoreditch	1872	1915
St James, Shoreditch	1841	1935
St Mark Old Street, Shoreditch	1848	1937
St Michael & All Angels, Shoreditch	1862	1960s
St Mary Charing Cross Road, Soho	1850	1934
St Peter Great Windmill Street, Soho	1861	1954
St Mary, Spitalfields	1854	1910s
St Stephen, Spitalfields	1858	1910s
St John the Divine Vartry Road, Stamford Hill	1880 (1886) (1975)	late C20th
Christ Church Jamaica Street, Stepney	1877	1951
St Antony, Stepney	1879	1937
St Augustine, Stepney	1879	1951
St Faith's Mission Church, Stepney	1906	?
St Matthew, Stepney	1872	1941
St Peter, Stepney	1839	c. 1978
St Thomas, Stepney	1840	1940
All Saints, Stoke Newington	1873	1956
Holy Redeemer, Stoke Newington	1892	1939
St Faith, Stoke Newington	1868 (1873)	c. 1951
Old St Mary, Stoke Newington	APC	1858
St Peter, Stonebridge	1902	post-1937
St Alban, Teddington	1887	1967
St Barnabas, Temple Fortune	1890s (1915)	1994
St Michael's Chapel, Tokyngton	MC	C16th
St Andrew Blackboy Lane, Tottenham	1908	1970
St Peter Page Green, Tottenham	1883 (1893)	1973
All Saints, Tufnell Park	1881 (1885)	1975
Montpelier Chapel, Twickenham	1727	1875
St Paul's Mission Church, Twickenham	1937	
St John the Evangelist, Uxbridge	1838	1992
St Peter, Uxbridge	1906	c. 1983
St John the Evangelist, Wapping	1617 (1756)	1941
St Andrew, West Green	1910	post-1936
Christ Church Broadway, Westminster	1642 (1843)	1941
Holy Trinity Vauxhall Bridge Road, Westminster	1852	1954
St Andrew Ashley Place, Westminster	1855	1946
St Anselm Davies Street, Westminster^{11}	1824 (1891)	1938
St George's Chapel Albemarle Street, Westminster	c. 1800	c. 1903
Hanover Chapel (St George) Regent St, Westminster	1824	1896
St John the Baptist Gt Marlborough St, Westminster	1865 (1885)	1937
St John the Evangelist Causton St, Westminster	1958	1974
St John the Evangelist Drury Lane, Westminster^{13}	1760s	1938
St John the Evangelist Smith Square, Westminster	1728	1941
St Luke Berwick Street, Westminster	1708 (1838)	1936
St Mary Vincent Square, Westminster	1836	1923
St Michael Burleigh Street, Westminster	1834	1906
St Peter Palace Street, Westminster	1770	c. 1921
St Philip Buckingham Palace Road, Westminster	1890	c. 1940s
St Philip Regent Street, Westminster	1822	1904
St Thomas Regent Street, Westminster^{12}	1688 (1702)	1954
St Jude, Whitechapel	1846	1927
St Mark, Whitechapel	1839	1925
St Mary Matfelon, Whitechapel	MC	1952
Good Shepherd Mission Church, Willesden	1883	post-1908
St John the Baptist, Willesden	1901	post-1937
St Paul Oxgate, Willesden	1934 (1936)	1980
Good Shepherd, Wood Green	1916	1963
St John Brook Road, Wood Green	1898	C20th

^{1}original dedication to All Hallows ^{2}original dedication to St Werburga ^{3}original dedication to St Thomas Becket ^{4}original dedication to St Osyth ^{5}building now occupied by St Mellitus College, but still used by HTB for services ^{6}1882 dedication to St Barnabas ^{7}1882 dedication to St Martin ^{8}1883 dedication to St Peter ^{9}original dedication to St Barnabas ^{10}original dedication to St Luke ^{11}known as the Hanover Chapel before 1897 ^{12}known as the Tenison Chapel until 1869 ^{13}known as the Tavistock Chapel until 1855 ^{14}known as Christ Chapel until 1876 ^{15}known as the Oxford Chapel until 1832 ^{16}known as the Tichfield, later Welbeck, Chapel until 1831 ^{17}known as the Portland Chapel until 1831 ^{18}known as the Portman Chapel until 1831 ^{19}dedicated to St George until 1890 ^{20}original dedication to St John ^{21}original dedication to St Andrew ^{22}church existed in Diocese of St Albans, but when church closed parish boundaries changed so that site is now in the parish of St Paul, New Southgate, in London Diocese ^{23}known as the Fitzroy Chapel until 1863

== Dedications ==
=== Medieval churches (and chapelries) ===
- All Saints: Chelsea, Edmonton, Fulham, Isleworth, Laleham, London (Bread Street, by the Tower, Coleman, Fenchurch, Honey Lane, Lombard Street, on the Wall, Staining, the Great, the Less), Tottenham
- Christ Church: London (Greyfriars)
- Holy Cross: Greenford
- Holy Sepulchre: London (Newgate)
- Holy Trinity: London (the Less)
- St Alban: London (Wood Street)
- St Alphege: London (London Wall)
- St Andrew: Enfield, Kingsbury, London (by the Wardrobe, Holborn, Hubbard, Undershaft)
- SS Anne & Agnes: London
- St Anthony: London (Budge Row)
- St Audoen: London (Newgate)
- St Augustine of Canterbury: London (Papey, Watling Street)
- St Augustine of Hippo: Hackney
- St Bartholomew: London (by the Exchange, the Great, the Less)
- St Benedict: London (Fink, Gracechurch, Paul's Wharf)
- St Botolph: London (Aldersgate, Aldgate, Billingsgate, Bishopsgate)
- St Bridget: London (Fleet Street)
- St Catherine: London (Coleman, Cree)
- St Christopher: London (le Stocks)
- St Clement: London (Danes, Eastcheap)
- St Denis or St Dionysius: London (Backchurch)
- St Dunstan: Cranford, Feltham, London (in the East, in the West), Stepney
- St Edmund: London
- St Ethelburga: London (Bishopsgate)
- St Faith: London (under St Paul's)
- St George: Hanworth, London (Botolph Lane)
- St Giles: Ickenham, London (Cripplegate, in the Fields)
- St Gregory: London (by St Paul's)
- St Helen: London (Bishopsgate)
- St James: Clerkenwell, Friern Barnet, London (Garlickhythe)
- St John the Baptist: Hillingdon, Kentish Town, London (Walbrook, Zachary), Pinner
- St John the Evangelist: Hampstead, Marylebone, Stanmore
- St Lawrence: Cowley, Little Stanmore, London (Jewry, Pountney), New Brentford
- St Leonard: Heston, London (Eastcheap, Foster Lane), Shoreditch
- St Magnus: London
- St Margaret: Edgware, London (Lothbury, Moses, New Fish Street, Pattens), Uxbridge, Westminster
- St Martin: London (in the Fields, Ludgate, Orgar, Outwich, Pomeroy, Vintry), Ruislip, West Drayton
- St Mary: Acton, (Stratford-le-)Bow, Ealing, East Bedfont, Finchley, Hampton, Hanwell, Harefield, Harmondsworth, Harrow on the Hill, Hayes, Hendon, Hornsey, Isle of Dogs, Islington, Kensington, London (Abchurch, Aldermanbury, Aldermary, at Hill, Axe, Bothaw, Colechurch, le Bone, le Bow, le Strand, Mounthaw, Somerset, Staining, Woolchurch Haw, Woolnoth), Marylebone, Monken Hadley, Muswell Hill, Northolt, Norwood Green, Perivale, Staines, Stanwell, Stoke Newington, Sunbury, Teddington, Twickenham, West Twyford, Whitechapel, Willesden
- St Mary Magdalene: Littleton, London (Milk Street, Old Fish Street)
- St Matthew: London (Friday Street)
- St Michael: Ashford, Highgate, London (Bassishaw, Cornhill, Crooked Lane, le Querne, Paternoster Royal, Queenhithe, Wood Street), Tokyngton
- St Mildred: London (Bread Street, Poultry)
- St Nicholas: Chiswick, London (Acons, Bread Street, Cole Abbey, Olave, Shambles), Paddington, Shepperton
- St Olaf: London (Bread Street, Hart Street, Old Jewry, Silver Street)
- St Osyth: London (Sherehog)
- St Pancras: London (Soper Lane), St Pancras
- St Paul: London Cathedral
- St Peter: London (Cornhill, le Poer, Paul's Wharf, Westcheap), Westminster Abbey
- SS Peter & Paul: Harlington
- St Stephen: London (Coleman Street, Walbrook)
- St Swithin: London (London Stone)
- St Thomas: London
- St Thomas Becket: London Bridge
- St Vedast: London (Foster Lane)
- St Werburga: London (Friday Street)
- No dedication/dedication unknown: Temple Church

=== Post-medieval churches ===
- All Saints [35]: Acton (1872), Bow (1874), Caledonian Road (1838), Camden Town (1822), Childs Hill (1856), Chiswick (1901), Clapton (1870), Clerkenwell (x2, 1830s), Ealing (1905), Finchley (1891), Gospel Oak (1883), Greenford (1931), Haggerston (1856), Hampton (1929), Hanworth (1952), Harrow Weald (1843), Hatch End (1865), Highgate (1864), Hillingdon (1930), Islington (1838), Knightsbridge (1849), Marylebone (1850), Mile End (1838), Notting Hill (1852), Oakleigh Park (1883), Paddington (1848), Pimlico (1863), Poplar (1823), Queensbury (1933), St John's Wood (1846), Stoke Newington (1873), Tufnell Park (1881), Twickenham (x2) (1908, 1940)
- All Souls [6]: Clapton (1882), Hampstead (1865), Harlesden (1869), Langham Place (1824), St John's Wood (1865), St Margaret's-on-Thames (1886)
- Annunciation [2]: South Kenton (1938), Marble Arch (1912)
- Ascension [3]: Bayswater (1890), Ealing (1939), Wembley Park (1937)
- Christ Church [38]: Barnet (1845), Bloomsbury (1832), Bromley-by-Bow (1884), Brondesbury (1867), Camden Town (1844), Chelsea (1839), Clapton (1871), Cockfosters (1839), Crouch End (1862), Ealing (1853), Feltham (2019), Finchley (1864), Fulham (1903), Hackney (1871), Hampstead (1850), Hayes (1937), Hendon (1881), Highbury (1848), Hoxton (1839), Isle of Dogs (1857), Kensington (1851), Marylebone (1824), Mayfair (1865), Notting Hill (1881), Paddington (x2) (1855, 1871), Roxeth (1862), St George-in-the-East (1841), St Giles (1845), St Pancras (x2) (1837, 1868), Southgate (1862), Spitalfields (1729), Staines (1935), Stepney (1877), Turnham Green (1843), West Green (1882), Westminster (1843)
- Emmanuel [6]: Hampstead (1846), Holloway (1881), Maida Vale (1834), Northwood (1896), Paddington (1886), Southall (1974)
- Good Shepherd [7]: Clapton (1874), Ealing (1905), Hounslow (1957), Marylebone (1884), Tottenham (1890s), Willesden (1883), Wood Green (1916)
- Grace Church [2]: Hackney (2007), Highlands (2007)
- Holy Angels: Cranford (C19th)
- Holy Cross [2]: Greenford (1940), St Pancras (1888)
- Holy Innocents [3]: Hammersmith (1892), Hornsey (1875), Kingsbury (1884)
- Holy Redeemer / Christ the Redeemer [3]: Clerkenwell (1888), Southall (1935), Stoke Newington (1892)
- Holy Trinity / Trinity [32]: Bow (1839), Brompton (1829), Camden Town (1831), Chelsea (1830), Clapton (1878), Dalston (1879), Finchley (1846), Hampstead (1871), Holborn (1838), Hounslow (C16th), Hoxton (1848), Islington (x2) (1828, 2007), Kentish Town (1850), Kilburn (1867), Knightsbridge (1725), London (Gough Square) (1837), Marylebone (1828), Mayfair (1691), Mile End (1839), Northwood (1854), Notting Hill (1885), Paddington (1846), St Giles (1831), Shoreditch (1866), South Kensington (1901), Southall (1874), Stroud Green (1881), Tottenham (1829), Twickenham (1841), Wealdstone (1882), Westminster (1852), Winchmore Hill (1903)
- Jesus Church: Forty Hill (1835)
- John Keble: Mill Hill (1932)
- Risen Christ & All Souls: Clapton (1977)
- St Agatha: Shoreditch (1872)
- St Alban [7]: Acton (1882), Edmonton (1888), Fulham (1897), Golders Green (1910), Harrow (1930), Holborn (1861), Teddington (1887)
- St Aldhelm: Edmonton (1885)
- St Alphege [2]: Burnt Oak (1927), Edmonton (1897)
- St Andrew [26]: Acton (1880s), Alexandra Park (1900), Bethnal Green (x2) (1841, 1888), Bromley-by-Bow (1900), Caledonian Road (1854), Chelsea (1912), Crouch End (1890), Edgware (1937), Fulham (1874), Hackney (1880), Hampstead (pre-1948), Harrow Weald (1815), Hoxton (1863), Kingsbury (1933), Marylebone (1846), Roxbourne (1957), Southgate (1875), Stoke Newington (1876), Sudbury (1905), Tottenham (1908), Uxbridge (1865), West Green (1910), Westminster (1855), Whitehall Park (1887), Willesden Green (1880)
- SS Andrew & Philip: Kensal Town (1870)
- St Anne [8]: Brondesbury (1899), Highgate (1853), Hoxton (1870), Islington (1866), Limehouse (1730), London (Blackfriars) (1550), Soho (1677), Tottenham (1860)
- St Anselm [4]: Belmont (1941), Hatch End (1895), Hayes (1914), Westminster (1891)
- St Anthony: Stepney (1879)
- St Augustine of Canterbury [11]: Brompton (1868), Fulham (1901), Grahame Park (1975), Hackney (1867), Haggerston (1867), Highbury (1864), Highgate (1873), Kilburn (1870), Stepney (1879), Wembley Park (1912), Whitton (1935)
- St Barnabas [17]: Acton (1884), Bethnal Green (1870), Dalston (1890), Ealing (1905), Edmonton (1882), Enfield (?), Finsbury (1823), Harrow Weald (1950), Homerton (1847), Islington (1856), Kensington (1829), Kentish Town (1884), Marylebone (1866), Northolt (1940), Pimlico (1847), Temple Fortune (1890s), Woodside Park (1885)
- St Bartholomew [6]: Bethnal Green (1843), Dalston (1897), Hackney (1874), Holborn (1860), Islington (1862), Stamford Hill (1904)
- St Benedict [3]: Kentish Town (1881), Mile End (1870), Tottenham (1905)
- St Catherine [3]: Feltham (1880), Hammersmith (1922), Neasden (1901)
- St Cecilia: Harlesden (1895)
- St Chad: Haggerston (1869)
- St Christopher: Hanwell (1937)
- St Clement [4]: Finsbury (1880), Fulham (1886), Islington (1857), Notting Dale (1867)
- St Columba [2]: Haggerston (1864), Notting Hill (1900)
- St Cuthbert [6]: Acton (1880), Earl's Court (1884), Hampstead (1870s), Isle of Dogs (1897), Wembley (1938), Wood Green (1907)
- St Cyprian: Marylebone (1866)
- St David [2]: Islington (1869), Paddington (1885)
- St Denis or St Dionysius: Parsons Green (1886)
- St Dunstan: Acton (1879)
- St Edmund of Canterbury: Yeading (1933)
- St Edmund the Martyr: Northwood Hills (1935)
- St Edward the Confessor: Greenford (1936)
- St Etheldreda: Fulham (1897)
- St Faith [3]: Old Brentford (1901), Stepney (1906), Stoke Newington (1868)
- St Francis of Assisi [6]: Bethnal Green (1920), Holloway (1903), Isleworth (1935), Notting Hill (1936), Tottenham (2013), Willesden Green (1911)
- St Frideswide: Poplar (1880s)
- St Gabriel [6]: Acton (1923), Bounds Green (1906), Bromley-by-Bow (1873), Cricklewood (1891), London (Fenchurch) (1517), Pimlico (1851)
- St George [16]: Bayswater (1765), Bethnal Green (C16th), Bloomsbury (1731), Freezywater (1896), Hanover Square (1725), Headstone (1907), Holborn (1703), Holland Park (1864), Hornsey (1907), Mayfair (1730), Old Brentford (1762), St George-in-the-East (1729), Southall (1906), Tufnell Park (1858), Westminster (x2) (1800, 1824)
- St Giles: Enfield (1954)
- St Helen: Kensington (1884)
- St Hilda [2]: Ashford (1912), Great Cambridge Road (1926)
- St Hugh: Northolt (1954)
- St James [24]: Alperton (1896), Bethnal Green (1844), Clapton (1841), Ealing (1890), Edmonton (1839), Enfield (1831), Fulham (1868), Gunnersbury (1887), Hackney (x2) (1823, 1824), Hampstead (1882), Hampton (1863), Holloway (1838), Islington (1872), London (Duke's Place) (1622), Marylebone (1831), Muswell Hill (1842), Notting Hill (1845), Paddington (1843), Pentonville (1778), Piccadilly (1684), Ratcliff (1838), St Pancras (1791), Shoreditch (1841)
- St James the Less [2]: Bethnal Green (1842), Pimlico (1858)
- St Jerome: Dawley (1910)
- St John the Baptist [14]: Clay Hill (1858), Clerkenwell (1725), Great Cambridge Road (1939), Greenhill (1866), Hackney (x2) (1660, 1847), Hampton Wick (1829), Holland Park (1872), Hoxton (1826), Isleworth (1856), Islington (1866), St John's Wood (1814), Westminster (1865), Willesden (1901)
- St John the Evangelist [37]: Bethnal Green (1828), Bloomsbury (1721), Brownswood Park (1874), Chelsea (x2) (1873, 1880), Downshire Hill (1823), Ealing (1865), Edmonton (1884), Friern Barnet (1883), Fulham (1828), Hackney (1810), Hammersmith (1860), Hendon (1866), Highbury (1875), Holborn (1869), Holloway (1828), Isle of Dogs (1873), Islington (1879), Kensal Green (1844), Kilburn (1850s), Limehouse (1853), Notting Hill (1844), Paddington (1831), Palmers Green (1904), Pimlico (1874), St George-in-the-East (1869), St Pancras (1845), Southall (1838), Stamford Hill (1880), Uxbridge (1838), Wapping (1617), Wembley (1846), Westminster (x3) (1728, 1855, 1958), Whetstone (1832), Wood Green (1898)
- St Joseph: Northolt (1942)
- St Jude [8]: Bethnal Green (1846), Chelsea (1844), Hampstead Garden Suburb (1908), Islington (1855), Kensal Green (1879), Kensington (1870), St Pancras (1847), Whitechapel (1846)
- St Lawrence [2]: Brondesbury (1901), Eastcote (1920)
- St Luke [21]: Caledonian Road (1868), Chelsea (1824), Clay Hill (1885), Ealing (1901), Finchley (1905), Hackney (1872), Hampstead (1896), Holloway (1855), Hornsey (1898), Isleworth (1900), South Kensington (1873), Kentish Town (1856), Kilburn (1876), Marylebone (1849), Mile End (1869), Millwall (1868), Paddington (1868), St Pancras (1856), Shepherd's Bush (1872), Shoreditch (1733), Westminster (1838)
- St Mark [16]: Bush Hill Park (1885), Clerkenwell (1827), Dalston (1860), Hanwell (1879), Kensal Rise (1903), Marylebone (1872), Mayfair (1828), Noel Park (1884), Notting Hill (1864), Old Ford (1873), Regent's Park (1853), St John's Wood (1847), Shoreditch (1848), Teddington (1875), Tollington Park (1853), Whitechapel (1839)
- St Martha: Paddington (1880)
- St Martin [8]: Acton (1903), Bethnal Green (1899), Edmonton (x2) (1882, 1900), Gospel Oak (1865), Hackney (1894), Kensal Rise (1899), Twickenham (1914)
- St Mary: Bromley-by-Bow (1536), Brompton (1849), Charterhouse (1862), Dartmouth Park (1875), Edmonton (1884), Fulham (1835), Hackney (1880), Haggerston (1827), Hammersmith (1888), Hornsey (1889), Hornsey Rise (1861), Hoxton (1866), Isleworth (1931), Kenton (1927), Kilburn (1857), Marylebone (x2) (1817, 1823), Mayfair (1880), Osterley (1855), Pimlico (1874), Primrose Hill (1867), Ruislip (1931), St George-in-the-East (1850), Soho (1850), Somers Town (1824), Spitalfields (1854), Stoke Newington (1858), Tottenham (1884), Westminster (1836)
- St Mary Magdalene: Chiswick (1848), Enfield (1883), Hendon (1934), Islington (1814), Paddington (1865), Regent's Park (1852)
- St Matthew: Ashford (1856), Bayswater (1858), Bethnal Green (1743), Camden Town (1854), Chelsea (1874), Clapton (1862), Ealing (1872), Finsbury (1848), Fulham (1895), Hammersmith (1872), Islington (1836), Maida Vale (1853), Muswell Hill (1926), Ponders End (1878), St George-in-the-East (1859), Stepney (1872), Westminster (1849), Willesden (1894), Yiewsley (1859)
- St Matthias: Bethnal Green (1847), Caledonian Road (1886), Colindale (1905), Earl's Court (1871), Poplar (1857), Stoke Newington (1853)
- St Mellitus: Hanwell (1910)
- St Michael: Bedford Park (1876), Bowes Park (1874), Bromley-by-Bow (1867), Camden Town (1877), Chiswick (1907), Cricklewood (1910), Edmonton (1901), Golders Green (1910), Gordon Hill (1874), Harrow Weald (1935), Islington (1853), Ladbroke Grove (1870), London Fields (1864), Mill Hill (1909), Paddington (1864), Stoke Newington (1882), Shoreditch (1862), Stonebridge (1876), Tokyngton (1926), Westminster (x2) (1834, 1846), Wood Green (1843)
- SS Michael & George: Fulwell (1913), White City (1953)
- St Nicholas: Hayes (1937), Perivale (1934), Poplar (1955)
- St Olaf: Mile End (1875), Woodberry Down (1894)
- St Oswald: Fulham (1893)
- St Padarn: Islington (1903)
- St Pancras: St Pancras (1819)
- St Paul [40]: Bethnal Green (1864), Bow Common (1858), Brompton (1860), Burnt Oak (1904), Camden Town (1849), Chiswick (1870), Clerkenwell (x2) (1875, 1875), Covent Garden (1631), Ealing (1907), Finchley (1885), Finsbury (1839), Hackney (1960), Hadley Wood (1900), Haggerston (1860), Hammersmith (1630), Hampstead (1859), Harringay (1883), Harrow (1928), Homerton (1885), Hounslow (1873), Islington (x2) (1828, 1870), Kilburn (1825), Knightsbridge (1841), Marylebone (x3) (1831, 1831, 1838), Mill Hill (1833), New Southgate (1870), Old Brentford (1861), Old Ford (1878), Paddington (1874), Ruislip (1937), St George-in-the-East (1825), Shadwell (1656), Tottenham (1855), Twickenham (1937), Willesden (1934), Winchmore Hill (1828)
- St Peter [39]: Acton (1906), Belsize Park (1859), Bethnal Green (1841), Bounds Green (1883), Camden Town (1832), Canary Wharf (2004), Clerkenwell (1871), Cricklewood (x2) (1882, 1958), Dartmouth Park (1874), De Beauvoir Town (1841), Ealing (1882), Edgware (1962), Edmonton (1896), Fulham (1883), Grange Park (1920s), Hammersmith (1829), Harringay (1884), Harrow (1907), Hornsey (1898), Hoxton (1869), Islington (1835), Kensal Rise (pre-1966), Kensington (1867), Limehouse (1884), London Docks (1856), Marylebone (1832), Muswell Hill (1866), Notting Hill (1855), Paddington (1871), Pimlico (1827), St Pancras (1826), Soho (1861), Staines (1873), Stepney (1839), Stonebridge (1902), Tottenham (1883), Uxbridge (1906), Westminster (1770)
- SS Peter & Paul: Enfield (1928), Teddington (1865)
- St Philip the Apostle: Bethnal Green (1842), Clerkenwell (1832), Dalston (1840), Earl's Court (1858), Mile End (1819), Paddington (1861), Tottenham (1899), Westminster (x2) (1822, 1890)
- St Philip the Evangelist: Islington (1855)
- SS Philip (the Apostle) & James (the Less): Whitton (1862)
- St Raphael: Neasden (1924)
- St Richard of Chichester: Hanworth (1965), Northolt (1960)
- St Saviour / Holy Saviour / Christ the Saviour: Acton (1873), Alexandra Park (1904), Chelsea (1840), Ealing (x2) (1899, 1952), Edmonton (1902), Hammersmith (1880), Hampstead (1847), Heathrow (1880), Highbury (1866), Hoxton (1861), Islington (1866), Paddington (1855), Pimlico (1863), Poplar (1874), St Pancras (1863), Sunbury (1872), Tollington Park (1888)
- St Silas: Kentish Town (1877), Pentonville (1863)
- St Simon: Bethnal Green (1846), Chelsea (1859), Paddington (1899), Shepherd's Bush (1880)
- St Stephen: Bush Hill Park (1901), Canonbury (1839), Ealing (1867), Haggerston (1865), Hampstead (x2) (1849, 1869), Hounslow (1872), Islington (1877), South Kensington (1866), Old Ford (1827), Pentonville (1838), Poplar (1867), St John's Wood (1848), Shepherd's Bush (1850), Spitalfields (1858), Twickenham (1874), Westbourne Park (1856), Westminster (1850)
- St Thomas: Acton (1915), Barnsbury (1860), Bethnal Green (1844), Camden Town (1864), Charterhouse (1842), Clapton (1828), Finsbury Park (1880), Hanwell (1907), Kensal Town (1889), Marylebone (1858), Oakwood (1906), Shepherd's Bush (pre-1960), Stepney (1840), Westminster (1869)
- No dedication: Acton (2000), Bethnal Green (1814), Euston (2010), Grosvenor Chapel (1730), Hackney (1760), Homerton (1740s), Islington (1994), King's Cross (2010), Limehouse Docks (1825), Marylebone (x6) (1722, C18th, 1764, 1760s, 1779, 1796), Northwood (x2) (C20th, 1995), St Pancras (1788), Southgate (1615), Twickenham (1727), Westminster (x4) (1642, 1688, 1760s, 1824)

== Extra-parochial places ==
- Glasshouse Yard (population 625)
- Westminster Abbey (population 249)
- Charterhouse (population 122)
- Tower of London (population 68)
- Gray's Inn (population 48)
- Lincoln's Inn (population 48)
- St Paul's Cathedral (population 0)

== Benefices by population ==
Benefice	Population	Churches	Clergy (Dec 2025)
London St Giles Cripplegate	7,607	1	1 Rector, 1 Curate, 1 NSM
London St Bartholomew the Great	744	2	1 Rector, 1 Curate
London St Botolph without Aldgate	694	1	1 Vicar
London St Bride Fleet Street	619	1	1 Rector, 2 NSMs
London All Hallows by the Tower // St Mary at Hill	360	2	1 Joint Rector/Vicar, 1 Curate, 1 Hon. Curate
London St James Garlickhythe // St Dunstan in the West	330	2	1 Joint Rector/Priest-in-Charge
London St Andrew by the Wardrobe with St Martin Ludgate	290	3	1 Rector/Archdeacon, 2 Curates
(Westminster Abbey)	(249)	(2)	
London St Botolph without Bishopsgate	201	1	1 Rector
(Tower of London)	(68)	(2)	(1 Chaplain, 1 Assistant Priest)
London St Edmund the King, St Mary Woolnoth, St Clement Eastcheap	36	3	Vacant, 1 Curate
London St Helen Bishopsgate	36	2	1 Rector, 4 Curates, 1 NSM
London St Magnus the Martyr	12	1	1 Rector
(St Paul's Cathedral)	(0)	(1)	
London All Hallows London Wall	N/A (G.C.)	1	1 Priest-in-Charge
London St Andrew Holborn	N/A (G.C.)	1	Vacant (since 2014), 1 Curate
London St Benet Paul's Wharf	N/A (G.C.)	1	1 Priest-in-Charge (also Curate at St Helen's)
London St Botolph without Aldersgate	N/A (G.C.)	1	1 Vicar, 1 NSM
London St Margaret Pattens	N/A (G.C.)	1	1 Vicar

== Resources and external links ==
- Diocesan website
- Ecclesiastical parishes in Middlesex
- Deaneries and churches in 1903
- Middlesex parishes with links to churches
- Middlesex parishes on FamilySearch
- Victoria County History of Middlesex
- London, Westminster and Middlesex Family History Society
- List of places of worship in London, 1804 (1738)
