= St Alphege Church, Edmonton =

Church in Edmonton, London, England

Coordinates: 51.6389°N 0.0489°W

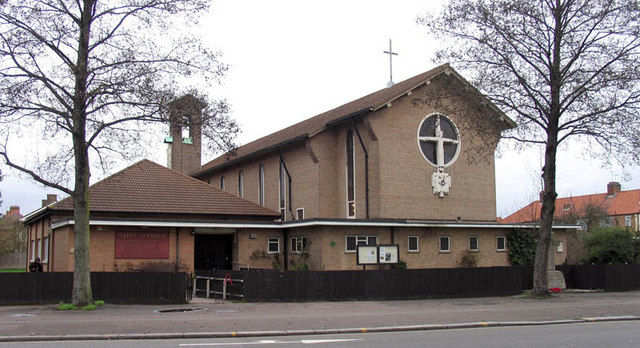
St Alphege Church

St Alphege Church is a grade II listed church in Edmonton, London. It was designed by Edward Maufe in a modern Swedish Gothic style and opened in the 1950s.
