= All Saints' Hampton =

- All Saints' church, Hampton (, Middlesex before 1965, Greater London after 1965)
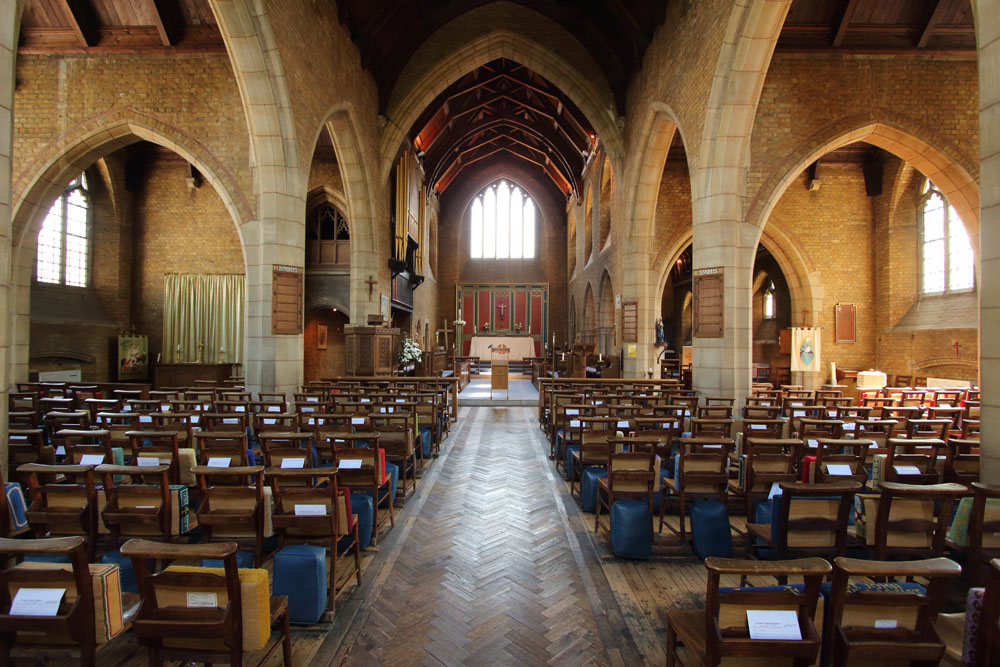
- Great stone vaulted arches dominate the church's interior
- All Saints' Hampton
- 51.4243°N 0.37662°W
- Location: Hampton, London
- Country: England
- Denomination: Anglican
- Website: allsaintshampton.co.uk

History
- Status: Parish church
- Dedication: All the saints

Architecture
- Functional status: Active
- Style: Simplified (Edwardian) gothic

Specifications
- Materials: Stock brick and tiles with stone dressings throughout, light brick over-arches and fully timber-framed roof

Administration
- Province: Canterbury
- Diocese: Diocese of London
- Archdeaconry: Middlesex
- Deanery: Hampton
- Parish: All Saints, Hampton

Clergy
- Archbishop: The Most Rev. the Archbishop of Canterbury
- Bishop(s): The Rt Revd & Rt Hon the Bishop of London: Sarah Mullally; The Rt Revd the Bishop of Kensington: Emma Ineson
- Vicar: Revd Donna Williams

All Saints' Hampton is an Anglican church on The Avenue in Hampton in the London Borough of Richmond upon Thames. It was built in 1908 as part of the parish of St Mary's, Hampton and it has been a parish church since 1929. Its vicar is Rev. Donna Williams.
