= Christ Church, Mayfair =

Church in Mayfair, London

Coordinates: 51.5052°N 0.1487°W

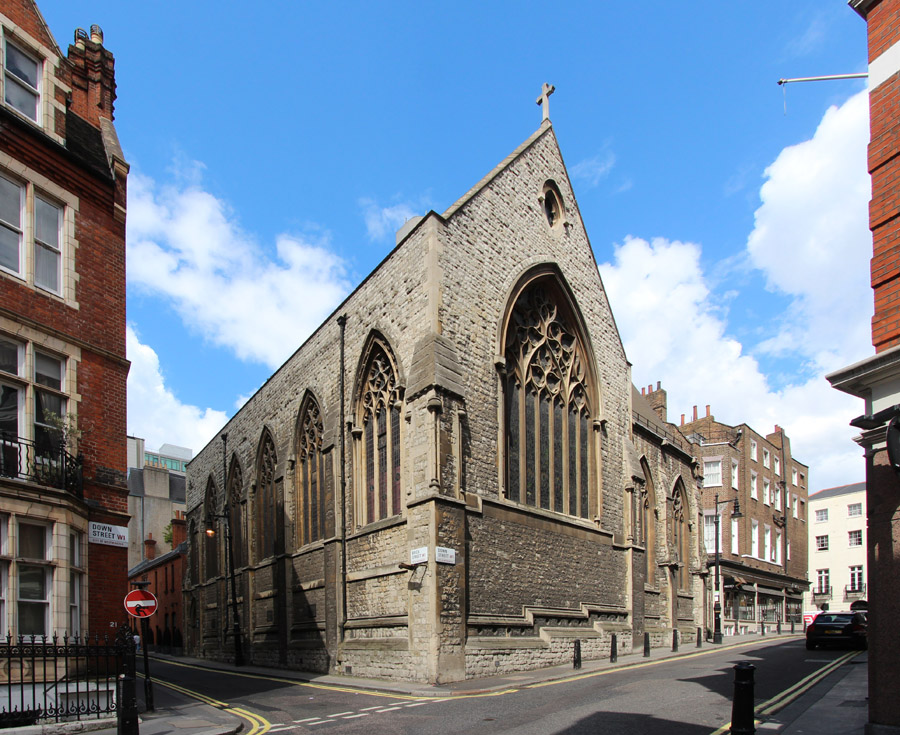
Christ Church, Mayfair

Christ Church Mayfair is a church in Mayfair in the Grade II listed building previously occupied by Christ Church, Down Street.

The church was designed by F. & H. Francis and built around 1865. It is built in a Gothic style, particularly Decorated Gothic, in rag-stone. Its timber barrel-vaulted roof is of particular interest. It was damaged by a fire in 1906 with restoration work being carried out R. L. Hesketh. In the 1990s, the church closed for worship but was in 2004 reopened under its current name.
