= St James Church Alperton =

Coordinates: 51.5428°N 0.2937°W

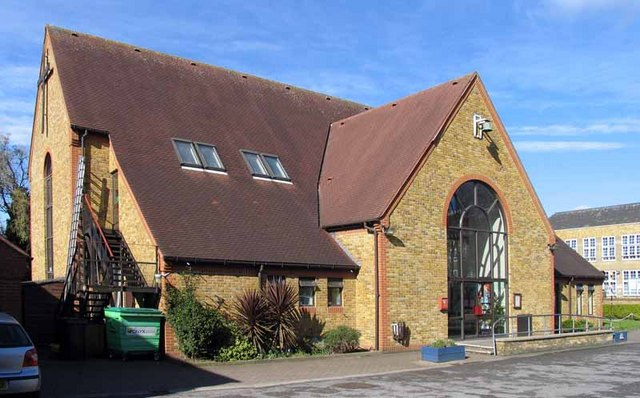
Building

St James Church Alperton was originally a Gothic Revival Anglican Parish church, built in Alperton in the London Borough of Brent in London. It is situated on Stanley Avenue in the London Borough of Brent.

Consecrated in 1912, the original church building was declared to be a redundant church on the February 7, 1989, and was subsequently demolished in 1990 to make way for a replacement modern church, St James Church Centre.

== Foundation ==
The church was built to replace temporary previous arrangements, which had included a missionary's tent, and at one point, a church made out of corrugated iron from 1896. A chapel belonging to the Baptists had been in place since 1828, but Alperton was not made an Anglican parish in its own right until 1904, and had previously been served by St John the Evangelist Church, Wembley. However, the process was not entirely smooth, and there was an ongoing boundary dispute between the two parishes which continued from 1911 to 1954.

== Construction ==
By the early 20th century, a movement of population from the Wealdstone area had made the construction of a more lasting structure a necessity, which was designed by the architect William Pite, brother of Arthur Beresford Pite in the Gothic Revival style. The church was described as being constructed from yellow stock brick, with a dressing of stone and red brick. The church featured the customary main body of the nave and chancel, a transept on the south end of the building, and, in addition, a baptistery in the north west, a chapel in the north east, and a porch – the narthex. St James Church also had its own bell tower which was described as a ‘turret’. There was also an associated church hall as early as 1914. The church's organ was donated, coming from St Peter's Italian Church, in Clerkenwell, central London, and was originally gas lit. It was later updated to include a boiler room, and the organ was later replaced, probably by 1929, by another donated item, described as coming from Saint Mark's, Whitechapel in the late 1920s. At a later stage, a Compton Electronic organ was installed – an electric lighting system was in place by 1930. The church also had stained windows, some of which were in place as memorials to prominent members of the congregation.

== Redundancy and demolition ==
By 1989, the now redundant church had been scheduled for demolition, and the London Diocese Fund had earmarked part of the site for a new place of worship, with the remainder to go, by sale or lease, to Bellway homes for redevelopment under Section 46 (Pastoral Scheme), which deals with places of worship that are unsuitable for present needs, and specifies how, when part of a site is sold or leased, the proceeds can then be used to create a new place of worship.

== A new place of worship ==
In 1990, a new church, St James Alperton Church Centre, had been constructed on the site, designed by the K C White Partnership of Essex. The new church's mission statement describes it as a multilingual place of worship, and offers services in Tamil, Urdu and Hindi.
