= St Michael & All Angels, Enfield =

Church in Enfield, London, England

Coordinates: 51.6611°N 0.0873°W

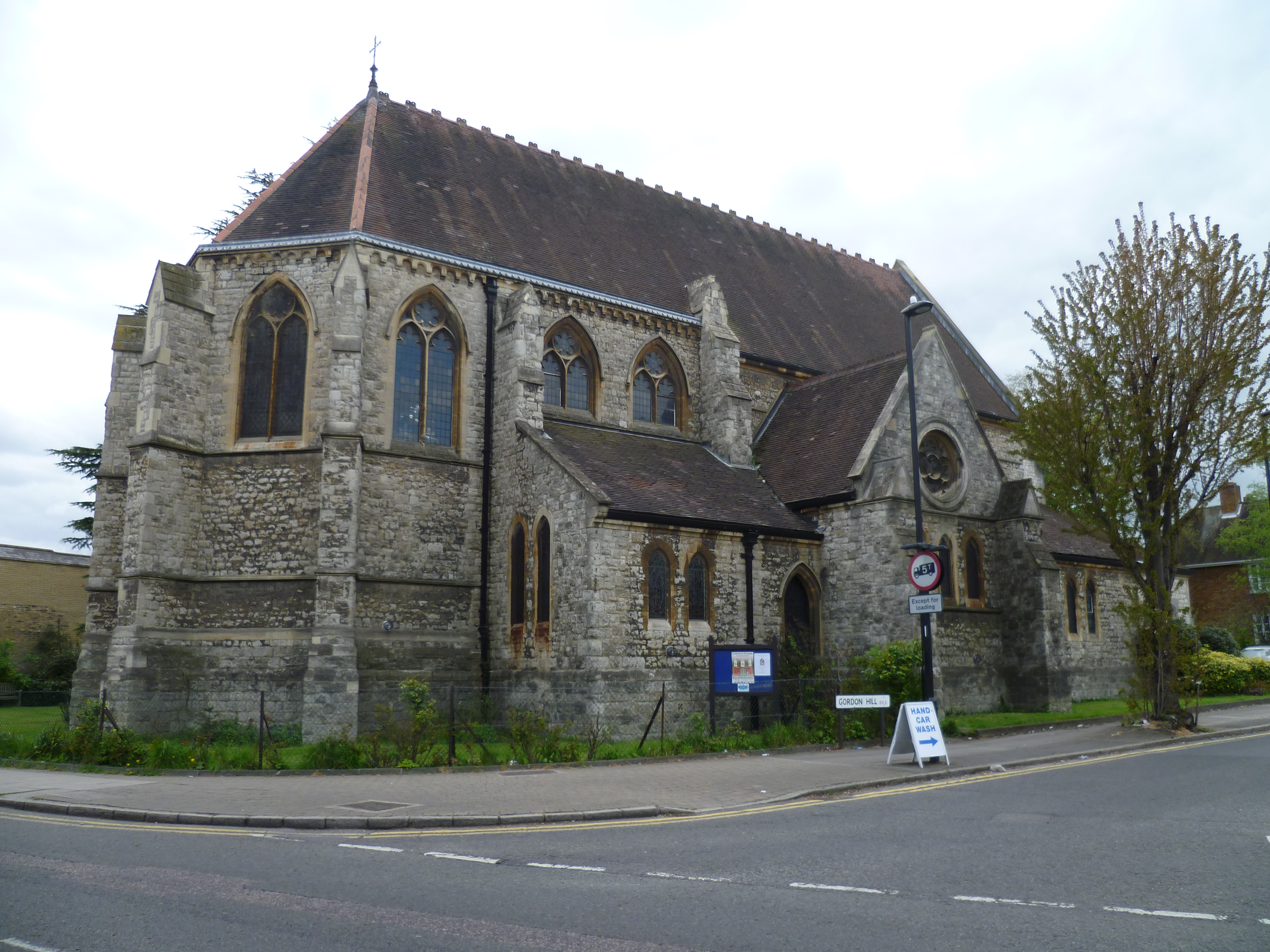
St Michael and All Angels church

St Michael and All Angels is a grade II listed Church of England church at Chase Side, Enfield, London.

Designed by Richard Herbert Carpenter in an imitation of a 14th-century Gothic style, the church was begun in 1873 as a chapel of ease to the parish church of St Andrew. The following year a shortage of funds brought construction to a halt, and the west end was closed off with a temporary wall. Built of ragstone, the church consists of a three-bay aisled nave, a north transept, and a vaulted apsidal chancel, arranged in a manner advocated by the Tractarian Movement. The temporary wall was finally replaced with a stone wall and a narthex in 1963.

A parish was formed in 1931.
