= Worshipful Company of Parish Clerks =

Guild of the City of London

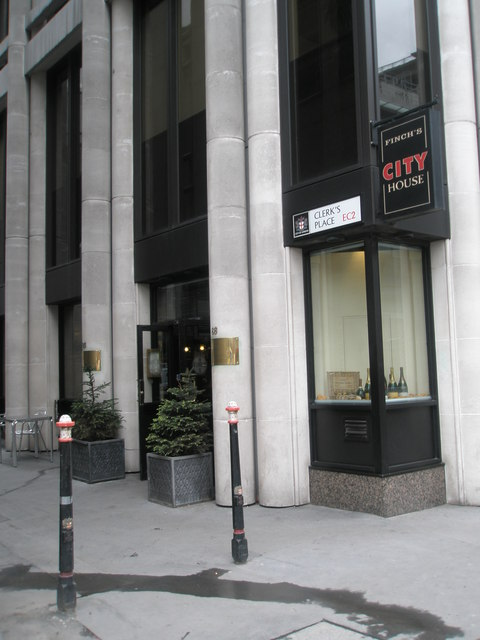
Clerk's Place off Bishopsgate, described by Tudor London historian John Stow in his 1598 Survey of London as the entry to the common hall of the parish clerks.

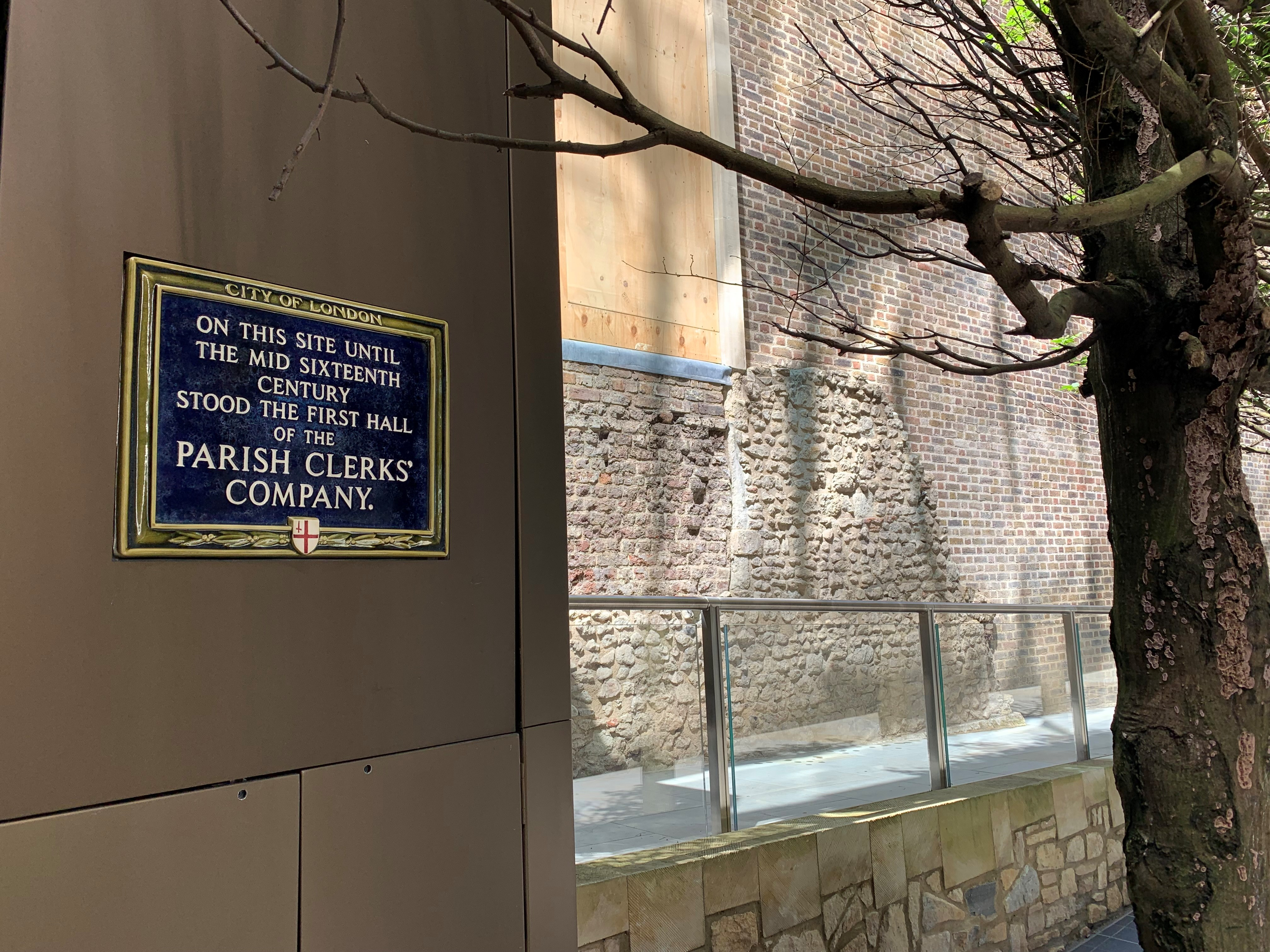
Site of the first hall of the Worshipful Company of Parish Clerks, demolished 1553

The Worshipful Company of Parish Clerks is one of the Guilds of the City of London. It has no livery, because "in the 16th century, the Parish Clerks declined to take the Livery on the grounds that the surplice was older than the Livery and was the proper garb of members of the Company." It is not, therefore, technically a livery company although to all intents and purposes it acts as such. It is one of two such historic companies without livery, the other being the Company of Watermen and Lightermen.

Although they have no place in the order of precedence, which governs only liveried companies, The Master, Wardens, Assistants and Brethren of the Parish Clerks of the Parish Churches of the City and Suburbs of London and the Liberties thereof, the City of Westminster, the borough of Southwark and the fifteen Out-Parishes adjacent, are among the oldest City companies. Individual members held property on behalf of the Fraternity near Bishopsgate in 1274. The Company was incorporated by Letters Patent on 22 January 1441/2. Later Royal Charters, granted by Charles I, dated February 1635/6 and February 1638/9, are kept in the Guildhall Library.

== Parishes ==
The number of parishes at the time of the 1639 charter was 129, of which 108 were in the City of London. A further twenty one parishes in Middlesex and Surrey within the bills of mortality were added between 1639 and 1825. The Company's 150 parishes are listed below.

=== Churches included in the Charter of 1639 ===
==== In the City of London ====
All Hallows Barking (Berkyngechurche), All Hallows Bread Street, All Hallows the Great, All Hallows Honey Lane, All Hallows the Less, All Hallows Lombard Street, All Hallows London Wall, All Hallows Staining, Christ Church Newgate Street, Holy Trinity the Less, St Alban, Wood Street, St Alphage London Wall, St Andrew by the Wardrobe, St Andrew Holborn, St Andrew Hubbard, St Andrew Undershaft, St Ann Blackfriars, St Anne and St Agnes, St Antholin, St Augustine Watling Street, St Bartholomew by the Exchange, St Bartholomew the Great, St Bartholomew the Less, St Benet Fink, St Benet Gracechurch, St Benet Paul's Wharf, St Benet Sherehog, St Botolph by Billingsgate, St Botolph without Aldersgate, St Botolph without Aldgate, St Botolph without Bishopsgate, St Bride, St Christopher le Stocks, St Clement Eastcheap, St Dionis Backchurch, St Dunstan in the East, St Dunstan in the West, St Edmund, King and Martyr, St Ethelburga, St Faith under St Paul's, St Gabriel Fenchurch, St George Botolph Lane, St Giles-without-Cripplegate, St Gregory by St Paul's, St Helen Bishopsgate, St James Duke's Place, St James Garlickhithe, St John the Baptist Walbrook, St John the Evangelist Friday Street, St John Zachary, St Katherine Coleman, St Katherine Cree, St Lawrence Jewry, St Lawrence Pountney, St Leonard Eastcheap, St Leonard Foster Lane, St Magnus the Martyr, St Margaret Lothbury, St Margaret Moses, St Margaret, New Fish Street, St Margaret Pattens, St Martin Ludgate, St Martin Orgar, St Martin Outwich, St Martin Pomeroy, St Martin Vintry, St Mary Abchurch, St Mary Aldermanbury, St Mary Aldermary, St Mary-at-Hill, St Mary Bothaw, St Mary le Bow, St Mary Colechurch, St. Mary Magdalen, Milk Street, St Mary Magdalen Old Fish Street, St Mary Mounthaw, St Mary Somerset, St Mary Staining, St Mary Woolchurch, St Mary Woolnoth, St Matthew Friday Street, St Michael Bassishaw, St Michael Cornhill, St Michael Crooked Lane, St Michael Queenhithe, St Michael le Querne, St Michael Paternoster Royal, St Michael Wood Street, St Mildred Bread Street, St Mildred Poultry, St Nicholas Acons, St Nicholas Cole Abbey, St Nicholas Olave, St Olave Hart Street, St Olave Old Jewry, St Olave Silver Street, St Pancras Soper Lane, St Peter Cornhill, St Peter Paul's Wharf, St Peter le Poer, St Peter Westcheap, St Sepulchre, St Stephen Coleman Street, St Stephen Walbrook, St Swithin London Stone, St Thomas Apostle, St Vedast Foster Lane, Bridewell Precinct (extra-parochial place)

==== In the Liberties of the Tower of London ====
Holy Trinity Minories

==== In the City of Westminster ====
St Margaret Westminster

==== In the Borough of Southwark ====
St George Southwark, St Olave Southwark, St Saviour Southwark, St Thomas Southwark

==== Out-parishes in Middlesex ====
St Clement Danes, St Martin in the Fields, St John Baptist Savoy, St Giles in the Fields, St James Clerkenwell, St Leonard Shoreditch, St Mary Whitechapel, St Dunstan Stepney, St John at Hackney, St Mary Islington, St Katharine by the Tower (Liberty)

==== Out-parishes in Surrey ====
St Mary Magdalen Bermondsey, St Mary Lambeth, St Mary Newington, St Mary Rotherhithe

=== Additional parishes within the 'bills' of which the parish clerk may be admitted to membership of the Company ===
St Alban the Martyr, Holborn St Peter ad Vincula (Tower of London), St Anne Soho, St Chad Haggerston, St Clement King Square, St George Hanover Square, Holy Redeemer, Clerkenwell Holy Trinity, Hoxton St James Piccadilly, St John Westminster, St Mary le Strand, St Paul Covent Garden, Christ Church Southwark, St John Horsleydown, All Saints Poplar, Christ Church Spitalfields, St Anne Limehouse, St George Bloomsbury, St George in the East, St George the Martyr Queen Square, St John Clerkenwell, St John Wapping, St John Waterloo St Luke Old Street, St Mark, Clerkenwell St Matthew Bethnal Green, St Matthew, Westminster St Paul Shadwell, St Peter London Docks St Stephen, Westminster St Paul, West Hackney

== Coat of arms ==
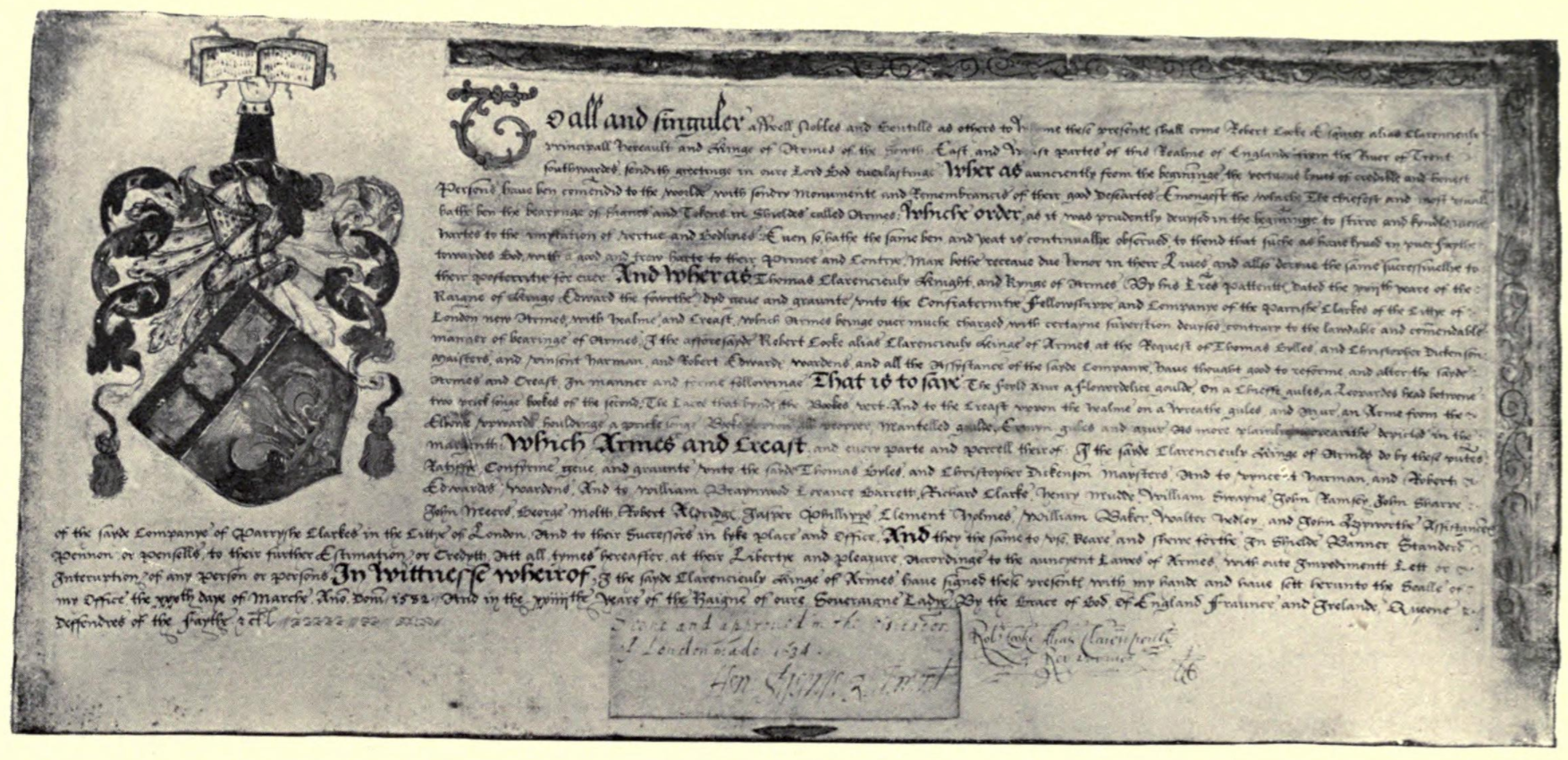
Second grant of arms of 1582

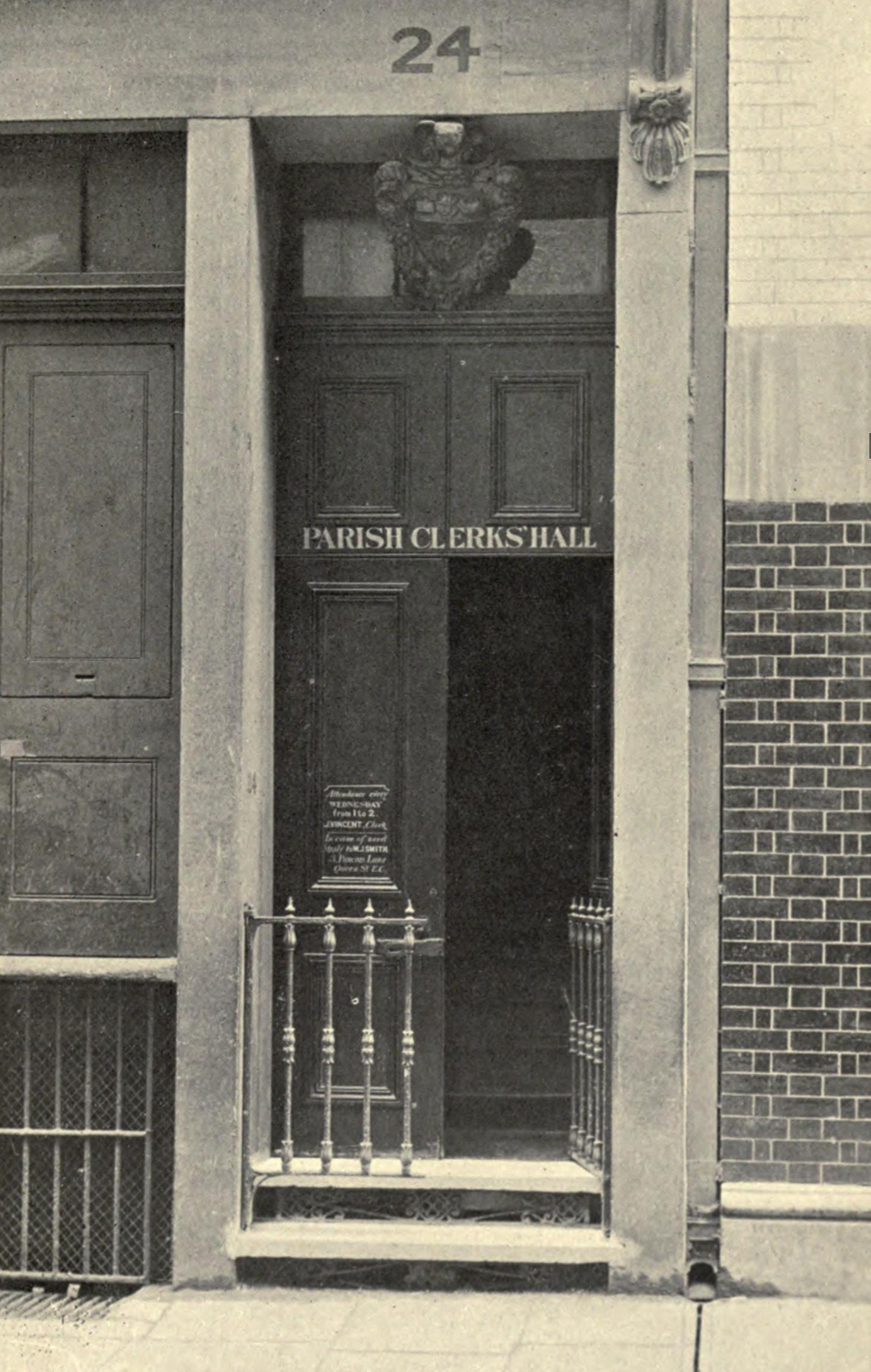
The Company's third hall at 24 Silver Street 1671-1940

The Company was first granted arms on 16 July 1482. The second grant was made in 1582; these were replaced by a new grant on 16 October 1991, which granted supporters in addition to the previous arms, blazoned as follows:

Arms

Azure a Fleur de lys or, on a chief gules a leopard's head Or between two 'pricksong books' of the same laced vert.

Supporters

On either side and standing to the front on the capital of an Ionic Column Or and Angel gazing outwards proper winged Or vested of a tunic Argent garnished Or draped over the interior shoulder with a mantle Azure and holding with the interior hand a Trumpet baldrick-wise the bell upwards all gold.

Crest

On a wreath gules and Azure, a cubit arm vested Azure cuffed ermine holding an open 'pricksong' book all proper.

Motto

"Unitas societatis stabilitas"
