= Ralph Robinson =

Ralph Robinson may refer to:

- Ralph Robinson (humanist) of the sixteenth century
- Ralph Robinson (priest) of the seventeenth century
- King George III of the United Kingdom (1738-1820), who wrote pseudonymous agricultural papers under this name
