= List of demolished churches in the City of London =

This is a list of churches in the City of London which were rebuilt after the Great Fire of London (or in a later date) but have been demolished since then. All were designed by Sir Christopher Wren except All Hallows Staining, Holy Trinity Gough Square, St Alphege London Wall, St James Duke's Place, St Katherine Coleman, St Martin Outwich, St Peter le Poer and the non-Anglican churches and chapels.

Sometimes there is still some sign that a place of worship was once there. Parish register details were often transferred to the subsuming parish.

== Completely demolished ==
Image	Church name	Location	Rebuilt	Date of demolition	Subsuming parish
	All Hallows Bread Street	Bread Street	1681-98	1878	St Mary-le-Bow
	All Hallows Lombard Street	Lombard Street	1686-94	1939	St Edmund the King and Martyr
	All-Hallows-the-Great	Upper Thames Street	1677-84	1894	St. Michael Paternoster Royal
	Holy Trinity Gough Square	Great New Street	1838	1906	St Bride's Church
	St Alphege London Wall	London Wall	1774-77	1923	St Mary Aldermanbury
	St Antholin, Budge Row	Watling Street	1678-84	1875	St Mary Aldermary
	St Bartholomew-by-the-Exchange	Bartholomew Lane	1675-83	1840	St Margaret Lothbury
	St Benet Fink	Threadneedle Street	1670-75	1846	St Peter le Poer
	St Benet Gracechurch	Gracechurch Street	1681-87	1868	All Hallows Lombard Street
	St Christopher le Stocks	Threadneedle Street	1670-71	1782	St Margaret Lothbury
	St Dionis Backchurch	Fenchurch Street	1670-77	1878	All Hallows Lombard Street
	St George Botolph Lane	Botolph Lane	1671-76	1904	St Mary-at-Hill
	St James Duke's Place	Mitre Square	1727	1874	St Katharine Cree
	St Katherine Coleman	Church Row	1740	1926	St Olave Hart Street
	St Martin Outwich	Threadneedle Street	1798	1874	St Helen's Bishopsgate
	St Mary Aldermanbury	Aldermanbury	1670-74	1940/1964	St Giles Cripplegate
	St Mary Magdalen Old Fish Street	Old Change	1683-87	1893	St Martin, Ludgate
	St Matthew Friday Street	Friday Street	1682-85	1885	St Vedast alias Foster
	St Michael Bassishaw	Basinghall Street	1675-79	1900	St Lawrence Jewry
	St Michael, Crooked Lane	Miles's Lane	1687	1831	St Magnus the Martyr
	St Michael Queenhithe	Upper Thames Street	1676-86	1876	St James Garlickhythe
	St Michael Wood Street	Wood Street	1670-75	1897	St Alban Wood Street
	St Mildred, Bread Street	Bread Street	1677-83	1941	St Mary-le-Bow
	St Mildred, Poultry	Poultry	1670-77	1872	St Olave Old Jewry
	St Peter le Poer	Old Broad Street	1788-92	1907	St Michael, Cornhill
	St Stephen Coleman Street	Coleman Street	1677	1940	St Margaret Lothbury
	St Swithin, London Stone	Cannon Street	1678	1940/1962	St Stephen Walbrook

== Tower remains ==
Image	Church name	Location	Rebuilt	Date of demolition	Subsuming parish
	All Hallows Staining	Mark Lane	1674	1870	St Olave Hart Street
	Christ Church Greyfriars	Newgate Street	1677-91	1940	St Sepulchre-without-Newgate
	St Alban, Wood Street	Wood Street	1682-87	1940	St Vedast Foster Lane
	St Augustine Watling Street	Watling Street	1680-87	1941	St Mary-le-Bow
	St Dunstan-in-the-East	St Dunstan's Hill	1698	1941	All Hallows by the Tower
	St Mary Somerset	Upper Thames Street	1686-94	1871	St Nicholas Cole Abbey
	St Olave Old Jewry	Old Jewry	1670-79	1887	St Margaret Lothbury

== Other denominations ==
Image	Church name	Location	Built	Date of demolition	Denomination
	Albion Chapel	Finsbury Pavement	1816	1875	Scottish Presbyterian chapel
	Finsbury Chapel	East Street	1825	1891	Congregational chapel
	French Protestant Church	St Martin's Le Grand	1843	1888	French Protestant (Huguenot) church
	Gracechurch Street Meeting House	Gracechurch Street	1668	1821	Meeting house of the Religious Society of Friends (Quakers)
	South Place Chapel	South Place	1824	1927	Unitarian chapel
	St Martin Orgar	Martin Lane		1820	French Protestant (Huguenot) chapel
	St Mary Moorfields	Blomfield Street	1820	1899	Roman Catholic pro-cathedral

== See also ==
- List of churches destroyed in the Great Fire of London and not rebuilt
- List of Christopher Wren churches in London

General:

- List of demolished buildings and structures in London

== Bibliography ==
- Betjeman, John (1992) [1967], Sovereign City of London Churches, Andover: Pitkin, ISBN 0-85372-565-9
- Huelin, G (1996), Vanished Churches of the City of London, London: Guildhall Library Publications, ISBN 0-900422-42-4
- Reynolds, H (1922), The Churches of the City of London, London: The Bodley Head Limited
