= St Mary Woolnoth =

Coordinates: 51°30′46.01″N 0°5′17.19″W

- Saint Mary Woolnoth of the Nativity
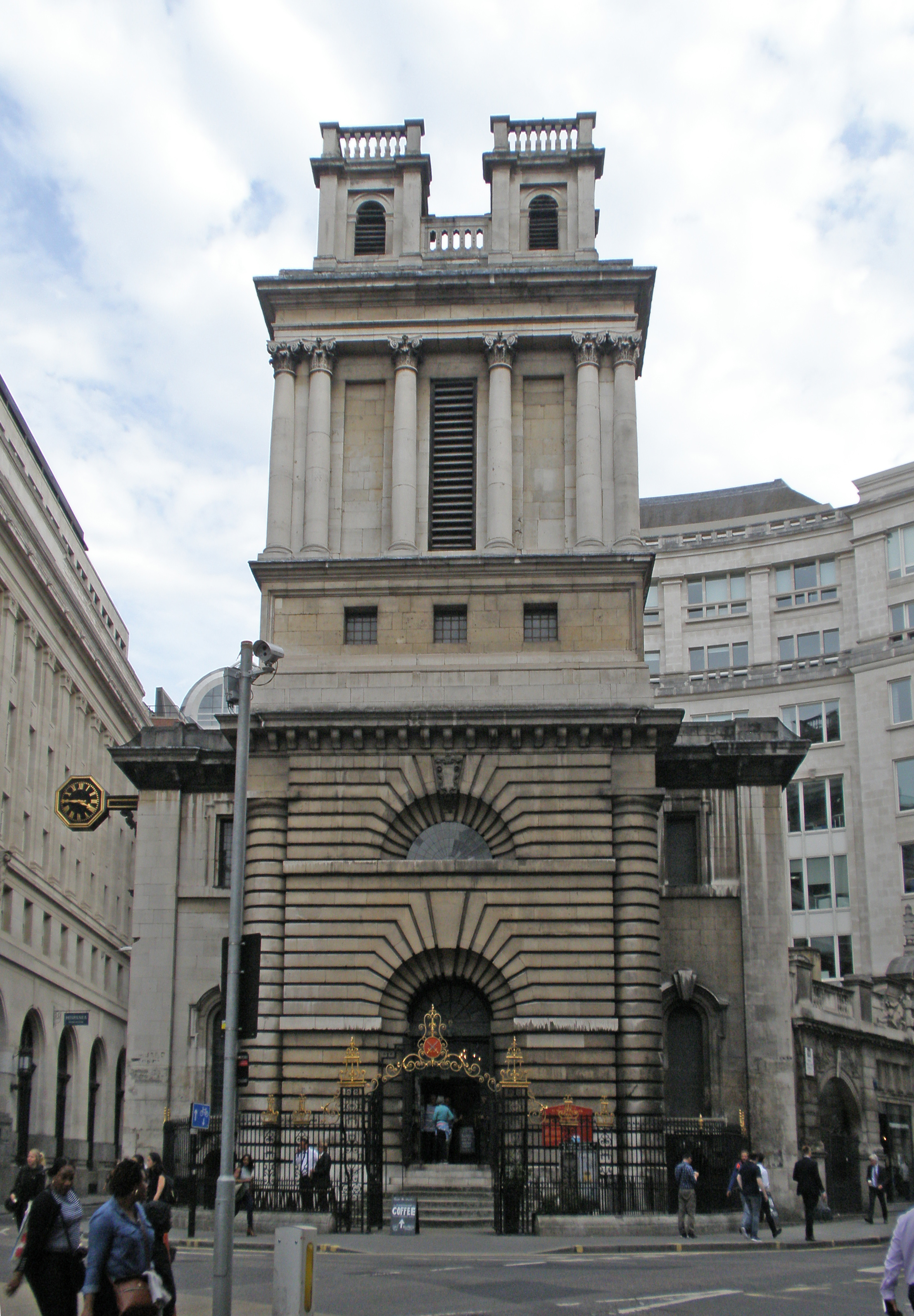
- The view from the Bank end of Lombard Street (2017)

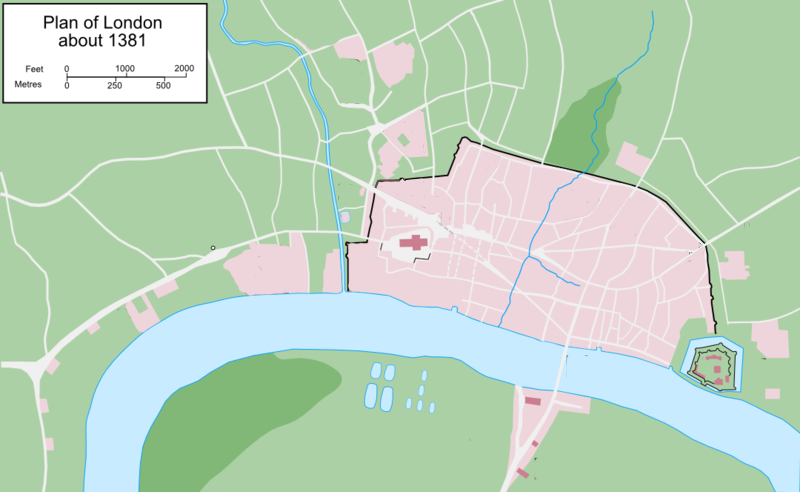
- Location within City of London Location within City of London in 1300
- Location: 10–13 Lombard Street, City of London, EC3
- Country: England
- Language: English
- Denomination: Church of England
- Previous denomination: Roman Catholic (to 1538)
- Website: lombardchurches.org

History
- Founded: 12th century
- Founder: Possibly Wulnoth de Walebrok or Wulfnoth Cild
- Dedication: Mary (as "Mary of the Nativity")

Architecture
- Functional status: Regular worship
- Heritage designation: Grade I
- Designated: 1950
- Architect: Nicholas Hawksmoor
- Style: English Baroque
- Groundbreaking: 1716
- Completed: 1727

Administration
- Diocese: London
- Archdeaconry: London
- Deanery: City of London
- Parish: Lombard Churches

Clergy
- Rector: Jeremy Crossley

St Mary Woolnoth is an Anglican church in the City of London, located on the corner of Lombard Street and King William Street near Bank junction. The present building is one of the Queen Anne Churches, designed by Nicholas Hawksmoor. The parish church continues to be used for services. St Mary Woolnoth lies in the ward of Langbourn.

== History ==
=== Early history ===
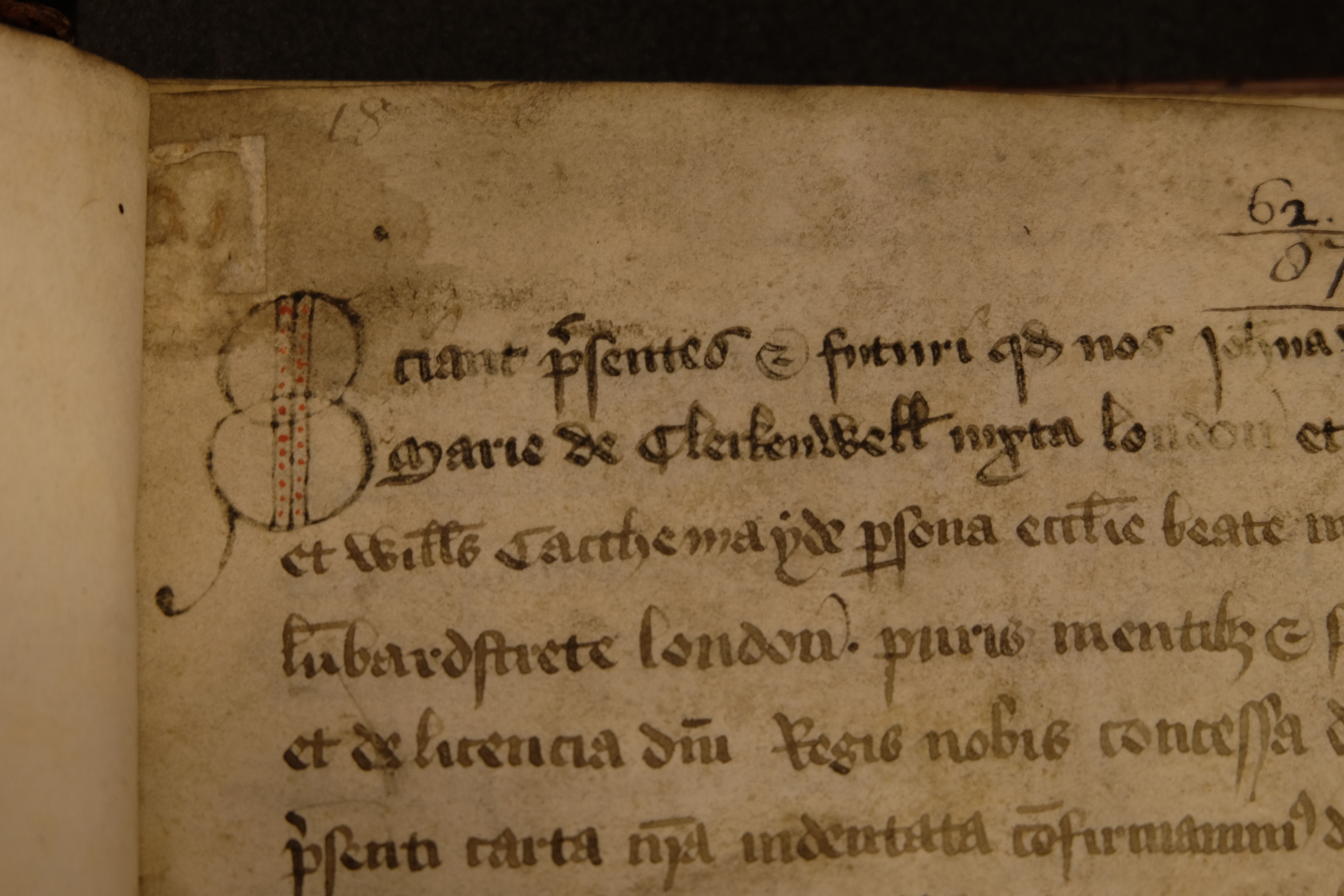
Register of St Mary's Woolnoth (15th century)

Roman remains were found under the site during the rebuilding by Hawksmoor, and there is speculation that there was a large Roman building in the immediate vicinity. This has led some to believe that the site has been used for worship for at least 2,000 years. This is based on the guess that the Roman remains were of a religious nature, and 'under the remains of an Anglo-Saxon wooden structure'. However, its name is first recorded in 1191 as Wilnotmaricherche.

It is believed that the name "Woolnoth" refers to a benefactor, possibly one Wulnoth de Walebrok who is known to have lived in the area earlier in the 12th century, or perhaps Wulfnoth Cild (d. c. 1014), a South Saxon nobleman and grandfather of King Harold Godwinson. Its full (and unusual) dedication is to Saint Mary of the Nativity.

The present building is at least the third church on the site. The Norman church survived until 1445, when it was rebuilt, with a spire added in 1485. It was badly damaged in 1666 in the Great Fire of London but was repaired by Sir Christopher Wren. Two new bells (the treble and the tenor) were cast in 1670, and in 1672 the middle bell was cast. The patched-up structure proved unsafe, however, and had to be demolished in 1711.

The parish registers include records of the baptism of two men of African origin in the early 17th-century, Andrew Blackmore in 1629, and Timothy, described as a "heathen blackamoore" in 1629.

=== Hawksmoor ===
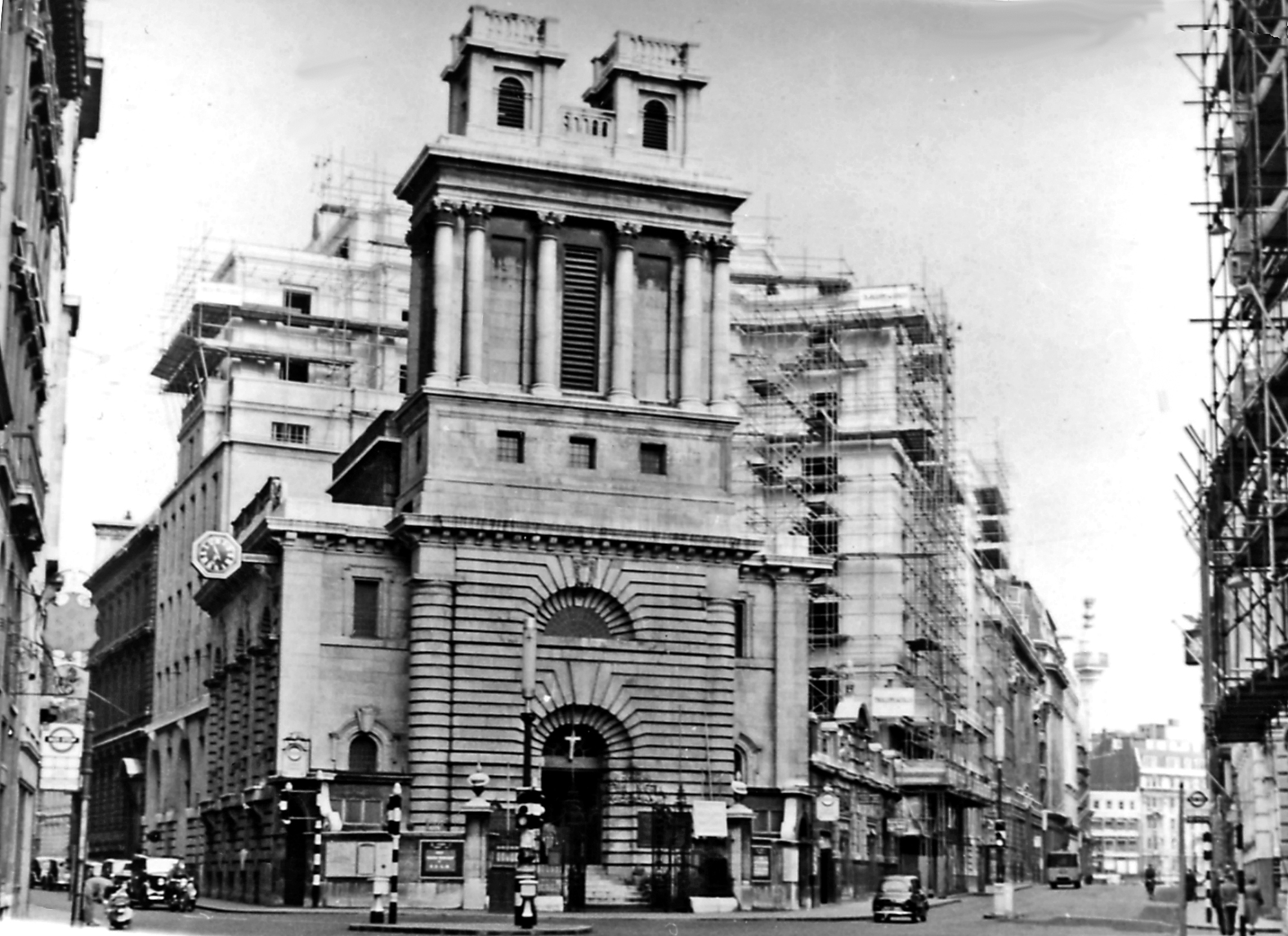
St Mary Woolnoth pictured in 1959.

The church was rebuilt by the Commission for Building Fifty New Churches. Work began in 1716 and the new church was reopened for worship on Easter Day 1727. It was commissioned from Nicholas Hawksmoor, who had responded with one of his most distinctive and original designs. He benefited greatly from having an unusually open area in which to work. The old church had been hemmed in by shops and houses, like many other City churches, but these were demolished at the same time as the church. Hawksmoor was thus able to fully exploit the unobstructed front of the site. St Mary Woolnoth is Hawksmoor's only City of London church.

The resultant church was something of an architectural statement on Hawksmoor's part. Its unusually imposing façade, in English Baroque style, is dominated by two flat-topped turrets supported by columns of the Corinthian order, which are used throughout the church. The west side of the façade, facing Lombard Street, has distinctive recesses bearing an inset forward-curving pediment resting on skewed columns.

The interior of the church is surprisingly spacious, despite its relatively small size. The layout is typical Hawksmoor, forming a "cube within a cube" – a square enclosed by three rows of four columns which is itself enclosed by a wider square. It is dominated by a baroque baldaquin, modelled on that of Bernini in St. Peter's Basilica in Rome.

=== Threatened demolition ===
The church underwent major changes in the late 19th century and the turn of the 20th century; it was proposed for demolition on several occasions but was saved each time. Its galleries were removed by William Butterfield in 1876, who thought they were unsafe, and a number of other significant (and not entirely successful) changes were made at the same time.

Between 1897 and 1900 the City & South London Railway (C&SLR) built Bank Underground station beneath the church. The C&SLR were given permission to demolish it, but public outcry forced them to reconsider: the company undertook to use only the subsoil instead. The crypt was sold to the railway and the bones were removed for reburial at City of London Cemetery in Manor Park. The walls and internal columns of the church were then supported on steel girders while the lift shafts and staircase shaft for Bank station were built directly beneath the church floor. At this time, the bells were also rehung with new fittings. No cracks formed in the plasterwork, and no settlement of the structure occurred; the company later claimed that the edifice of the church was considerably stronger than before.

== Mid-twentieth century ==
St Mary Woolnoth was designated a Grade I listed building on 4 January 1950, and in 1952 became a guild church.

== Present day ==
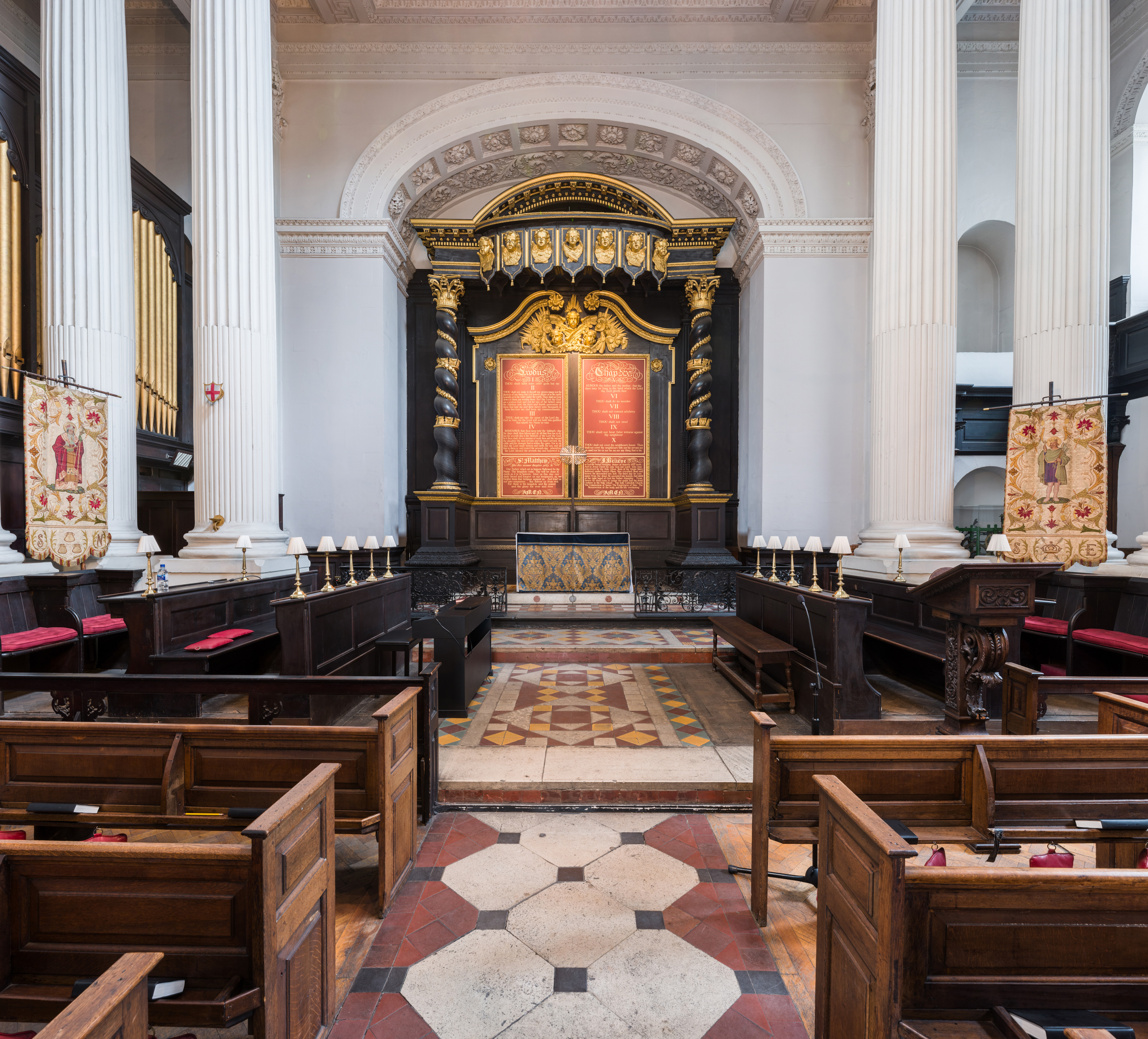
Interior of St Mary Woolnoth

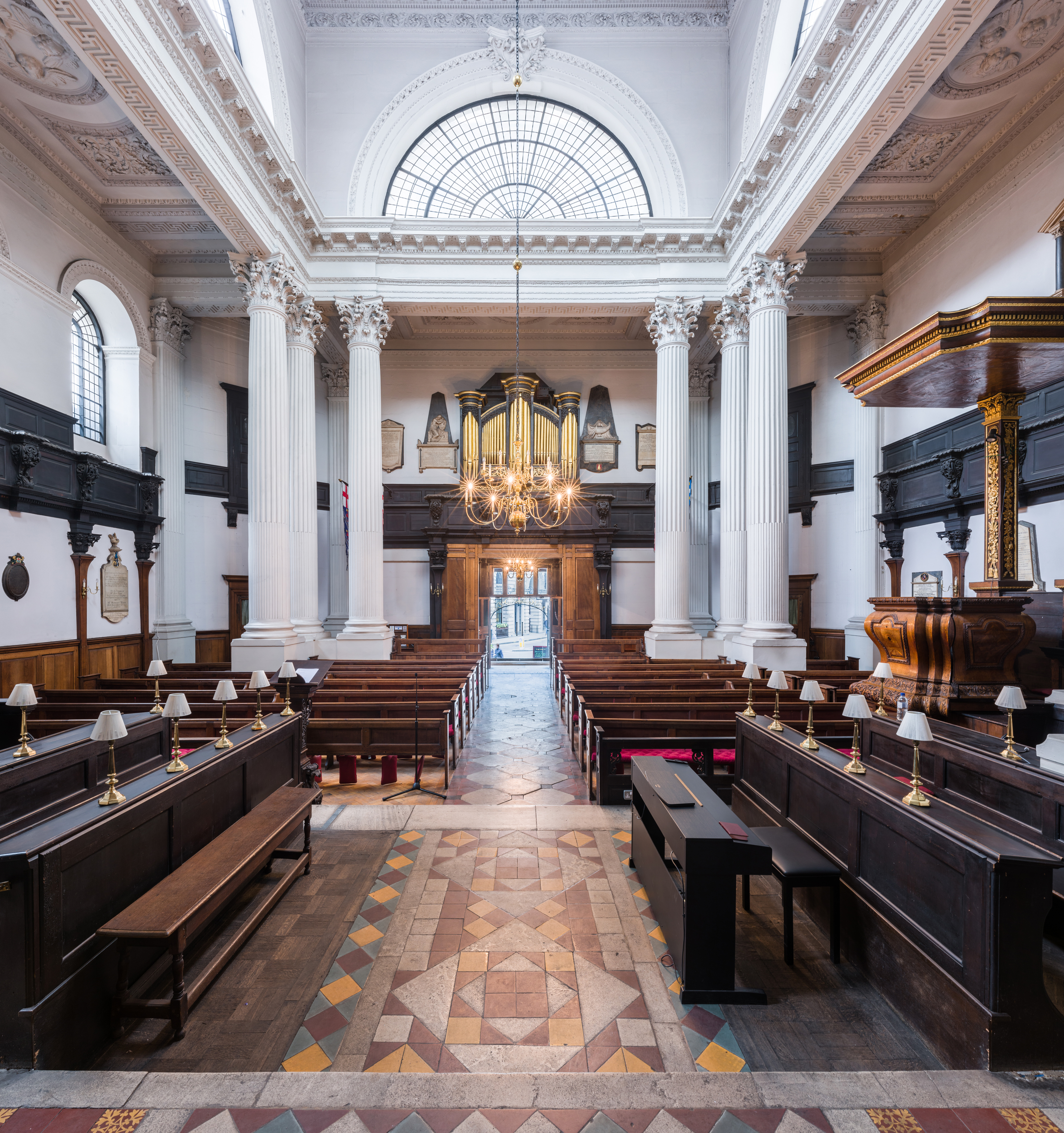
Looking back towards the entrance on Lombard and King William Street.

St Mary Woolnoth is the active parish church for the combined parish of St Edmund the King and Martyr, and St Mary Woolnoth Lombard Street with St Nicholas Acons, All Hallows Lombard Street, St Benet Gracechurch, St Leonard Eastcheap, St Dionis Backchurch and St Mary Woolchurch Haw – usually shortened to "St Edmund & St Mary Woolnoth" (the only two aforementioned churches to have survived). It is part of the Church of England's Diocese of London.

It is currently used by London's German-speaking Swiss community, and is also the official church in London of the government of British Columbia, Canada.

The 2013 boundary changes to the City's wards kept the church within Langbourn, despite the surrounding buildings being transferred to Candlewick and Walbrook wards, because of the church's strong connections with the ward.

== Notable people associated with the church ==
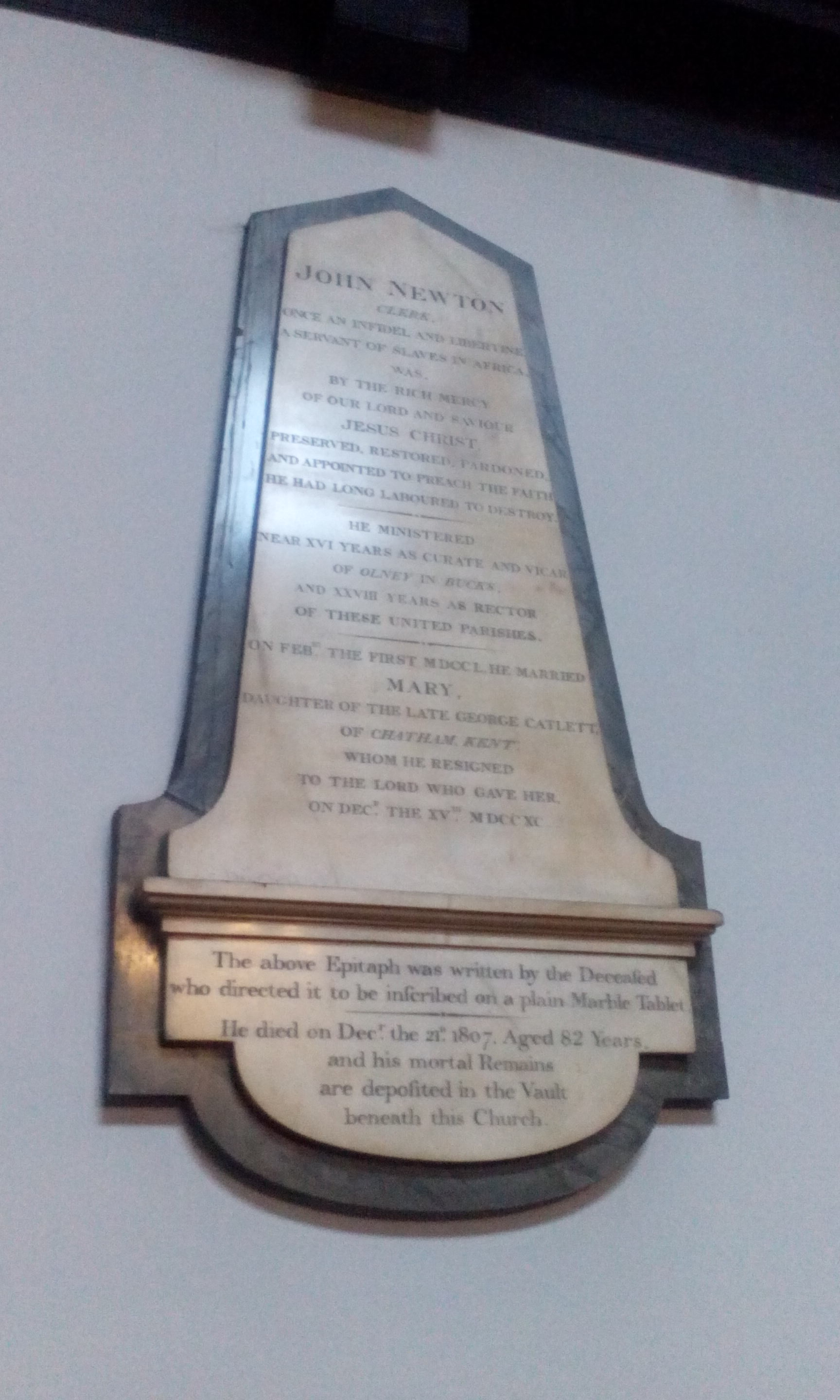
Memorial plaque to John Newton and his wife in the church.

- Sir Martin Bowes, Lord Mayor (1545–46) and Mint Master, was married and buried here, and his children and grandchildren baptized.
- Thomas Kyd, Elizabethan dramatist, was baptised here; his father Francis was also a churchwarden.
- Josias Shute was rector here from 1611.
- Ralph Robinson was presbyterian minister here in the 1640s.
- William Owtram was rector here.
- Thomas Busby the composer was organist here from 1798.
- John Newton, evangelical, anti-slavery campaigner and hymnist, was incumbent here from 1780 to 1807.
- William Wilberforce, anti-slavery campaigner, worshipped here.
- Edward Lloyd, founder of Lloyd's of London, is memorialised here.
- William Josiah Irons the theologian was rector here from 1872.
- Sir William Phips was buried here.18 February 1694/5
- Anne (Marbury) Hutchinson, noted American colonial woman, married William Hutchinson here in 1612.

== Literary reference ==
- T. S. Eliot refers to this church in his 1922 poem The Waste Land, Part 1, 'The Burial of the Dead':

A crowd flowed over London Bridge, so many,
I had not thought death had undone so many.
Sighs, short and infrequent, were exhaled,
And each man fixed his eyes before his feet.
Flowed up the hill and down King William Street,
To where Saint Mary Woolnoth kept the hours
With a dead sound on the final stroke of nine.
There I saw one I knew, and stopped him, crying, "Stetson!
You who were with me in the ships at Mylae!

In his notes to the poem Eliot remarks that the "dead sound on the final stroke of nine" was "A phenomenon which I have often noticed."

St Mary Woolnoth is an important historical site in Peter Ackroyd's 1985 novel Hawksmoor where it is the scene of one of a series of murders all taking place at churches redesigned by Nicholas Hawksmoor, who is given the fictional name Nicholas Dyer.

== See also ==
- List of churches in London

== Notes ==
- Betjeman, John (1967). The City of London Churches. Pitkin Pictorials. ISBN 0853721122.
