= All Hallows Lombard Street =

All Hallows Lombard Street or All Hallows Gracechurch Street
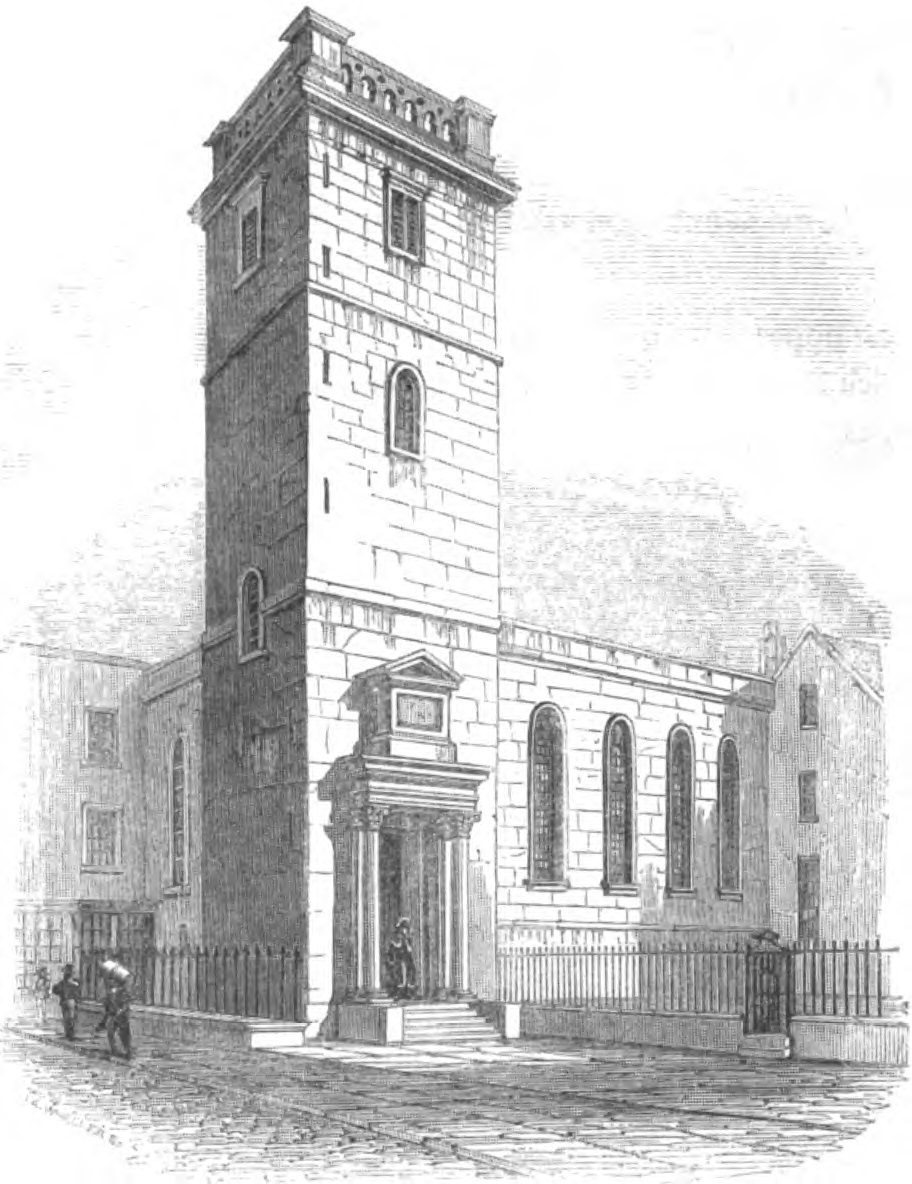
- All Hallows from Ball Alley in the 1820s
- All Hallows Lombard Street or All Hallows Gracechurch Street
- Location: One of four churches between Lombard Street, Cornhill and Gracechurch Street, London
- Country: England
- Denomination: Anglican
- Previous denomination: Roman Catholic

History
- Founded: before 1054

Architecture
- Years built: before 1065; rebuilt c.1500; rebuilt c.1694
- Closed: 1937
- Demolished: 1937

Administration
- Diocese: London
- Parish: All Hallows, Lombard Street

Clergy
- Bishop: Bishop of London

Coordinates:

All Hallows Lombard Street, also seen with the descriptor Gracechurch Street, was a parish church in the City of London. It stood behind thin buildings fronting both streets in Langbourn Ward, The west and south sides faced into Ball Alley. Of medieval origin, it was rebuilt after the Great Fire of London. It was demolished in 1937; its tower was reconstructed at Twickenham as part of the new church of All Hallows, which also received its bells and complete interior fittings.

== Medieval church ==
All Hallows is first recorded in 1054, when a citizen of London called Brihtmerus gave its patronage to the prior and chapter of Canterbury Cathedral. John Stow (d. 1605), recording all of London, calls it "All Hallows Grasse Church" because "the grass market went down that way, when that street was far broader than now it is".

The church was rebuilt around the beginning of the 16th century. The south aisle is recorded as having been completed in 1516. A north aisle and other works were paid for by the Pewterer's Company. A bell tower was completed in 1544 and the stone porch from the dissolved priory/monastery of St John of Jerusalem, (Clerkenwell Priory) was used. The monastery's bells also were purchased, but, due to the death of a benefactor, never installed, leaving the tower with only one bell.

Following the dissolution of the monasteries the patronage was transferred to the Dean and Chapter of Canterbury.

== Rebuilding after the Great Fire ==
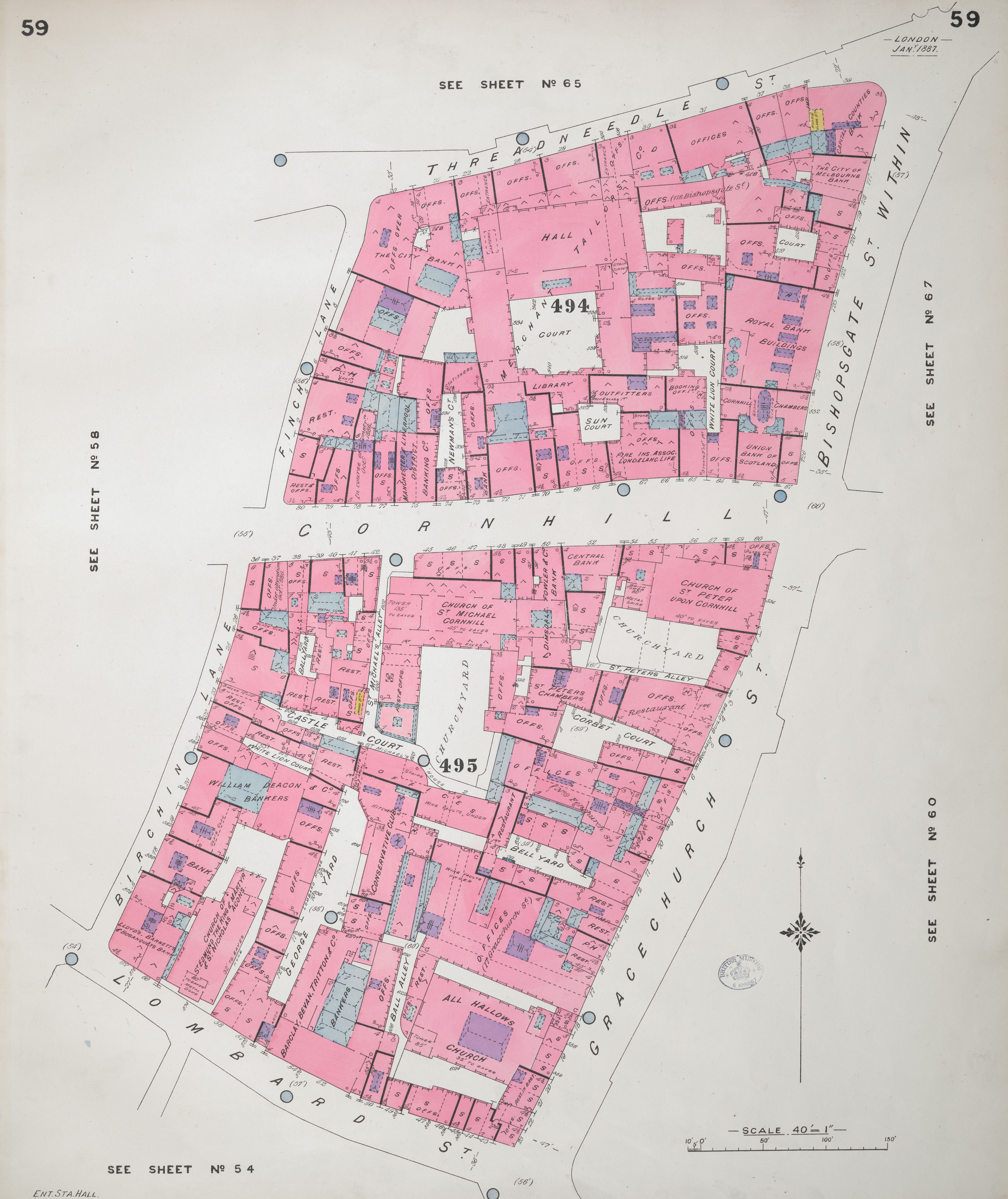

Extract of map of 1887. It shows the shops and houses on all sides of the church and fire risk level.

All Hallows was badly damaged in the Great Fire of 1666. The parishioners attempted to patch it up, and had the walls rendered with straw and lime in an attempt to stop any further decay. A bell was hung in the steeple, despite its perilous condition, as late as 1679. Ultimately, however, restoration proved impractical and the old building was replaced with a new one designed by the office of Sir Christopher Wren. It was completed in 1694 at a cost of £8,058 15s. 6d (equivalent to £1,500,000 in 2025).

The exterior was plain. In the 1830s George Godwin noted that the church was so hemmed in by other buildings, that "it is with difficulty discovered, even when looked for; it has in consequence been called 'the invisible church'." The stone tower stood at the west end of the south wall. As seen in the faithful rebuilding in Twickenham today, the tower has three storeys. The lowest storey has with a small porch formed by Corinthian columns with entablature and pediment, giving access to the body of the church through a vestibule; the second storey: round-headed windows; the third: square openings with louvres, each surmounted by a plain cornice (ledge). A cornice and parapet complete. It reaches, as then, about 85 feet (26 m) in height.

The church was 84 feet (26 m) long and 52 feet (16 m) wide. The interior was a simple undivided space, without aisles; a gallery at the west end was supported on a single column. The ceiling was coved at the sides. There were five windows on the north side, and four on the south, but the only illumination at the east end was through two small windows in the side walls of the recess housing the reredos. In 1880 additional lighting was provided by inserting a rectangular skylight in the ceiling. The walls were panelled with oak to the height of 9 feet (2.7 m). Above the northern doorcase stood a wooden figure of Death, about four feet high, and over the southern one was a similar figure of Time. The upper parts of each of these doorcases were carved with openwork decoration "the view whereof is intercepted by an artificial white curtain, likewise carved, but so natural that many have attempted to draw it on one side". The Corporation pew, in the south-east corner, had two sword-rests. There were high-backed seats for the churchwardens, their ends ornamented with the Lion and Unicorn. Attached to the wall in the vestibule was a frame containing shelves for loaves for distribution to the poor. There was an oak reredos, ornamented with a carved pelican and seven candlesticks.

An organ built by Renatus Harris was installed in 1695, only being replaced in 1902 by one commissioned from Noble & Sons.

During the Napoleonic Wars, the roof space was used as a storeroom for ammunition by a volunteer corps.

== John Wesley ==
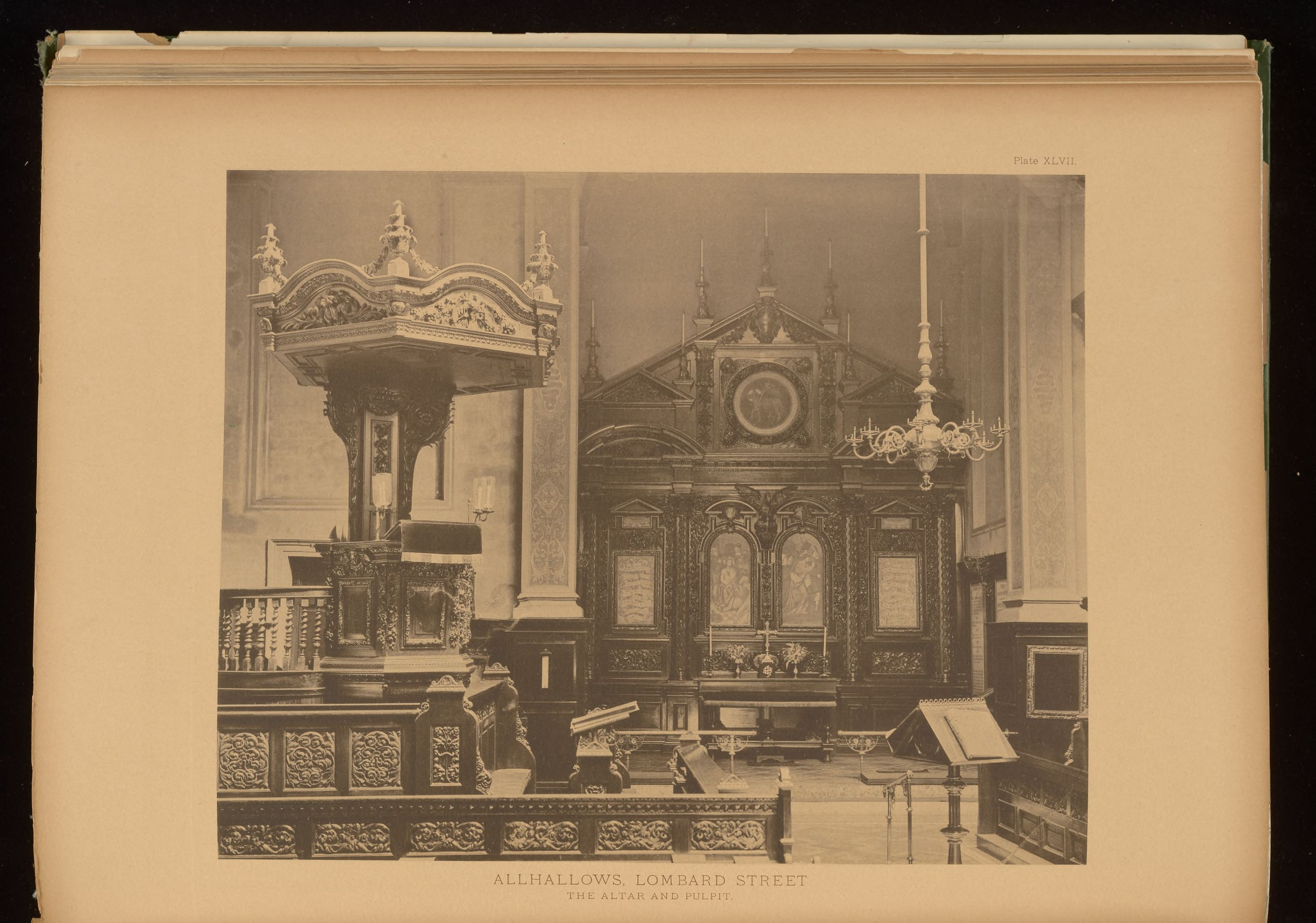
The altar and pulpit (c. 1890).

An entry in the parish record book for 28 December 1789 states that John Wesley preached at Evensong. He recalled an earlier incident where, just as he was about to preach, he realised he had forgotten his sermon, and confided this to the attendant verger.

The reply came ”What cannot you trust God for a sermon?” and upon this rebuke I went into the pulpit and preached with much freedom and acceptance; and from that time I have never taken a manuscript with me.

== Demolition ==
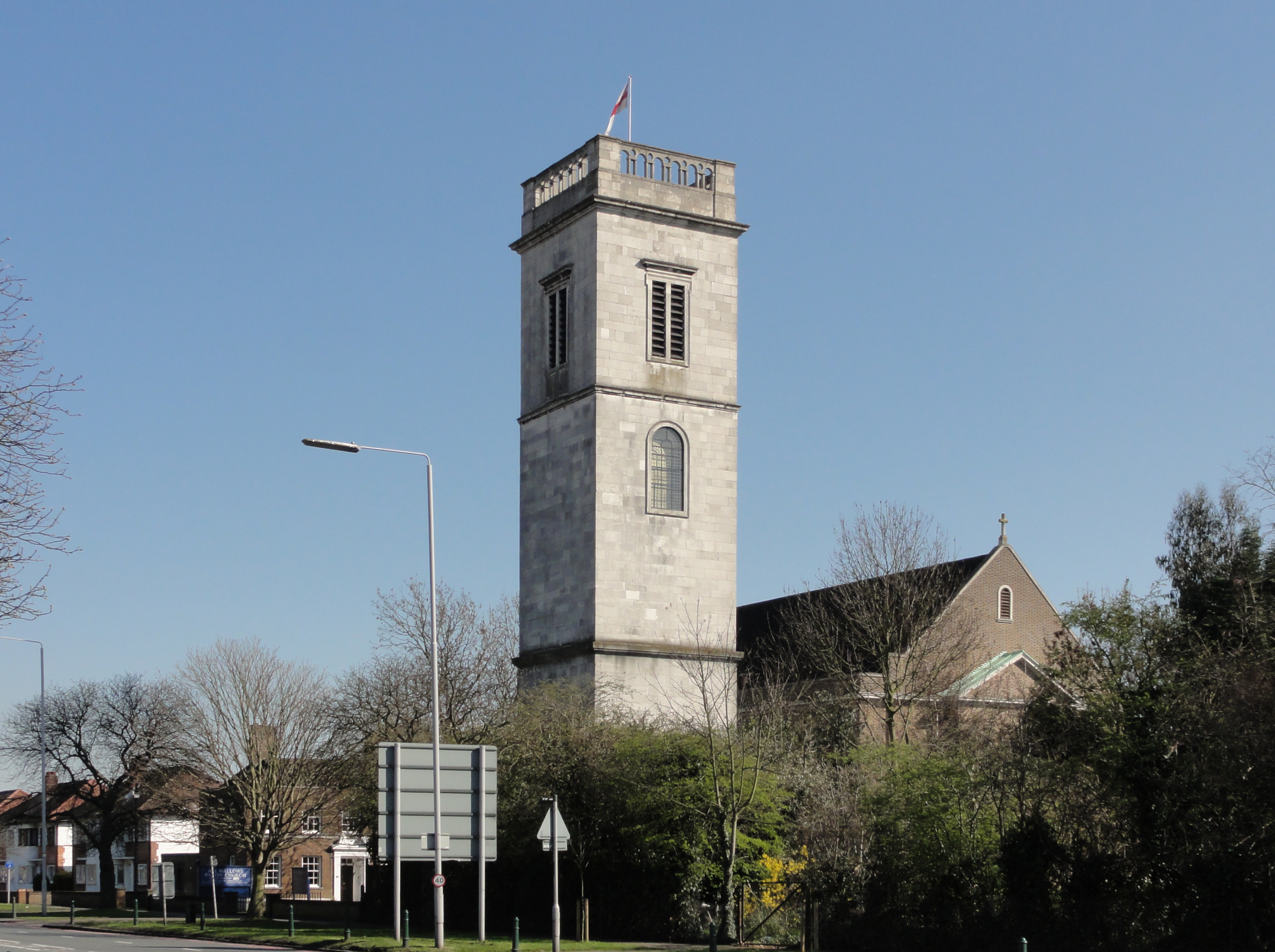
Wren's tower, porch and fittings were moved to form part of All Hallows Church, Twickenham.

In 1879 ten bells from St Dionis Backchurch were hung at the church, but such optimism could not disguise the fact that the residential population of the city was falling, year on year. After the First World War the church was earmarked for demolition, despite fierce opposition. In 1937 the church, which had been found to be unsafe, was demolished and Wren's tower, porch and the furnishings were reused in the construction of All Hallows Twickenham. The small parish was united with St Edmund the King and Martyr which lies the same length of the former church to the west. (Note: Under the Union of Benefices Act 1860 which allowed City churches to go so and for their land to be sold if a church was built in the suburbs.)

The site now forms part of the tall, multi-unit building including 2 George Yard and 20 Gracechurch Street. These remain partly fronted by small retail units: Itsu, Gap and New Look.

Ball Alley, which connected the church with Lombard Street and George Yard is part of the replacement building today. In its final decades it was accessed only by narrow pedestrian entrances and the west limb by the west end of the church was very narrow. A similar void was by the north side of the church, seemingly with few doors. The east side of the church directly attached to shops on Gracechurch Street and the south side of the church fronted the wider part of Ball Alley. A parish boundary mark survives in Lombard Street.

== Present day ==
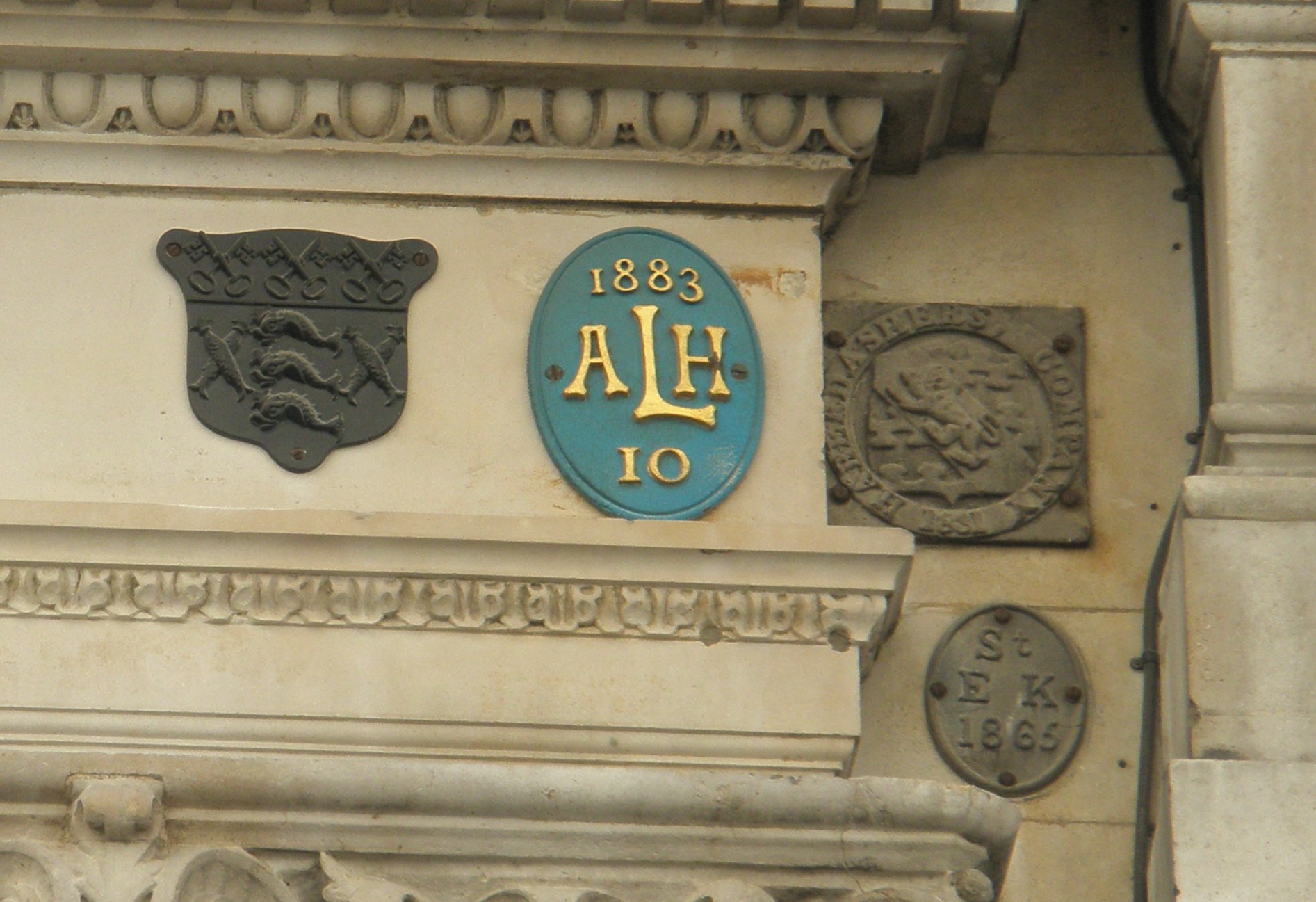
Parish marks in Lombard Street

The parish now forms part of the combined parish of St Edmund the King and Martyr, and St Mary Woolnoth Lombard Street with St Nicholas Acons, All Hallows Lombard Street, St Benet Gracechurch, St Leonard Eastcheap, St Dionis Backchurch and St Mary Woolchurch Haw – usually shortened to "St Edmund & St Mary Woolnoth". It is part of the Church of England's Diocese of London.

== See also ==
- List of Christopher Wren churches in London
- List of churches rebuilt after the Great Fire but since demolished
- All Hallows Twickenham
- All Hallows, Bread Street – another destroyed & rebuilt church in the same general area

== Notes and references ==
Notes
