= St Mary Woolchurch Haw =

Former church-site in London

Coordinates: 51°30′43″N 0°5′20″W

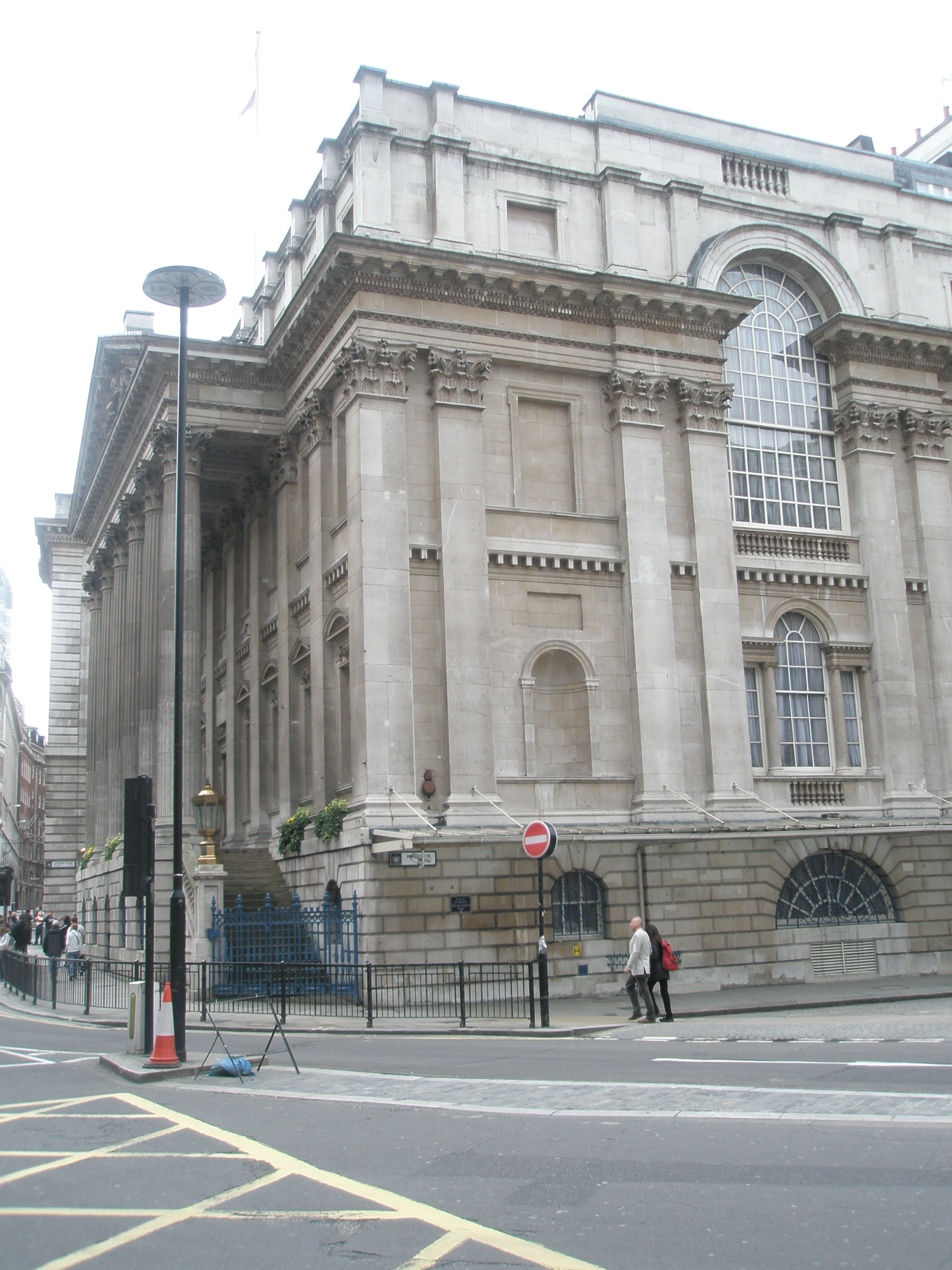
- Current photo of site
- St Mary Woolchurch Haw
- Location: Mansion House, London
- Country: England
- Denomination: Church of England

History
- Founded: 13th century

Architecture
- Demolished: 1666

St Mary Woolchurch Haw was a parish church in the City of London, destroyed in the Great Fire of London of 1666 and not rebuilt. It came within the ward of Walbrook.

== History ==
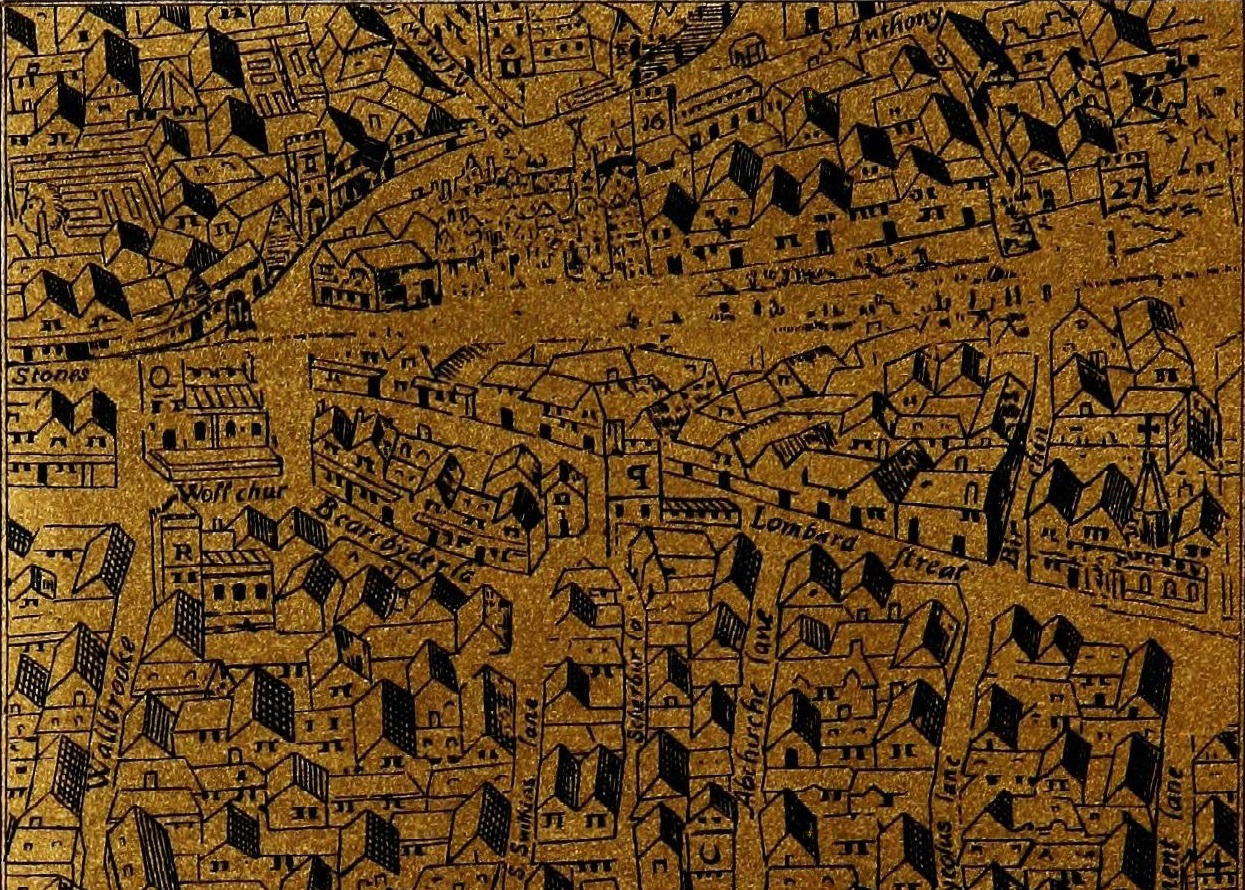
A section of the "woodcut" map of London of c.1561, showing St Mary Woollchurch Haw (marked "Q"), St Mary Woolnoth (marked with a reversed "P") and St Stephen's, Walbrook (marked "R").

The church of St Mary Woolchurch Haw was an ancient foundation, dating from the time of William I, when it was given to the Abbot and Convent of St John's, Colchester, by Hubert of Ryes, who was the father of Eudo Dapifer, William's steward. In the Charter of Endowment, it is referred to as "St Mary of West Cheaping, which is called Newchurch"; the eastern end of Cheapside is now called Poultry. It became the property of the crown after the dissolution.

The name is said to be derived from a beam that was once fixed in the churchyard, which was used for weighing wool. The church was rebuilt in the reign of Henry VI. At the end of the sixteenth century John Stow described it as "reasonably fair and large", and John Strype recorded that it was "richly repaired and beautified, at the Charge of the Parishioners" in 1629.

St Mary Woolchurch Haw was one of the 86 parish churches destroyed by the Great Fire in 1666. The parish clerk and the sexton were able to rescue the "plate" (the silverware used during services), "the new great Bible" and some vestments; while the clerk was doing this, all his own property was burned. In 1670 a Rebuilding Act was passed and a committee set up under the stewardship of Sir Christopher Wren to decide which would be rebuilt. Fifty-one were chosen, but St Mary Woolchurch Haw was not among them. The parish was united to that of St Mary Woolnoth.

The Mansion House now stands on the site.

== Present day ==
The parish now forms part of the combined parish of St Edmund the King and Martyr, and St Mary Woolnoth Lombard Street with St Nicholas Acons, All Hallows Lombard Street, St Benet Gracechurch, St Leonard Eastcheap, St Dionis Backchurch and St Mary Woolchurch Haw – usually shortened to "St Edmund & St Mary Woolnoth". It is part of the Church of England's Diocese of London.
