= St Dionis Backchurch =

Former church-site in London

Coordinates: 51°30′43″N 0°5′2″W

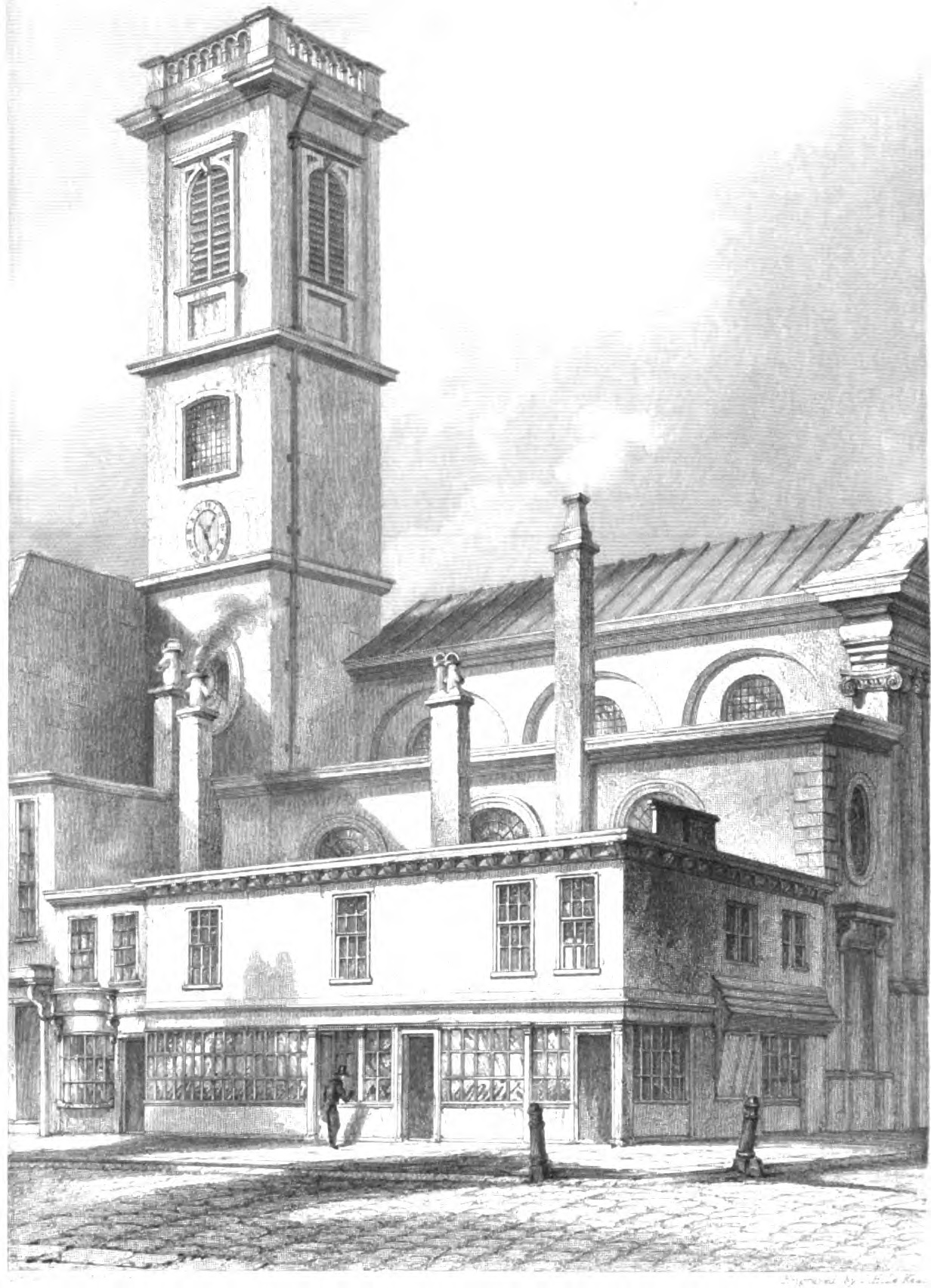
- St Dionis Backchurch
- OS grid reference: TQ 33060 80964
- Location: London
- Country: England
- Denomination: Anglican

Architecture
- Architect: Christopher Wren
- Style: Baroque
- Demolished: 1878

St Dionis Backchurch was a parish church in the Langbourn ward of the City of London. Of medieval origin, it was rebuilt after the Great Fire of London to the designs of Christopher Wren and demolished in 1878.

== Early history ==
The church of St Dionis was dedicated to Dionysus the Areopagite. The name Backchurch could have come from its standing behind other buildings, or from its position relative to the church of St Gabriel Fenchurch. It was in existence by the year 1288, when Reginald de Standen was recorded as being the rector. In 1466 the Alderman John Darby had an aisle added, in which he was buried. John Strype noted that "The middle Ile of this Church was new laid in the Year of our Lord 1629. The Steeple was repaired, a new Turret built, new Frames were made for the Bells, and this Church was decently beautified in the Year of our Lord 1632".

The patronage of the church belonged to the prior and canons of Christchurch, Canterbury until the Dissolution, after which it passed to the dean and chapter of Canterbury Cathedral.

The burial registers of St Dionis Backchurch include two Virginians "out of Sir Thomas Smithes house" who died in October and November 1613, and a third Virginian man Abraham who died in August 1616. Smythe's house was in Philpot Lane.

== Rebuilding after the Great Fire ==
The church was destroyed in the Great Fire of London in 1666, and rebuilt to the designs of Christopher Wren in 1674 at a cost of £5,737. A tower, also to Wren's design, was added ten years later.

The church was built mostly of stone, with some brick which was later stuccoed. The east end of the church, in Lime Street, had a pediment and two pairs of coupled Ionic pilasters with a large window below carved festoons. A row of shops, built against the south wall, stood between the church and Fenchurch street. A survey of 1858 revealed that a 15th-Century crypt had survived underneath Wren's chancel.

The main body of Wren's church was 66 feet long and 59 feet wide. It was divided into nave and aisles by Ionic columns supporting an entablature. The ceiling of the nave was arched, and pierced with circular windows under groin vaulted openings, while the aisle ceilings were horizontal. There was a west gallery with an organ.

The bell tower was divided into three storeys by string courses. At the top was an open parapet, and a small bell turret which had been removed by the nineteenth century.

In 1724 the church received a new three manual organ with 29 stops, large for its day, which cost £749. It was designed by Renatus Harris and approved by a number of experts including George Frederick Handel. Charles Burney was later to be appointed organist in 1749.

== Demolition ==
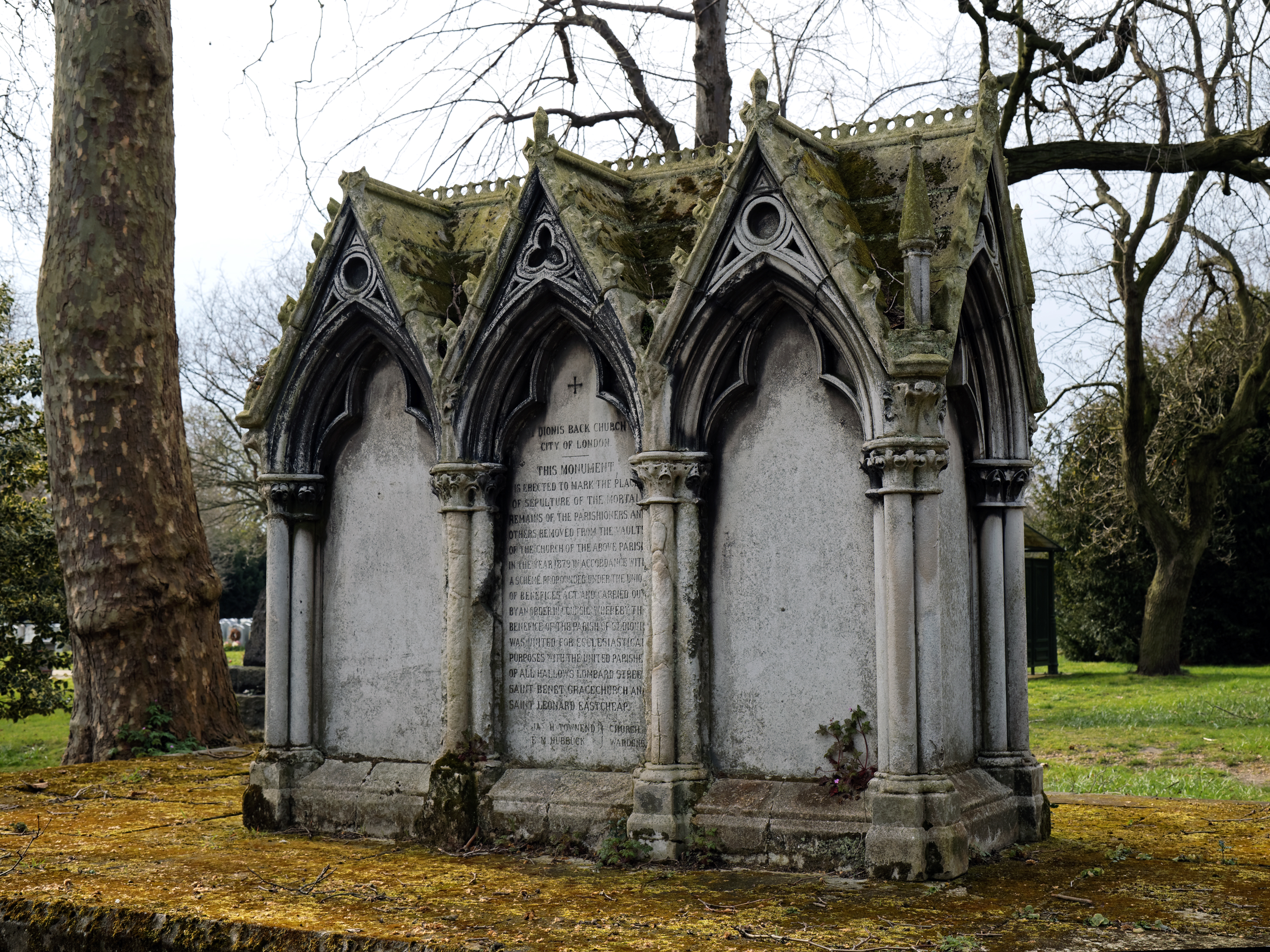
St Dionis Backchurch reburials monument at the City of London Cemetery

In 1858, the vestry asked the architect George Edmund Street to examine the fabric of the church. He found that the church was in need of substantial repairs and recommended that the most economical course of action would be to demolish the whole church except for the tower, and rebuild it to a Gothic design of his own. Before any such plans could be carried out, however, the vestry decided that the church was no longer needed. In 1878 the parish was merged with that of All Hallows Lombard Street under the Union of Benefices Act 1860 and the church demolished.

The church had a peal of ten bells, cast between 1726 and 1750. They were transferred to All Hallows Lombard Street when St Dionis was demolished. The City church of All Hallows was in turn demolished and the bell tower rebuilt at All Hallows, Twickenham, where six of the bells survive.

The church of St. Dionis, Parsons Green was built with the proceeds of the sale of the site of the City church, and its font and pulpit survive there. The burials were reinhumed at the City of London Cemetery.

According to William Leslie Sumner's The Organ, the organ at St Dionis – a fine instrument by all accounts and the last to be built by Renatus Harris in 1724 – was removed first to St Mark's, East Walworth where the case was left after the organ itself was again removed to Darenth Training Colony, Dartford, Kent. The pipework was later incorporated into the Mander organ at St Vedast alias Foster, Foster Lane, in the City of London.

A City of London commemorative plaque noting the year of demolition is attached to the wall of the buildings that now occupy the former site of St Dionis Backchurch, opposite number 24 Lime Street EC3, and a parish mark can be seen in Philpot Lane.

== Present day ==
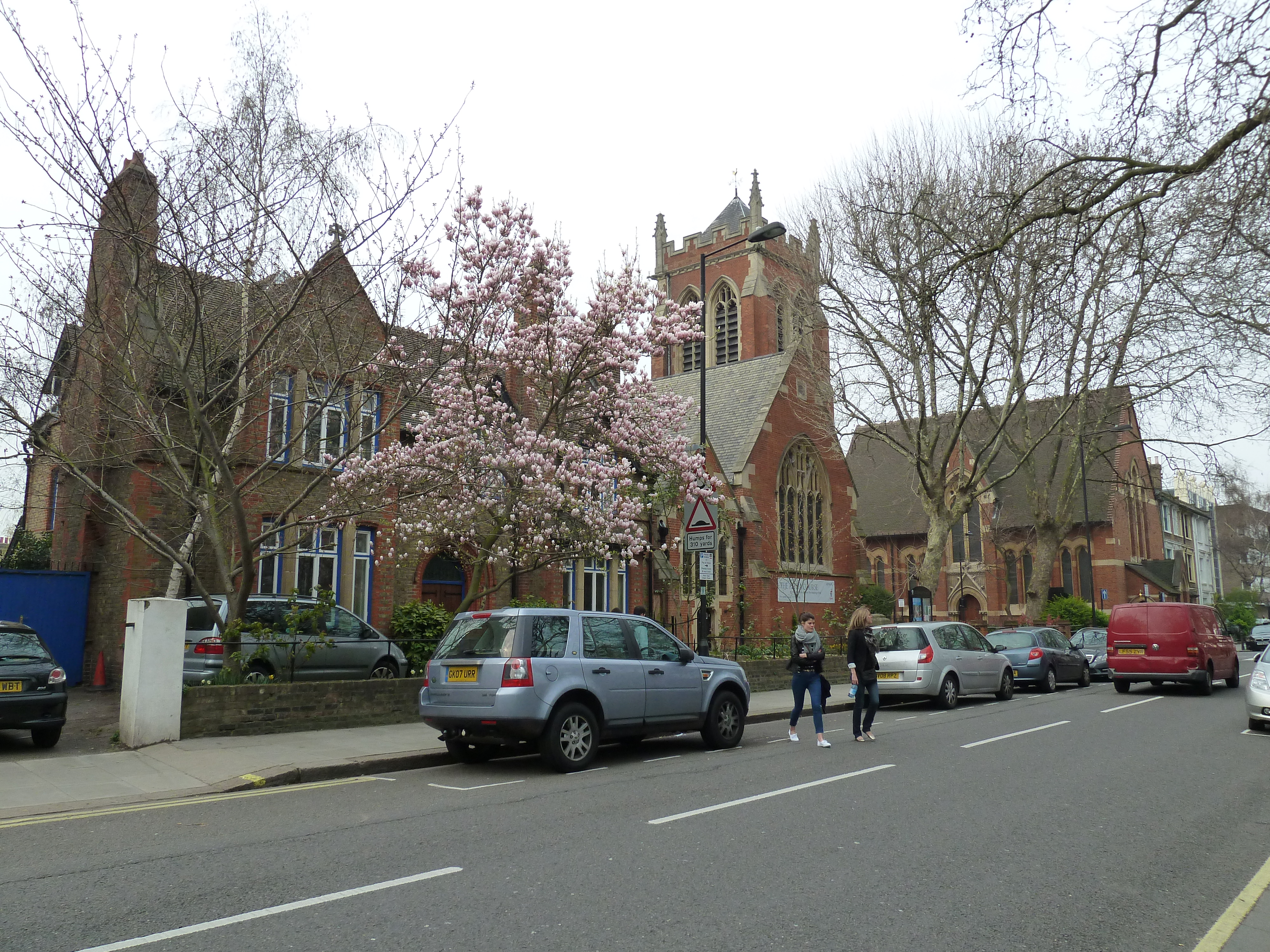
The modern reincarnation in Parsons Green

The parish now forms part of the combined parish of St Edmund the King and Martyr, and St Mary Woolnoth Lombard Street with St Nicholas Acons, All Hallows Lombard Street, St Benet Gracechurch, St Leonard Eastcheap, St Dionis Backchurch and St Mary Woolchurch Haw – usually shortened to "St Edmund & St Mary Woolnoth". It is part of the Church of England's Diocese of London.

== See also ==
- List of Christopher Wren churches in London
- List of churches rebuilt after the Great Fire but since demolished
