= St Leonard, Eastcheap =

Former church-site in London

Coordinates: 51°30′36″N 0°5′5″W

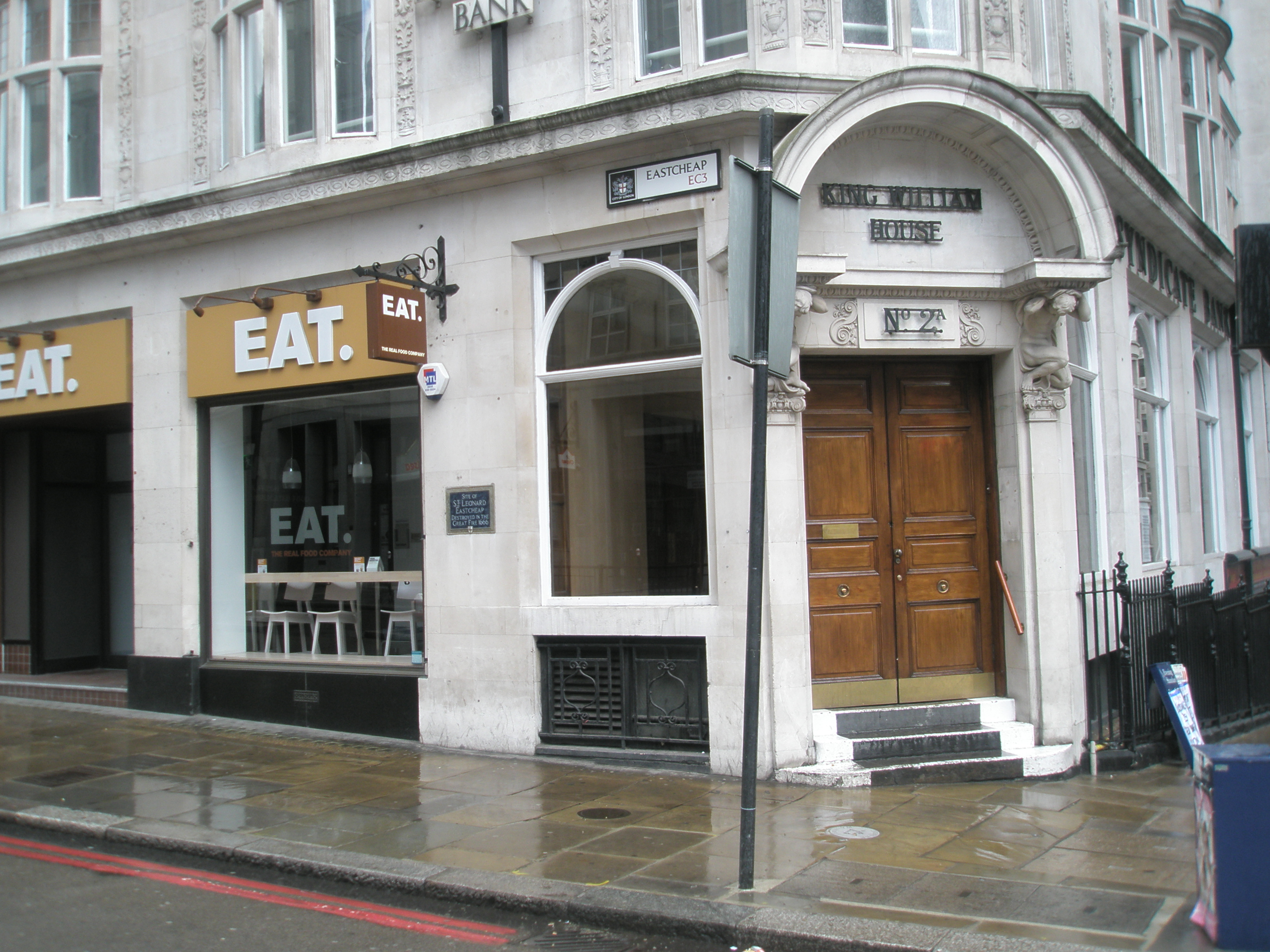
- Current photo of site
- St Leonard, Eastcheap
- Location: Eastcheap, London
- Country: England
- Denomination: Church of England

History
- Founded: 11th century

Architecture
- Demolished: 1666

St. Leonard, Eastcheap, sometimes referred to as St Leonard Milkchurch, was a parish church in the City of London. Of medieval origin, it was destroyed in the Great Fire of London in 1666 and not rebuilt. The site of the church was retained as a graveyard.

== History ==
The church stood in Fish Street Hill, on the corner of Eastcheap, in the ward of Bridge Within. It was also known as St Leonard Milkchurch, a name, according to John Stow, derived from one of its builders, William Melker. Its existence is recorded as early as 1259.

During the 19th century, excavations in Eastcheap for the new Metropolitan District Railway revealed the foundations of the church. They showed the remains of a long chancel and a nave, the masonry on the north side of which incorporated what was believed to be Roman brickwork.

The patronage of the church belonged to the prior and abbey of Christchurch, Canterbury, and then to the dean and chapter of Canterbury Cathedral.

The church contained monuments to the members of the Dogget family, including John Dogget, who died in about 1456 and gave land to the church.

In 1618 the church was badly damaged by fire. The steeple, with its lead-covered spire, and the west end of the church were so badly damaged that they had to be demolished, and reconstructed on new foundations. The south wall was then also rebuilt, and other repairs made. The church was destroyed in the Great Fire of London in 1666 and not rebuilt. Instead its parish was united with that of St Benet Gracechurch and the site of the church was retained as a graveyard.

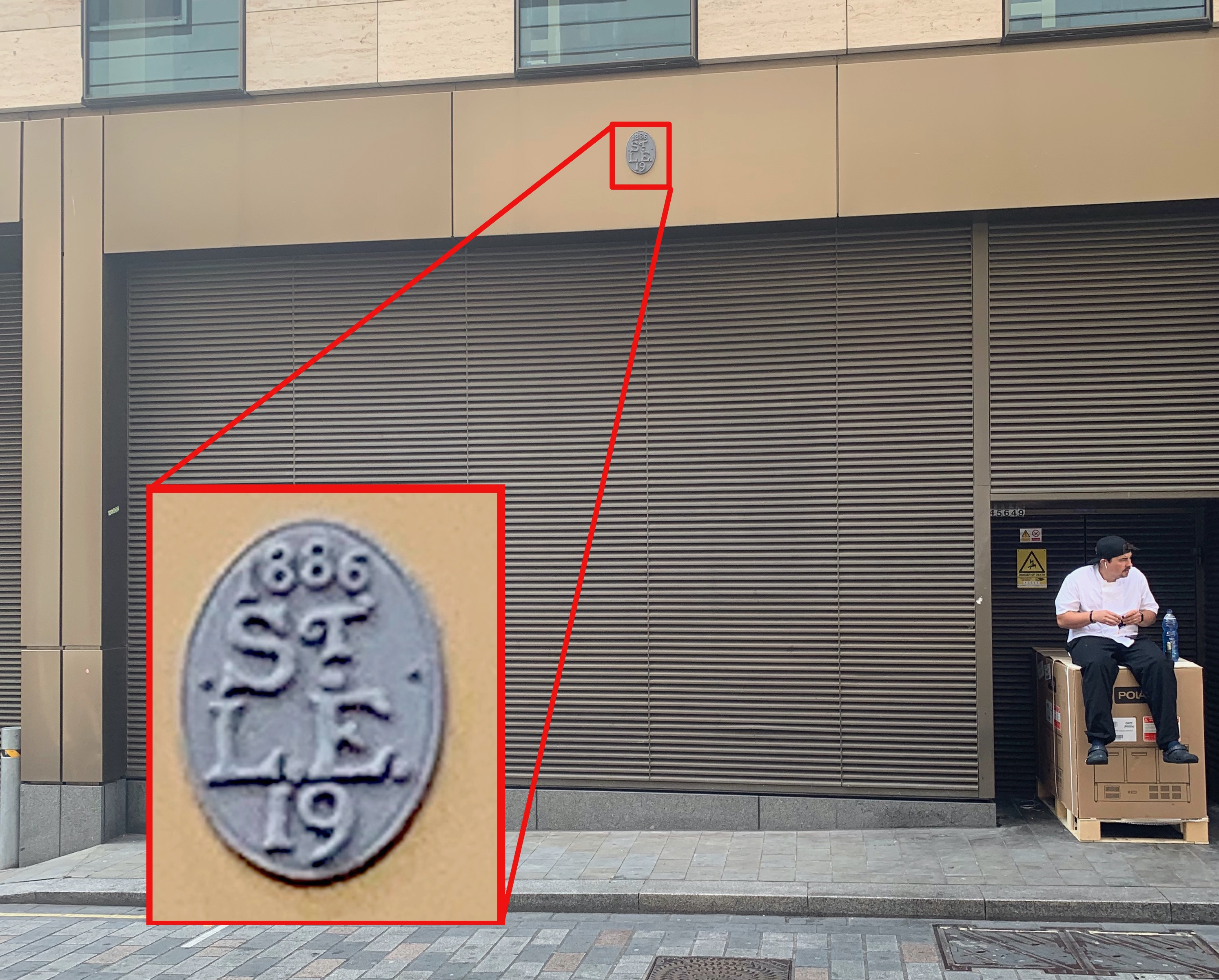
Parish Boundary Marker for St Leonard Eastcheap in Pudding Lane near Monument

== Present day ==
The parish now forms part of the combined parish of St Edmund the King and Martyr, and St Mary Woolnoth Lombard Street with St Nicholas Acons, All Hallows Lombard Street, St Benet Gracechurch, St Leonard Eastcheap, St Dionis Backchurch and St Mary Woolchurch Haw – usually shortened to "St Edmund & St Mary Woolnoth". It is part of the Church of England's Diocese of London.
