= St Benet Gracechurch =

Former church in London

Coordinates: 51°30′42″N 0°5′6″W

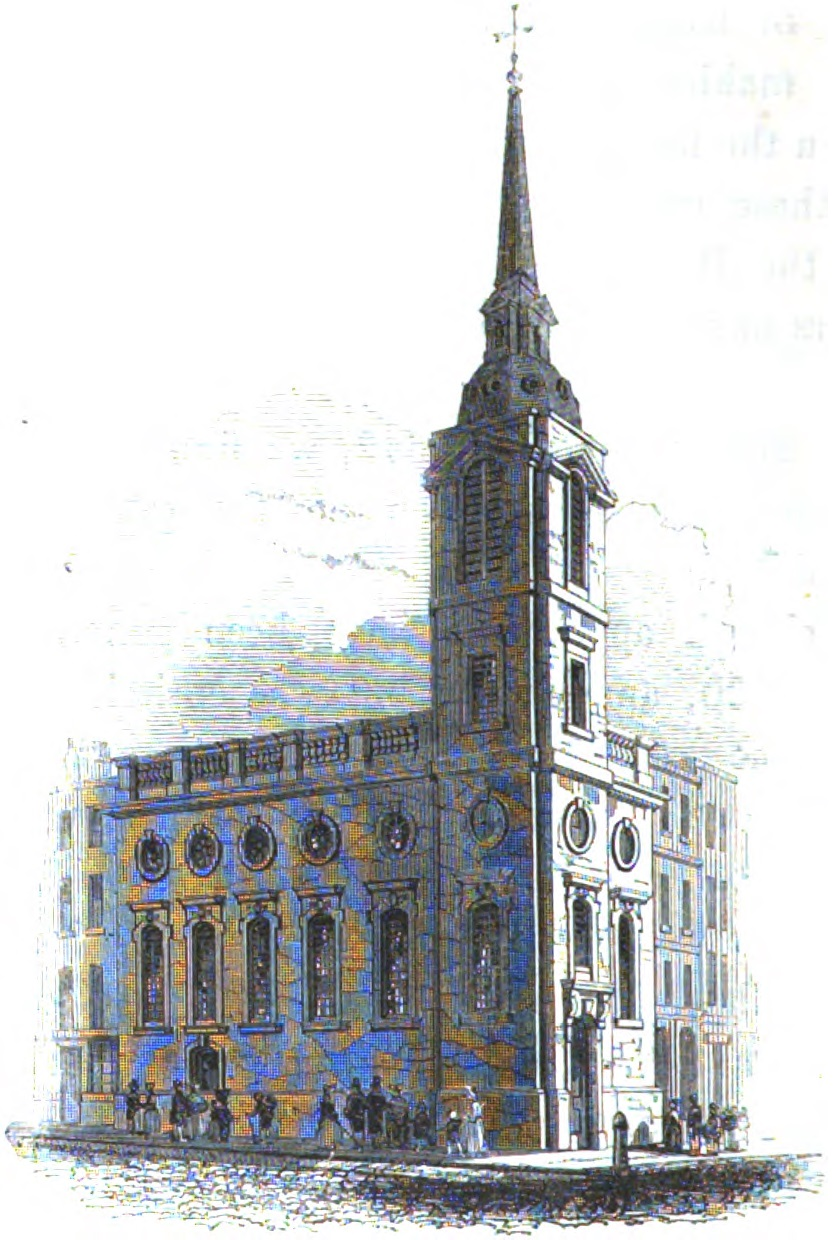
- St Benet Gracechurch in the 1820s
- St Benet Gracechurch
- Location: Gracechurch Street, London
- Country: England
- Denomination: Anglican

Architecture
- Demolished: 1868

St Benet Gracechurch (or Grass Church) was a parish church in the City of London. First recorded in the 11th century, it was destroyed in the Great Fire of London of 1666 and rebuilt by the office of Sir Christopher Wren. The church was demolished in 1868.

== Location ==
The church was in Bridge ward, on the corner of Fenchurch Street and Gracechurch Street.

== History ==
=== Dedication ===
St Benet is short for 'St Benedict', and St Benet Gracechurch was one of four churches in pre-Fire London dedicated to St Benedict of Nursia, the 6th-century founder of Western monasticism. Gracechurch meant 'Grass Church', referring, according to Gerald Cobb, to the site of a hay market nearby.

=== Middle Ages ===
The earliest surviving reference to the church is in the 1053 Charter of Brihtmaer conveying a church in Gracechurch Street to Christ Church, Canterbury. The dedication to St Benedict is first recorded during the reign of Henry III.

=== Post-Reformation ===
In 1553, at the beginning of the reign of Mary I, the churchwardens paid 3s. 4d. to a plasterer to remove the biblical texts painted on the interior walls during the time of her Protestant brother Edward VI. Shortly afterwards, church records recount that a Te Deum was sung "for the birth of our Prince (which was thought then to be)" – a reference to one of Mary's phantom pregnancies. The steeple was rebuilt in 1625. There were further alterations in 1642 when, for religious reasons, the "popish altar cloth" and "superstitious brasses" were sold. The cross was taken down from the steeple and a workman was paid "for defacing superstitious things in the church".

According to John Strype, the church was repaired and beautified in 1630 and 1633. Strype or John Stow mention various tombs there, including that of the Chamberlain of London John Sturgeon (d. 1571), and also a monument to Queen Elizabeth I.

The parish registers record a child named Grace Church, a foundling left to be cared for by the parish.

=== Rebuilding after the Great Fire ===
The church was destroyed in the Great Fire of 1666 except for the tower, which remained standing for a while but was demolished to make way for the new church. The parish was combined with that of St Leonard Eastcheap in 1670, and rebuilding began in 1681. The 1686 accounts include an entry of £1 14s 0d "to wine and sweetmeats for treating the Lord Mayor at the opening of the Church", although work on the spire continued into the following year. The total cost of the church was £4,583.

The rebuilt church was rectangular in plan, with a tower, topped by a spire, rising from the north-west corner. There were five round-headed windows on the main, north front, with a circular window above each one. The walls were topped by balustrades. The tower was square in plan. Above the belfry window was a broken pediment containing a small window. The tower was surmounted by a lead-covered dome decorated with cartouches. On top of the dome was a square entablature, comprising four arches with pediments, from which rose a tall spire, with a flag finial at the top; the whole structure being in total 149 feet (45 m) high.

The interior was 60 feet (18 m) long and 30 feet (9.1 m) wide: "much smaller than would be expected from the external appearance", according to George Godwin. It was a single space, undivided by columns, with a vaulted ceiling. There was a small gallery at the west end. The east wall above the reredos was painted in imitation of a crimson-and-gold curtain. St Benet Gracechurch was one of only two Wren churches never to have an organ.

In 1791, George Gaskin, the secretary of the Society for Promoting Christian Knowledge, became rector at St Benet's. His society work entailed co-ordinating the distribution of Bibles and other religious works throughout the British Isles. In 1797, he took up the position of rector of the church of Stoke Newington, while maintaining the benefice of St Benet.

=== Demolition ===
The 19th century saw a movement of population from the City of London to surrounding suburbs. This left many of the city churches with tiny congregations, while many of the newly built suburbs had no churches. The Union of Benefices Act 1860 was passed by Parliament, permitting the demolition of City churches and the sale of land to raise money to build churches in the suburbs. St Benet Gracechurch was demolished in 1868 so that Gracechurch Street could be widened. The land was sold for £24,000 and the proceeds used to build St Benet Mile End Road. The parish was combined with that of nearby All Hallows Lombard Street and the furnishings distributed among several churches. The pulpit is now in St Olave Hart Street. The interments were reburied in the City of London Cemetery, at Manor Park.

The site, at the intersection of Gracechurch and Fenchurch Streets, is now occupied by a seven-storey office block, built in 1997.

== Present day ==
The parish now forms part of the combined parish of St Edmund the King and Martyr, and St Mary Woolnoth Lombard Street with St Nicholas Acons, All Hallows Lombard Street, St Benet Gracechurch, St Leonard Eastcheap, St Dionis Backchurch and St Mary Woolchurch Haw – usually shortened to "St Edmund & St Mary Woolnoth". It is part of the Church of England's Diocese of London.

== Sources ==
- Cobb, Gerald. London City Churches, B T Batsford Ltd, 1977.
- Ellen, R.G. A London Steeplechase, City Press, 1972.
- Hibbert, C./Keay, J./Weinreb, D. The London Encyclopaedia, Pan Macmillan, 2008.
- Jeffery, Paul. The City Churches of Sir Christopher Wren, Hambledon Press, 1996.
- Malcolm, James Peller (1803). Londinium Redivivium, or, an Ancient History and Modern Description of London. Vol. 1. London.
- Austen, Jane. Pride and Prejudice – the church in which Lydia Bennet married Mr Wickham.

== See also ==
- List of Christopher Wren churches in London
- List of churches rebuilt after the Great Fire but since demolished
