= Ralph Robinson (priest) =

English presbyterian minister

Ralph Robinson (1614–1655) was an English minister of presbyterian views, arrested as implicated in the plot of Christopher Love to restore the Stuart monarchy.

== Life ==
He born at Heswall, Cheshire, in June 1614, and was educated at St Catharine Hall, Cambridge, where he graduated Bachelor of Arts (BA) 1638, and Cambridge Master of Arts (MA Cantab) 1642. On the strength of his preaching he was invited to St. Mary's Woolnoth, Lombard Street, London, and there received presbyterian ordination about 1642.

He was scribe to the first assembly of provincial ministers held in London in 1647, and united with them in the protest against the execution of Charles I in 1649. On 11 June 1651 he was arrested on a charge of being concerned in the conspiracy of Christopher Love. He was next day committed to the Tower of London, and appears to have been detained there at any rate until October, when an order for his trial was issued. Perhaps he was never brought up, but if so it was to be pardoned.

He died on 15 June 1655, and was buried on the 18th in the chancel of St. Mary Woolnoth. His funeral sermon was preached by Simeon Ashe, and published, with memorial verses, as The Good Man's Death Lamented, London, 1655.

== Works ==
Besides sermons, Robinson was the author of: Christ all in all, London, 1656; 2nd edit. 1660; 3rd edit. Woolwich, 1828; 4th edit. London, 1868; and Πανοπλία. Universa Arma (Hieron; or the Christian compleatly Armed), London, 1656.

== Sources ==
- This article incorporates text from a publication now in the public domain: "Robinson, Ralph (1614-1655)". Dictionary of National Biography. London: Smith, Elder & Co. 1885–1900.
