= St Nicholas Acons =

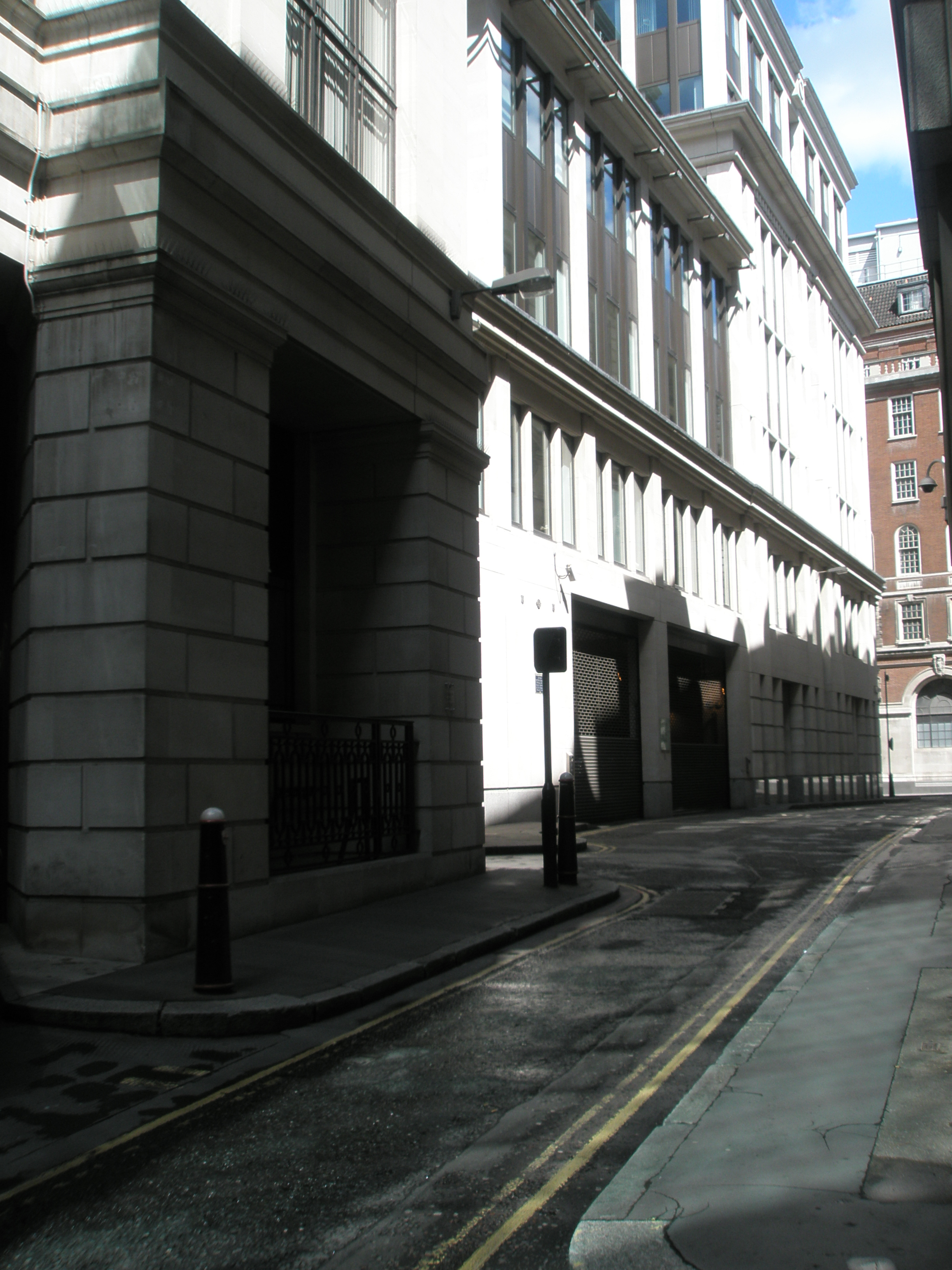
- Current photograph of site
- St Nicholas Acons
- OS grid reference: TQ 32835 80972
- Location: Nicholas Lane, off Lombard Street, London
- Country: England
- Denomination: Anglican

Coordinates: 51°30′43.46″N 0°5′13.68″W St Nicholas Acons was a parish church in the City of London. In existence by the late 11th century, it was destroyed during the Great Fire of London of 1666 and not rebuilt.

== History ==
The church was situated on the west side of Nicholas Lane in Langbourn ward of the City of London. The name 'Acons' was derived from that of a mediaeval benefactor. The church is recorded as early as 1084, when Godwinus and his wife Turund gave its patronage to Malmesbury Abbey in Wiltshire. It passed to the Crown on the dissolution of the monasteries.

St Nicholas' was destroyed during the Great Fire of London of 1666 and not rebuilt. Instead the parish was united with that of St Edmund the King and Martyr, Lombard Street in 1670. The name retained as the name of a precinct in the south-western part of Langbourn Ward.

In the 1860s a proposed unification of the benefice of St Edmunds with St Nicholas and that of St Mary Woolnoth with St Mary Woolchurch Haw was vigorously defended by St Nicholas Acons' discrete churchwardens. In 1964 the churchyard was excavated and important Saxon remains found, but in the last decade of the 20th century Gordon Huelin noted that only a City Corporation commemoration at the site of the old parsonage remained to indicate a church had ever been there.

== Present day ==
The parish now forms part of the combined parish of "St Edmund the King and Martyr, and St Mary Woolnoth Lombard Street with St Nicholas Acons, All Hallows Lombard Street, St Benet Gracechurch, St Leonard Eastcheap, St Dionis Backchurch and St Mary Woolchurch Haw" – usually shortened to 'St Edmund and St Mary Woolnoth'. It is part of the Church of England's Diocese of London.

== Bibliography ==
- "The Register Book of the parish of St. Nicholas Acons, London, 1539–1812" Brigg, W(Transc) p 160: Leeds, Walker & Laycock, 1890.
- Church of England, Parish of St. Nicholas Acons. – PLAN OF THE PARISH OF SAINT NICHOLAS ACON'S LOMBARD STREET 1875 / George Leg, 1875 ms. plan. – k1264830 cited in "City of London Parish Registers Guide 4" Hallows, A. (Ed): London, Guildhall Library Research, 1974 ISBN 0-900422-30-0 .
- "Vanished churches of the City of London", Huelin, G p21 : London Guildhall Library Publishing, 1996 ISBN 0-900422-42-4
- A Descriptive Account of the Guildhall of the City of London-Its History and Associations in "The English Historical Review" Price, J.E. pp. 154–158: Oxford, Oxford University Press Jan., 1888 (Vol. 3, No. 9)
- Stow, John (1890). A Survey of London, Vol I. London: A. Fullarton & Co. Originally published 1598. p. 446.
- The Proposed Union Of City Benefices in "The Times" p 10: London, The Times Newspaper, 1861 (Wednesday, 20 November; Issue 24095; col C)
- Local Administrative Units: Southern England Youngs, F. p. 302 :London, Royal Historical Society, 1979
- "The London Encyclopaedia" Hibbert, C; Weinreb, D; Keay, J: London, Pan Macmillan, 1983 (rev 1993,2008) ISBN 978-1-4050-4924-5
- Newcourt, Richard (1708). "S. Nicolas Acon". Repetorium Ecclesiasticum Parochiale Londinense. London.
