= St Edmund, King and Martyr =

Coordinates: 51°30′44.62″N 0°5′10.68″W

St Edmund King and Martyr
- Church of Saint Edmund the King and Martyr
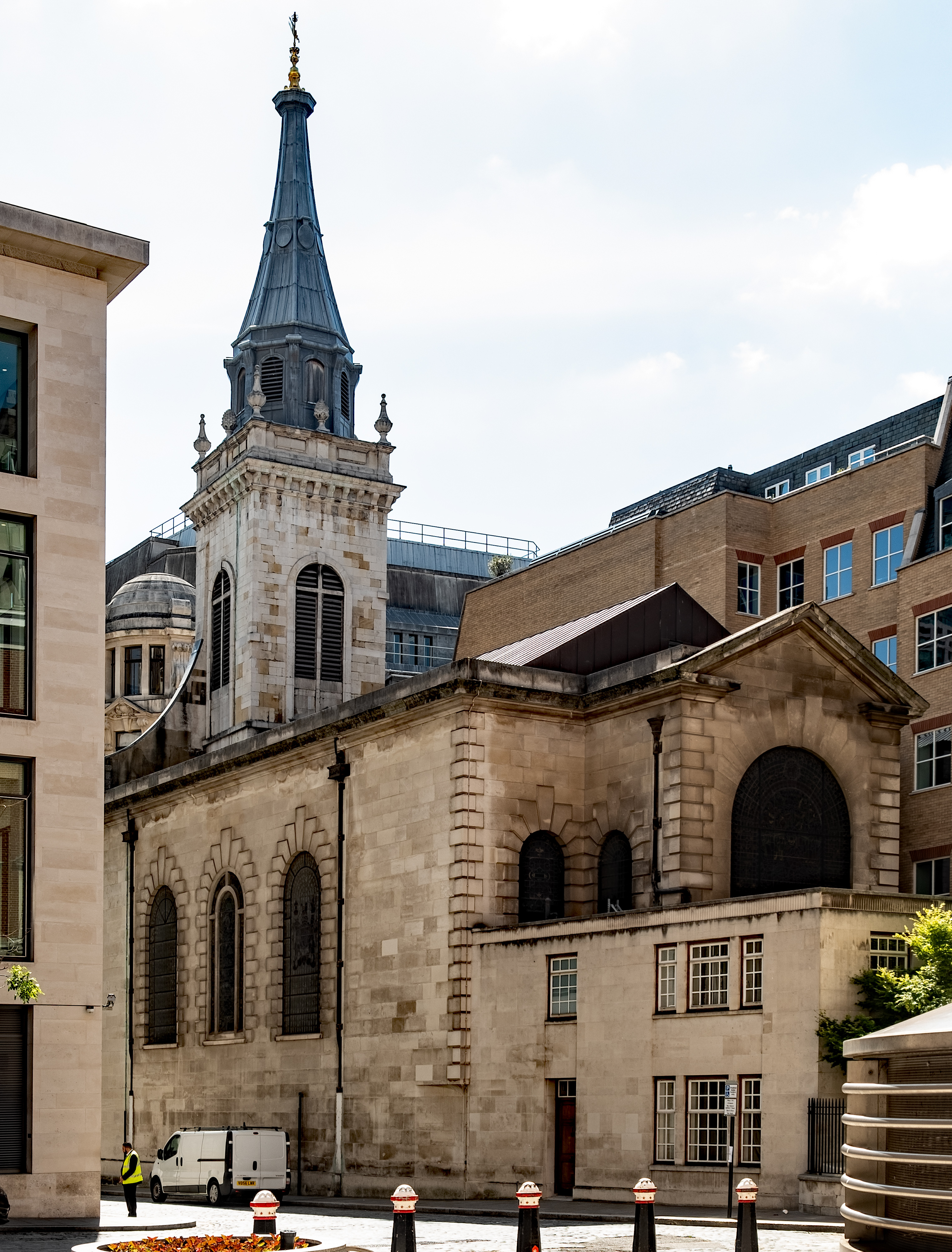

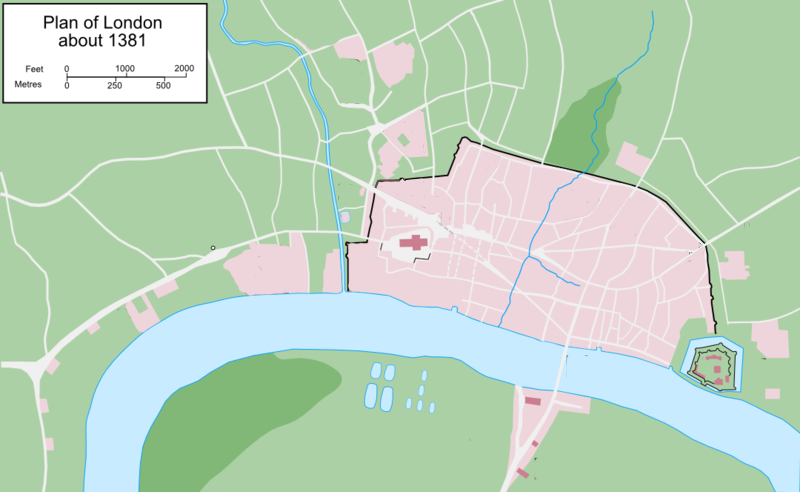
- Location within City of London Location within City of London in 1300
- OS grid reference: TQ 32895 81020
- Location: Lombard Street, London EC3V 9EA
- Country: England
- Language: English
- Denomination: Church of England
- Previous denomination: Roman Catholic (to 1534)
- Website: lombardchurches.org

History
- Founded: 13th century or earlier
- Dedication: Edmund the Martyr

Architecture
- Functional status: Consecrated but no regular worship
- Heritage designation: Grade I
- Architect(s): Robert Hooke and Christopher Wren
- Style: English Baroque

Administration
- Diocese: London
- Archdeaconry: London
- Deanery: City of London
- Parish: St Edmund & St Mary Woolnoth

St Edmund, King and Martyr, is an Anglican church in Lombard Street, in the City of London, dedicated to St Edmund the Martyr (d. AD 869). From 2001 it housed the London Centre for Spirituality, renamed the London Centre for Spiritual Direction, but is still a consecrated church. Since 2019, Imprint Church organises regular worship inside of the building.

The church lies in the ward of Langbourn, and has a ward noticeboard outside.

== History ==
In 1292, the church is first recorded as 'Saint Edmund towards Garcherche', and it reappears in 1348 as 'Saint Edmund in Lombardestrete'. John Stow, in his Survey of London 1598, revised during 1603, refers to it also as St Edmund Grass Church, because the grass market (a place where hay, grass and seeds were sold) came up to the church.

The medieval church was destroyed in the Great Fire of 1666. After the fire the parish was united with that of St Nicholas Acons, which was also destroyed and not rebuilt. The present church was constructed to the designs of Robert Hooke (signed off by Sir Christopher Wren) in 1670–1679, with a tower ornamented at the angles by flaming urns in allusion to the Great Fire. George Godwin described the tower as "more Chinese than Italian", while James Peller Malcolm called it "rather handsome, but of that species of architecture which is difficult to describe so as to be understood". The orientation of the church is unusual, with the altar towards the north, instead of east.

The essayist Joseph Addison was married here in 1716.

Edmund Wood (1830-1909), a priest who founded Church of St. John the Evangelist, Montreal, which was Canada's first Anglo-Catholic parish, was baptized in this church in 1830.

In September 1868 a riot occurred outside the church, as a consequence of one of a series of Friday morning sermons given by the Rev. J. L. Lyne – known as "Father Ignatius" – in which he had spoken disparagingly of the traders of Lombard Street.

The church was restored in 1864 and 1880. On 7 July 1917, during the second daylight air raid by Gotha bombers of the England Squadron, a high explosive bomb landed on St Edmund's, destroying the main beam of the roof; extensive repair and restoration was required and it did not reopen until 1 October 1919. Some fragments of the German bomb are preserved in the church. Further damage was caused by incendiary bombs during the 1941 London Blitz.

The church was designated a Grade I listed building on 4 January 1950.

== Previous rectors ==
Rectors of the church have included Thomas Lyndford, chaplain in ordinary to George I, and Jeremiah Milles, president of the Society of Antiquaries. After the Great War, Studdert Kennedy was given charge of St Edmund, King and Martyr. He moved to work for the Industrial Christian Fellowship, for whom he went on speaking tours of Britain. It was on one of these tours that he was taken ill. He died in Liverpool in 1929, exhausted at the age of 45, and poor people flocked to his funeral in Worcester, for the Dean of Westminster refused burial at the Abbey because, he said, Studdert Kennedy was a "socialist".

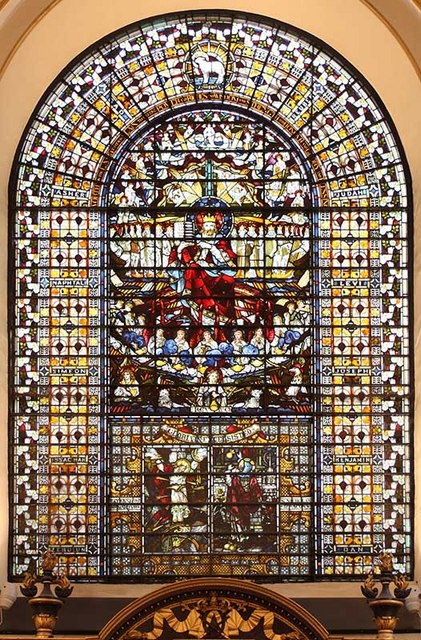
Great east window

== Present day ==
The church and parish now forms part of the combined parish of St Edmund the King and Martyr, and St Mary Woolnoth Lombard Street with St Nicholas Acons, All Hallows Lombard Street, St Benet Gracechurch, St Leonard Eastcheap, St Dionis Backchurch and St Mary Woolchurch Haw – usually shortened to "St Edmund & St Mary Woolnoth" (the only two aforementioned churches to have survived). It is part of the Church of England's Diocese of London. and accommodates the office of the Bishop of Islington.

== Gallery ==
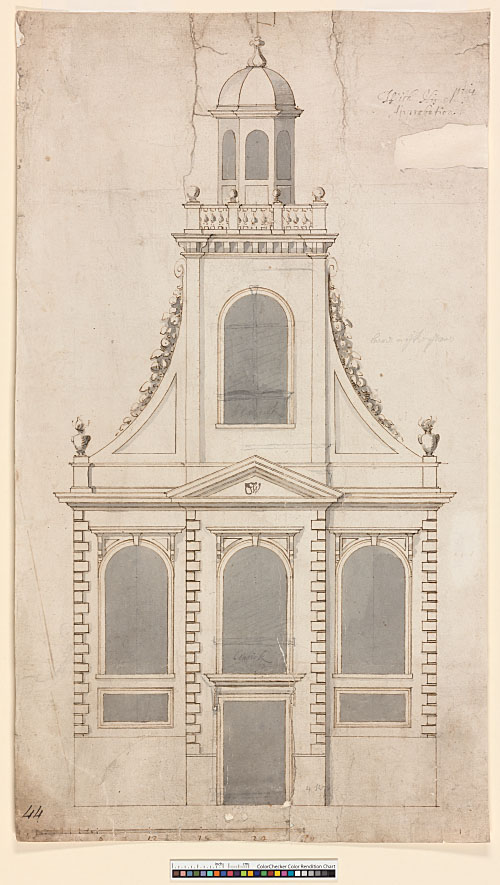
Original architectural design by Wren

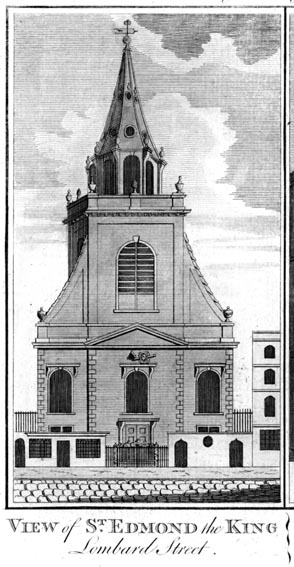
Historic engraving

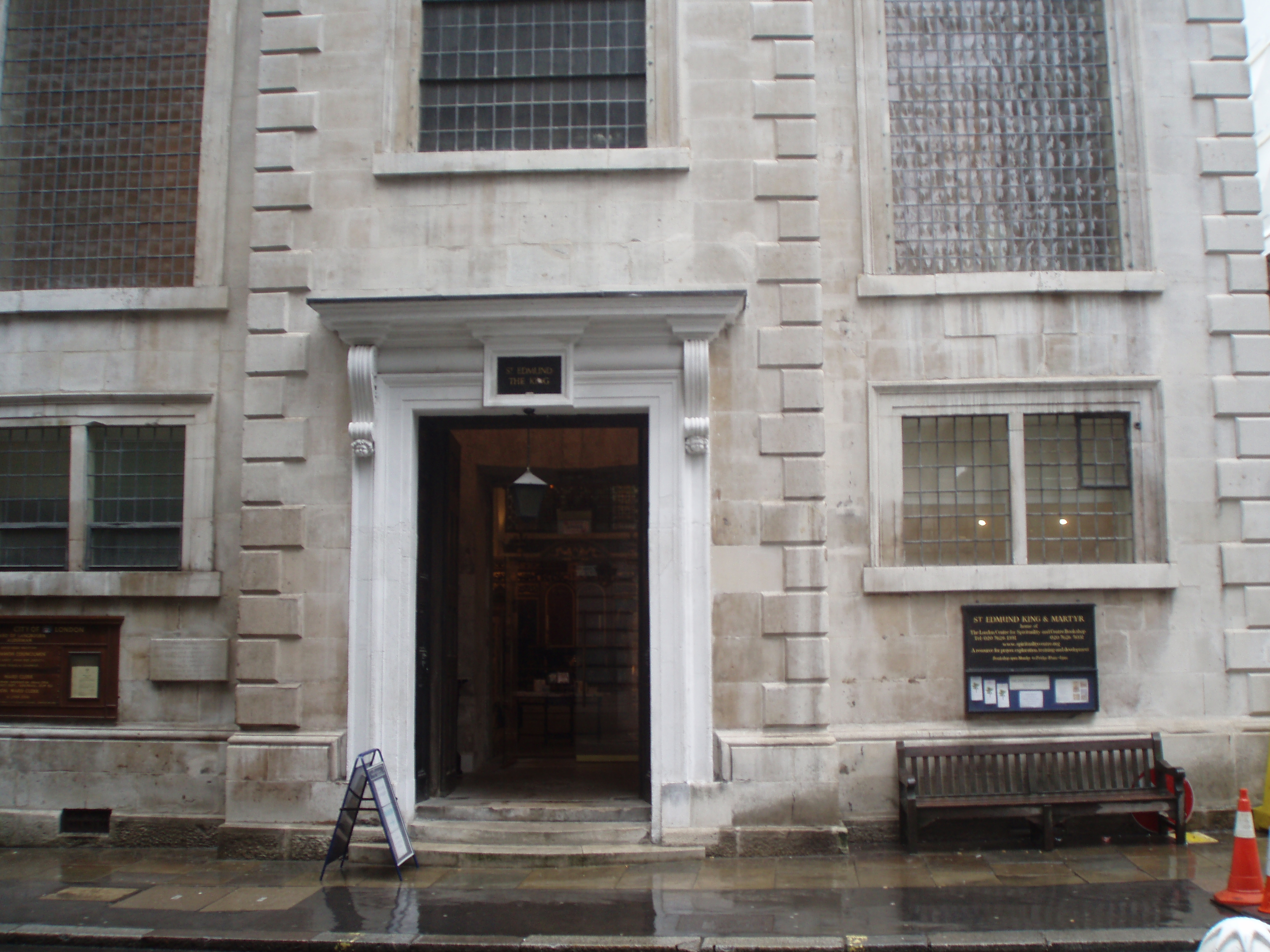
Now a Centre for Spirituality

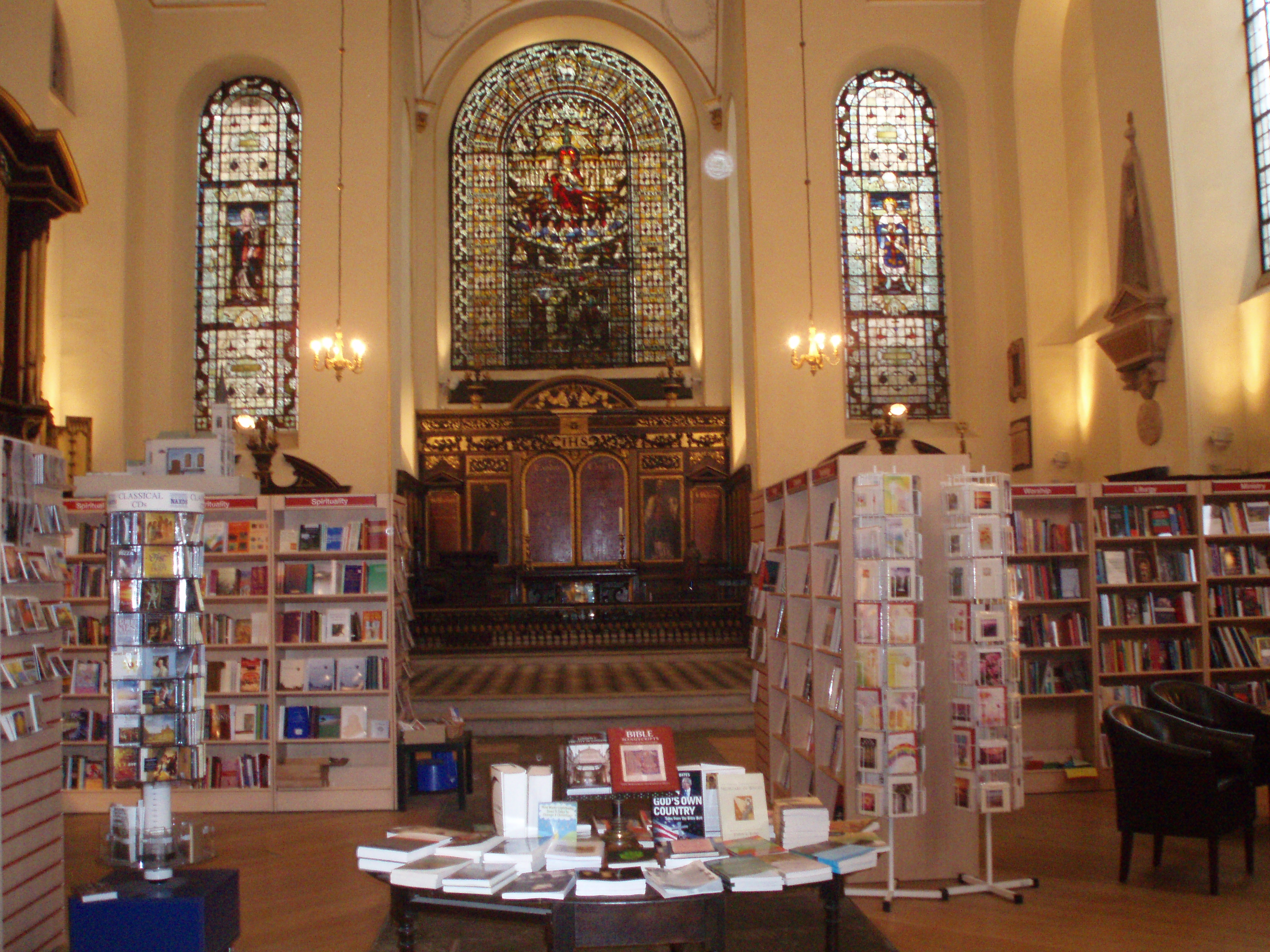
Interior

== See also ==
- List of Christopher Wren churches in London
