= Edward Sparke =

Edward Sparke (c. 1610/11 – 1692) was an orthodox Anglican English clergyman and devotional writer in prose and poetry, who despite being ejected from his living during the English Rebellion survived to see his work and teaching gain a wide currency during the Restoration period. He is most remembered as the author of Scintilla Altaris, first published in 1652. It was a major influence in re-establishing the Anglican liturgical calendar.

== Life ==
A native of Kent, he was educated at Clare Hall, Cambridge, graduating with a bachelor's degree in 1630, a master's in 1633, and a doctorate in 1640. He was incorporated at Oxford on 12 July 1653 and later obtained the doctorate in divinity.

He was presented to the rectory of St Martin, Ironmonger Lane (St Martin Pomeroy), London, 28 September 1639. At about this time he took a wife Sarah, for on 16 September 1641 their daughter Sarah was baptized at St Martin Pomeroy. The mother died in childbirth: the baptism and the burial took place on the same day. Daughter Sarah survived and bore her father's only known posterity.

Sparke was at the same time an assistant governor, under James Marsh as president, of Sion College on London Wall, when John Sedgwick of St Alphage London Wall sought to have them removed as Royalists and replaced with men of parliamentarian sympathy. This was achieved by an assembly of deans, assistants and fellows which met on 21 October 1643 to elect their replacements. He was soon ejected from St Martin's, and his church sequestered, about 1645, making way for the appointment there of John Arrowmith (1602–1659), a puritan sympathist, of the Sixth London Presbyterian Classis.

His association as preacher or minister with St James's, Clerkenwell, appears to have begun by 1654, when he was approached to officiate while an election was arranged in the following year. The parishioners soon afterwards purchased the church. Sparke maintained this connection with Clerkenwell in 1660, as an Independent, sharing, or in rivalry, with the elected minister Dr Siddon. At the English Restoration of 1660 he regained his rectory of St Martin's, but resigned it before 5 June 1661.

In September 1661 he obtained a mortgage for £400 to Peter Calfe of Tottenham in respect of Calfe's mansion house (that built by Sir Richard Martin on the south side of Sir Julius Caesar's property) which Calfe had acquired in 1654. Indentures of Fine were prepared between them in 1662, and in March 1664 a year's lease, and release, were made by them jointly with Sir Theodore Devaux of Covent Garden. A bill and answer were exchanged between the parties in Chancery in 1667. Sparke was also involved in a land transaction at Rolvenden in Kent in 1664. During the same period he was vicar of Walthamstow, December 1662 to May 1666, and became chaplain to King Charles II. He resigned from Clerkenwell in 1666, and on 23 January 1665/66 was instituted to the vicarage of Tottenham at All Hallows, Tottenham High Cross, which he held until his death.

== Works ==
In January 1637/38, Sparke published a sermon of 44 pages for the funeral of Henry Chitting, Chester Herald, entitled The Christian's Map of the World. At this time he was preacher of St Mary, Islington.

In 1649 he published his own edition, in nineteen sermons, from the manuscripts of Josias Shute (died 1643), of Sarah and Hagar, or, Genesis the sixteenth chapter opened in XIX sermons. The portrait of Josias Shute which is prefixed to the edition was engraved by William Marshall, and the verses (both Latin and English) which are inscribed beneath it are subscribed "Ed. Sparke". He wrote the epistle dedicatory from his study in London on 11 November 1648, dedicating it to John Lord Viscount Brackley and to Thomas Vyner, then one of the sheriffs of London, signing himself "the least Spark on God's Altar." The title-page describes him as Rector of St Martin's, Ironmonger Lane. A further edition appeared in 1669 (Peter Parker, London).

=== Scintilla Altaris ===
His very lasting work, which had its first edition in 1652, was Scintillula Altaris, or a Pious Reflection on Primitive Devotion: as to the Feasts and Fasts of the Christian Church orthodoxally Revived (T. Maxey for Richard Marriot, London). ("Scintilla" in Latin means "spark".) This consisted of a series of disquisitions or meditations on the principal feasts, together with original religious poetry in each section, and extensive prayers for each feast. It also featured a series of engraved illustrations derived (at some removes) from, or reinvented after, engravings by Collaert after Marten de Vos.

This fourfold method of exposition addressed a metaphysical principle in his teaching, as when, in his second disquisition (upon Advent Sunday), he described the four Sundays of Advent, as "may in some sense (like the Four Evangelists) be called our Saviour's four-wheel'd Chariot (Quadriga Domini), carrying the glad and sad tydings of his approach throughout the Church, as those do his Mercy and Justice throughout the world." The four Sundays (he writes) correspond to the four ways in which Christ comes to us, that is, the Corporeal, Ministerial, Spiritual and Judicial ways. A brief extract from his poem on this feast illustrates his richly figurative style:

"His Ministerial-Advent next attend,
And in his Word, each Grief shall finde a Friend.
The Motions of his Spirit, are the Gales,
That, while we steer towards Heav'n, will fill our Sails;
His blessed Sacraments, the Churches Wings,
Whereby each Lark of Heaven mounts, and sings:
A pair of cleansing Streams, broach'd from the side
Of our dear Lord, when for us crucifi'd,
Our Brace of Spies, that from blest Can'an brings
News of her chearing Vines, and fruitfull Springs."

Although the words "Primitive Devotion" suggested the paring away of ceremonial, Sparke expound anew the Anglican Calendar of observances which had been thrown out the preceding decade. As an appeal to the former orthodoxy it was therefore a daring publication for 1652. His friend Isaac Walton wrote commendatory verses upon seeing the first leaf printed from the Marriots's press (John Donne's publisher at that time), expressing strong approval that the poems, prayers and expositions so long-awaited were now being made available in print, as if in payment of a debt. Walton's verse appeared only in the first edition.

The second edition, published in 1660, was entitled Θυσιαστήριον, vel Scintilla Altaris ("Thysiasterion, or, the Spark of the Altar"), and with a new dedication to King Charles II, and a collection of poems by notable persons approving the author's steadfastness to the old order in the face of the intervening chaos, was at once esteemed both for its orthodoxy and for the sinewy strength, depth and clarity of its expositions. Six further editions appeared between 1663 and 1700. Thomas Fuller and Alexander Brome were among the authors of the prefatory verses.

In 1666 Sparke added a supplementary work providing materials for the three "Grand Solemnities" of 5 November (the deliverance of King James I and the three estates by the failure of the Gunpowder Plot, 1605), 30 January (The martyrdom of King Charles I, 1649), and 29 May (the restitution of the king and royal family after the Great Rebellion, 1660). This was usually incorporated into later editions of the Scintilla.

== Family ==
Sparke's will, written on 2 May 1693, gives various details of his family. He had a brother Thomas Sparke who married and had an only daughter Martha Sparke, but Thomas died before Edward. He also had a niece named Elizabeth Blyth.

It appears that he first married Sarah, by whom he had his daughter, at the same time losing his wife who died at the time of the birth:

- Sarah Sparke (baptized St Martin Pomeroy, 16 September 1641). She married Mathew Lyster (Consul at Cyprus for the Levant Company, 1656–1667), who dwelt at Old Ford, Middlesex, and had four daughters, Sarah, Mary, Frances and Martha Lister. Matthew and Sarah were the executors of Edward Sparke's will, which was proved on 25 September 1693.

Sarah having died, there must then have been a second marriage, since in 1650 he had a son:

- Edward Sparke (born 17 June 1650). Edward, of Kent, attended Merchant Taylor's School in the City of London under headmaster John Goad, and became Head Scholar in 1666. He then matriculated at St John's College, Oxford, on 19 October 1666, aged 16, and with a B.C.L. and LL.B. became a fellow of the college in 1673 and S.T.P., but died on 30 November 1675 and was buried in the college chapel. According to Anthony à Wood, he "soon after had a comely mon[ument] set over his grave by his father." The Latin and Greek inscriptions of the monument itself (in the ante-chapel) and on a marble slab set in the floor beneath it confirm that he was the son and "unica spes" (only hope) of Edward Sparke, D.D., "Maestissimus", and there is much play on the "Scintilla" theme. These can be read in John Le Neve's collection.

At the time of making his will, aged 87, his wife's name was Ruth Sparke, who survived him. Edward settled money for her in the hands of Trustees of her own choosing, and left her the annual rents from his houses in Wapping for her lifetime, unless she remarried, after which they should revert to Sarah and Matthew Lister. Bequests were made to his grandchildren. If his wife contested any aspect of his will, she was to have nothing but the household goods. Edward Sparke also made bequests of money out of three assignments of mortgage made to him under the hands and seals of Sir Robert Vyner, Bart., Edward Backwell, Esq., and Gilbert Whitehall, citizen and Goldsmith of London (moneylenders to the Crown). A receipt on such an assignment between Vyner and Sparke, dated 1679, is illustrated in a modern Catalogue of Sale, and shows Sparke's signature.

Altogether Edward Sparke seems to have kept his financial and property affairs in good order, though the sums referred to are not especially large. The will also names his kinsman Gabriel Sparke, a brewer, as one of his overseers.

== Portraits and heraldry ==
The 1662 edition of Scintilla Altaris contained an engraved portrait by Abraham Hertochs, set within a cartouche bearing the legend: "Edoardus Sparke S T D Regi a Sacris. Ano Domni 1662". Beneath is inscribed the following verse:

"This but the Case; the Jewell further Looke
The Sparke indeed the Di'mond's in his Booke
Wherewith Adorne thy Soule, until it Shine
With Grace and Glory like these Sparkes divine"

The portrait was replaced by another in the later editions, commencing 1666, the framing and inscription the same apart from the date. Hertochs's name is removed, and the engraver of the second likeness is named by Granger as Robert White.

Both versions display a shield of arms and a crest for Sparke, which seem to correspond to Bernard Burke's blazon, Chequy or and vert, a bend ermine, with crest Out of a ducal coronet or, a demi panther rampant guardant argent spotted with various colours, fire issuing from the ears and mouth proper. Burke lists these arms with this crest for the Sparke families of Nantwich, Cheshire (including the Plympton, Devon descent); of London and Essex (1577); and of Gunthorpe Hall, Norfolk; and also for Sparkes of Pennyworlodd Hall, Brecon and for Sparks of Byfleet, Surrey, formerly of Wexford, Ireland. The fire issuing from the demi-panther's ears, presumably alluding to 'Spark', is conspicuous in the engraved portrait.

== Monument ==
Both the churches of St Martin Iremonger Lane (St Martin Pomeroy) and St Olave Old Jewry (which were adjacent) were destroyed in the Great Fire of London of 1666, after which St Olave's church (only) was rebuilt by Sir Christopher Wren's office, and the parish of St Martin was annexed to it. Sparke, in his will (dated 2 May 1693), stated his wish to be buried at St Olave's, but on the site of the former chancel of the lost church of St Martin. (Possibly he wished to be near the burial place of his first wife, and the place of his former rectorate.) The grave was to be bricked up on both sides, and a fair black marble stone was to be laid at the top over it.

The parish register of St Martin's (which continued to be kept) records Sparke's burial as follows: "Dr Edward Spark Vicar of Totnham High Cross was buryed Sep: ye 21 1693." To this is added, in a later hand: "formerly vicar of St Martin I[ronmonger] L[ane] to whose memory a stone had been erected - which in [....] was found buried at some depth I replaced (with an inscription which I added) at the expence of the Parishes. R. Hamilton, Rector. See Walker's sufferings of the clergy. V[ide] some books written by Sparke in Sion Library."

The date of the rediscovery of the original stone is left blank in the register, but Robert Hamilton (c. 1751–1832) was inducted to St Olave's in 1797 and was elected President of Sion College, London Wall, in 1817. Memorial inscriptions at St Olave's were recorded and printed by F.A. Crisp in 1887. He saw the inscription positioned on the outside south wall of St Olave's church tower, and it read:

"Hoc marmor sacrum est memoriae Edoardi Sparke S.T.P. tam doctrina quam ingenio celeberrimi olim rectoris huius parochiae qui obijt xiij die Sept. Ann Dom MDCLXXXXIII aetat suae LXXXVII."
(This stone is dedicated to the memory of Edward Sparke, Doctor of Sacred Theology, formerly by teaching and genius the very famous rector of this parish, who died on 13 September 1693 aged 87.)

By 1910 the stone had been removed to St Margaret, Lothbury, where it is described as a flat stone "in the ground around the church".
