= City of London Cemetery and Crematorium =

Cemetery and crematorium in the north east of London, England

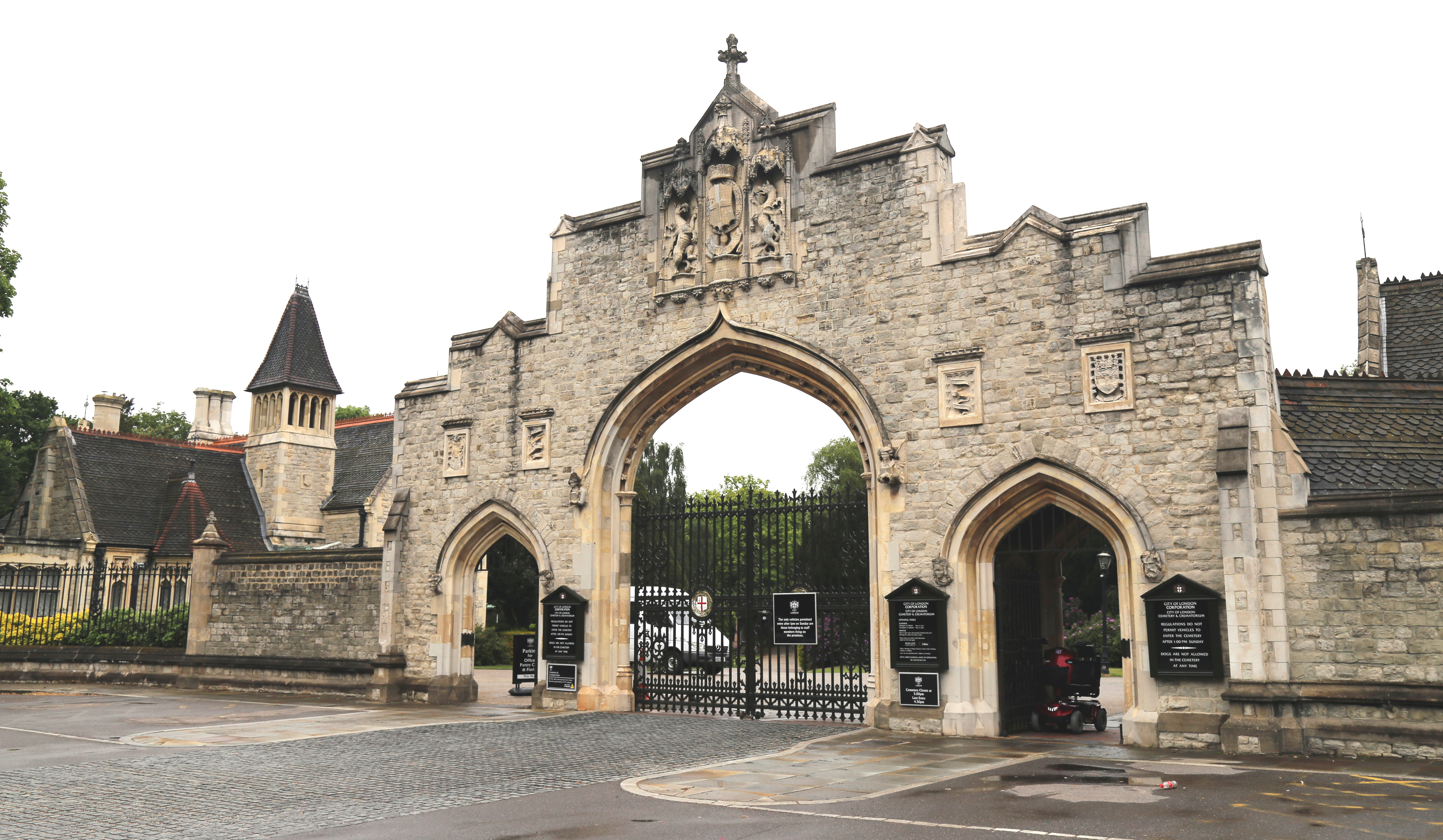
- The main gate
- Interactive map of City of London Cemetery and Crematorium

Details
- Established: 1856; 170 years ago
- Location: Aldersbrook Road, Newham, London, E12 5DQ
- Country: England
- Coordinates: 51.55782°N 0.04432°E
- Type: Public
- Size: 200 acres (81 ha)
- No. of graves: 150,000+
- No. of interments: approaching 1 million
- Website: Official website
- Find a Grave: City of London Cemetery and Crematorium

The City of London Cemetery and Crematorium is a cemetery and crematorium in Manor Park, London. It is owned and operated by the City of London Corporation. It is designated Grade I on the Historic England National Register of Historic Parks and Gardens.

Anyone can be interred at the City of London Cemetery irrespective of city connections or religious beliefs. The cemetery reuses graves which have not been used for more than 75 years, and which are known to have depth for at least two more burials. English Heritage has listed many burial grounds and says it has no objection to the reuse of graves in principle, as long as heritage is protected.

== Location ==
The cemetery is on the north-east side of Aldersbrook Road, in Manor Park, in the London Borough of Newham, near Epping Forest. It has two entrances: the Main Gate, close to the junction of Aldersbrook Road and Forest Drive; and the South Gate, a small gate at the junction of Aldersbrook Road and Rabbits Road.

== History ==
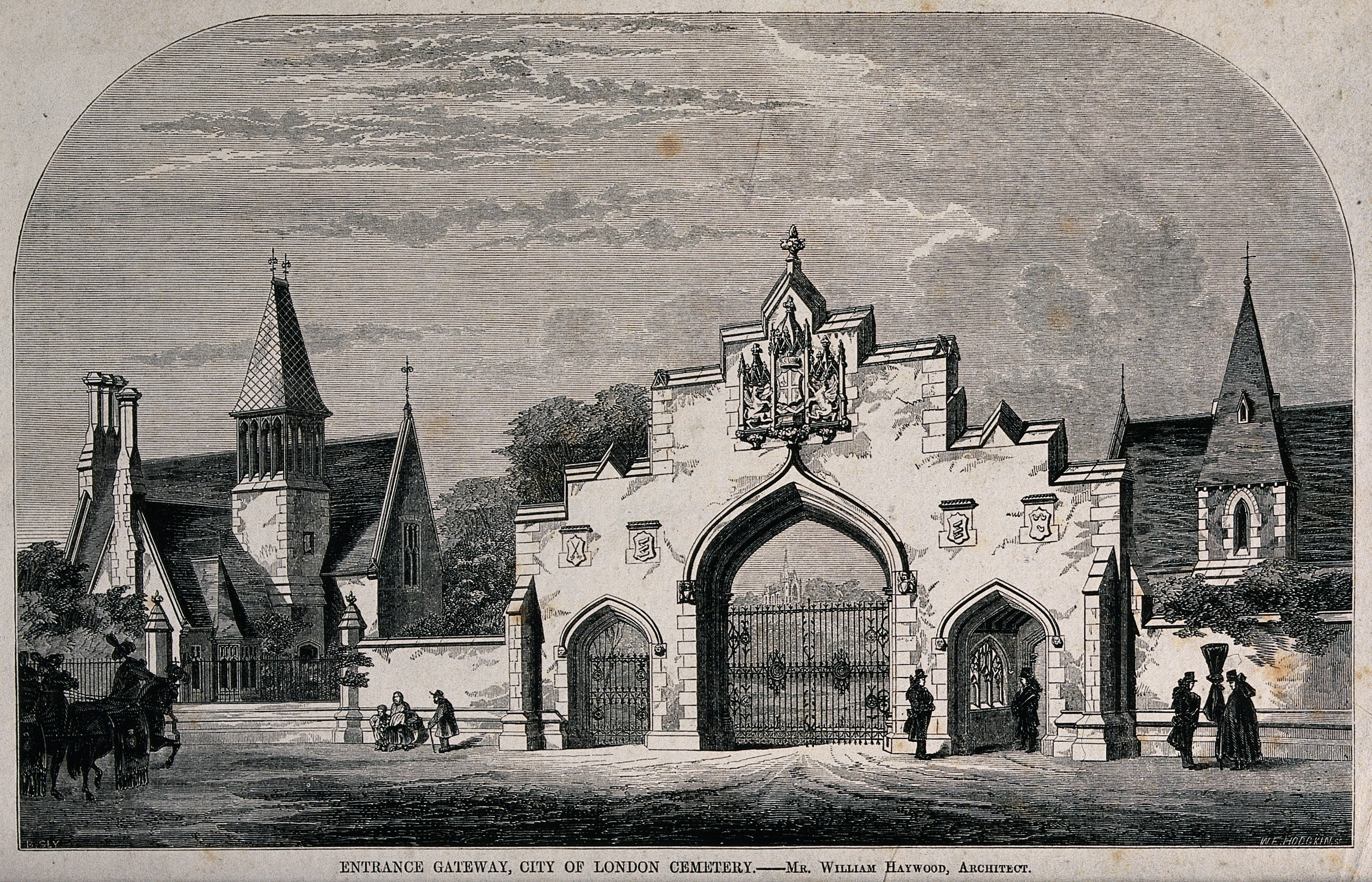
19th-century wood-engraving of the cemetery gate

In 1849 William J. Haywood, Chief Engineer of the Commissioners of Sewers of the City of London, reported on the condition of the city's churchyards and their health risks. The commissioners were responsible for public hygiene and sanitation and were in effect also the burial board for the City of London, due to section 43 of the Burial Act 1852 (15 & 16 Vict. c. 85). The commissioners directed that a cemetery be built for the city's 106 parishes, to replace intramural interment (burial within the confines of a parish). The task was taken up by William Haywood and Dr John Simon.

In 1853 this led to the purchase of land owned by the 2nd Duke of Wellington, forming most of the Manor of Aldersbrook. The 200 acres (0.81 km^{2}) of land suited the construction of the cemetery because it was accessible—only 7 miles (11 km) from the City of London—and had attractive planting and porous, gravelly, well-drained soil. This former farm land was sold to the Corporation for £30,721 and the cemetery was founded in 1854. It was laid out in 1855 by William Haywood, who designated 89 acres (360,000 m^{2}) for burial but also reserved land for plots sold in perpetuity, buildings, landscaping and roads. He was helped by landscape gardener Robert Davidson. In selecting planting, Haywood and Simon were guided by John Claudius Loudon's On the Laying Out, Planting, and Managing of Cemeteries (1843). The total cost is estimated at over £45,000, which is approximately £26,000 more than originally planned.

The first interment was on 24 June 1856, although the cemetery was not consecrated until November 1857, due to legal difficulties (which were solved in the Burial Act 1857). It is estimated that in 1858 around 2,700 interments took place. Approximately 600,000 people have been interred here and with the remains from over 30 London churchyards also placed on the site, the figure is approaching 1 million.

At the beginning of the 20th century a crematorium was built (designed by D. J. Ross), at a cost of around £7,000 and was opened on 25 October 1904 in the presence of Sir Henry Thompson. In 1937 a garden of rest was constructed, followed by a series of memorial gardens, today with an estimated 20,000 rose bushes. A new crematorium was built in 1971 to a design by E. G. Chandler. It is a modern, symmetrical building containing two chapels and a basement crematory.

The cemetery has been in continuous use since its opening. Many of the churches that were demolished in London had their dead reinterred in the City of London Cemetery (see § Reburial and memorials).

=== Importance ===
The cemetery grounds have been listed Grade I on the Historic England National Register of Parks and Gardens. Eight Grade II listed buildings on the National Heritage List for England are also associated with the cemetery, these are the Main Entrance Screen and Lodges, the Non Conformist Mortuary Chapel, the Columbarium, the Monument at the South End of the Columbarium and Non Conformist Chapel, the monument to William Haywood, the cottage, and the Central Avenue chapel and the South Chapel

== Facilities ==
City of London Cemetery and Crematorium, which has received the Green Flag Award, is open 365 days a year and contains formal gardens, roadways, and over 3,500 mature trees in a rolling landscape. It has uniformed information staff, a florist shop and a café with its own garden.

The cemetery has different burial sites, an Anglican Chapel with a 61 ft (19 m) spire, and a round Dissenter's Chapel (designed by William Haywood), although the cemetery and crematorium is today non-denominational. There are now two crematoria, designated the Old and the New. The Old Crematorium is no longer in use as a crematorium but is used as a chapel. There is also a chapel of remembrance and a columbarium. The cemetery is one of only a few cemeteries in London with catacombs. This however has proven to be an unpopular method of burial; part of the unused catacombs have now been converted into columbarium space.

Despite having over 150,000 gravesites the cemetery is reaching capacity. New burials have begun to be placed above older burials, leaving deep interments undisturbed. These new burials involve advice from experts, and the family of the previously buried if known.

There are 729 identified Commonwealth service personnel of the First and Second World Wars commemorated at the cemetery, many buried in a War Graves plot, which has a Cross of Sacrifice and a Screen Wall memorial that lists casualties who are buried in the plot or elsewhere in the cemetery without headstones, and those cremated at the City of London Crematorium. Many of the soldiers died at the Bethnal Green Military Hospital.

The Cemetery provides a car park, but allows vehicle permissive access to cemetery roads. It is served by National Rail and London Underground stations, and London Transport buses.

== Reburial and memorials ==
The Union of Benefices Act 1860 allowed for the demolition of many unused City churches, and for the reinterment of the human remains in the City of London Cemetery. The cemetery also contains inhumations from London churches destroyed during the Blitz.

- St Benet Gracechurch (1865)
- All Hallows Staining (1870)
- St Andrew and St Sepulchre (1871), this Grade II listed grand monument was designed by Haywood
- St Mary Somerset (1871)
- Holy Trinity the Less (1872)
- St Mildred, Poultry, the church was demolished in 1872, the parish was joined with St Olave Old Jewry
- St James Duke's Place (1874)
- St Martin Outwich (1874)
- St Antholin, Watling Street (1875)
- All Hallows Bread Street (1878)
- St Dionis Backchurch (1878)
- St Matthew Friday Street (1884)
- St Olave Old Jewry (1887)
- St Helen's Bishopsgate (1892)
- St Mary Magdalen Old Fish Street, destroyed by a fire in 1886 and demolished in 1893
- St Mary Woolnoth (between 1897–1900), the contents of the crypt were moved here because of the construction of the Bank Station under the church.
- St Peter le Poer, the church was demolished in 1907, the parish was joined with St Michael, Cornhill
- St Alphage London Wall (1924)
- St Katherine Coleman (1925)
- All Hallows Lombard Street (1939)
- Holy Trinity, Minories (1940)
- St Alban, Wood Street (1940)
- St Mary Aldermanbury (1940), the church was rebuilt in Fulton, Missouri, US, in 1966
- St Botolph's Aldgate, the remains of around 2,500 persons were moved here when the north part of the churchyard was cleared in 1965
- St Michael Queenhithe, the church was demolished in 1876, reinterment took place in 1969
- St Michael, Cornhill, reinterment from the churchyard (date unknown)

Some churches were destroyed in the Great Fire of London in 1666 and never rebuilt due to the Rebuilding Act. Many were joined with other parishes. The remains in their churchyards were either left, moved to a new location or to this cemetery (sometimes at a later date). Among these were:

- St Dionis Backchurch
- St John the Evangelist, Watling Street, the churchyard was cleared in 1954
- St John Zachary
- St Leonard, Eastcheap, the churchyard on Fish Street Hill was cleared in 1882
- St Martin Pomary
- St Martin Vintry
- St Mary Colechurch
- St Mary Woolchurch Haw, the churchyard was cleared in 1892
- St Peter, Paul's Wharf

== Notable burials and cremations ==
- Tony Banks, Baron Stratford, British Labour Party politician (cremated)
- Michael Barrett, a Fenian
- Sir George Barclay, British diplomat
- Robert Bentley and Charles Tucker, City of London policemen and victims of the Battle of Stepney
- Clive Burr (1957-2013), British musician and drummer with the band Iron Maiden (1979-1982) (cremated)
- Paul Di'anno (1958-2024), British singer with the band Iron Maiden (1978-1981)
- George Leslie Drewry VC, British sailor in the Royal Navy Reserve, accidentally killed at Scapa Flow 1918
- George Dyer, lover and muse of Irish-born British artist, Francis Bacon
- Catherine Eddowes, (1842–1888) Whitechapel murder victim of Jack the Ripper
- George William Foote, a secularist and journal editor (cremated)
- Benjamin Gardner, Labour MP
- William Haywood, civil engineer
- Alfred Horsley Hinton, a pictorialist photographer
- Robert Hunter (encyclopædist)
- Elwyn Jones, Baron Elwyn-Jones, a British barrister and Labour politician
- Rev Alexander McCaul, professor of Divinity and Ecclesiastical History at London University
- (John) Joseph Merrick, the "Elephant Man" (soft tissue only)
- Bobby Moore, footballer, cremated at Putney Vale Crematorium; his ashes in the Garden of Remembrance
- Dame Anna Neagle, a popular English stage and motion picture actress, dancer and singer. Widow of Herbert Wilcox
- Mary Ann Nichols (1845–1888), victim of Jack the Ripper
- Sir James Roll, Lord Mayor of London
- John Joseph Sims, VC (died 1881), British foot Soldier
- Rev Thomas Bowman Stephenson, founder of the National Children's Homes
- Edith Thompson (1893–1923), hanged for the murder of her husband (see below). Exhumed from Brookwood Cemetery in 2018 and reburied with her parents.
- Percy Thompson (died 1922), murder victim; see Edith Thompson and Frederick Bywaters
- Christopher Wicking, screenwriter
- Herbert Wilcox, a British film director and producer of films such as The Courtneys of Curzon Street and Odette
- Sir Walter Wilkin (1842–1922), Lord Mayor of London 1895–96

People reputed to have been reinterred here:

- Claude Duval (1643–1670), highwayman, although he was originally buried in St Paul's, Covent Garden
- Robert Hooke (1635–1703), scientist, although was originally buried in St Helen's Bishopsgate

== Size ==
It is the third largest such municipal facility in the United Kingdom. Roselawn Cemetery in Belfast, with approximately 280 acres (113 ha) in surface area, is considered the largest. Brookwood Cemetery, which was privately owned until purchased by Woking Borough Council in 2014 is larger than the City of London Cemetery by surface area at 220 acres (89.0 ha)

== Gallery ==
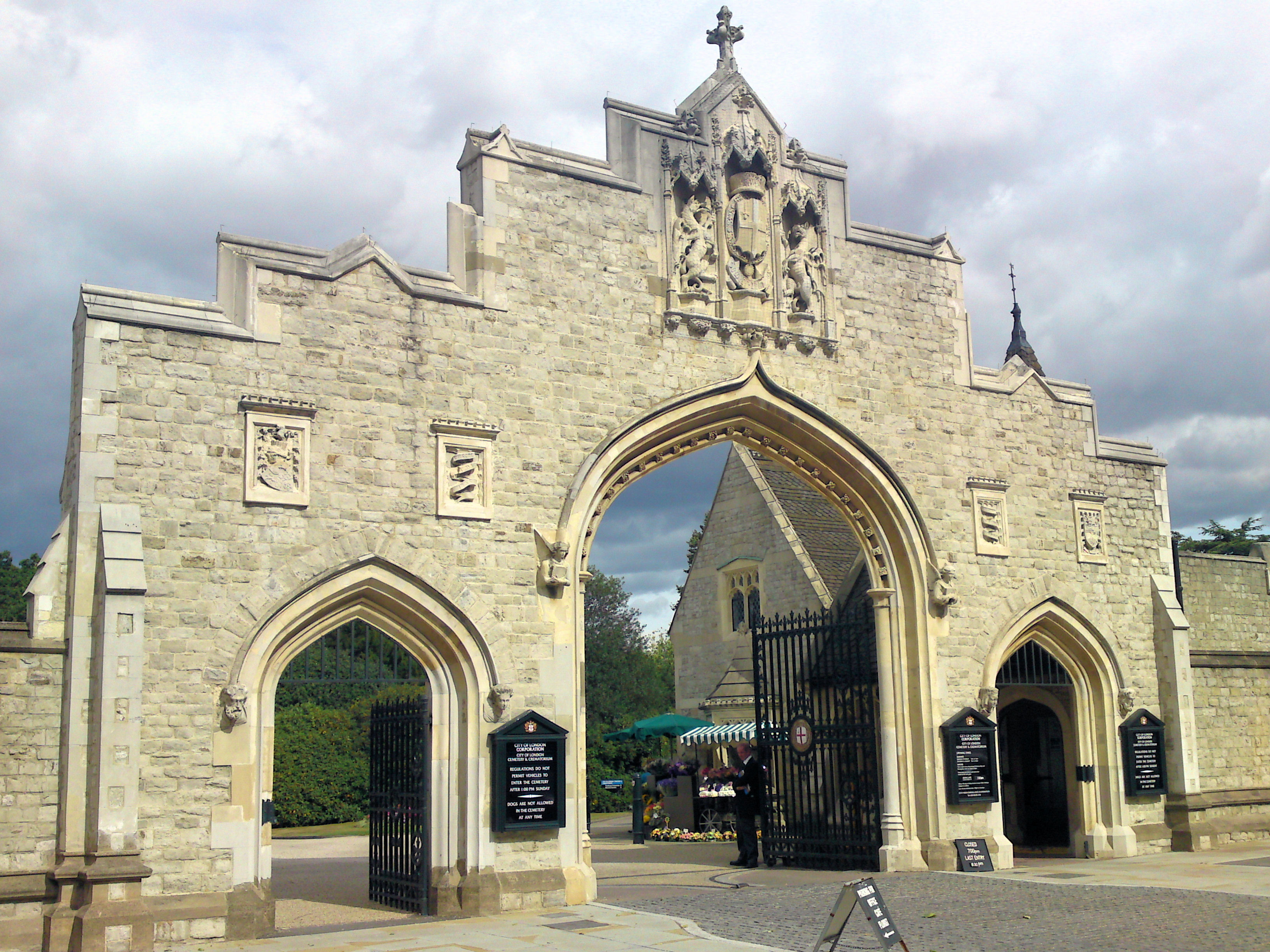
Cemetery gates

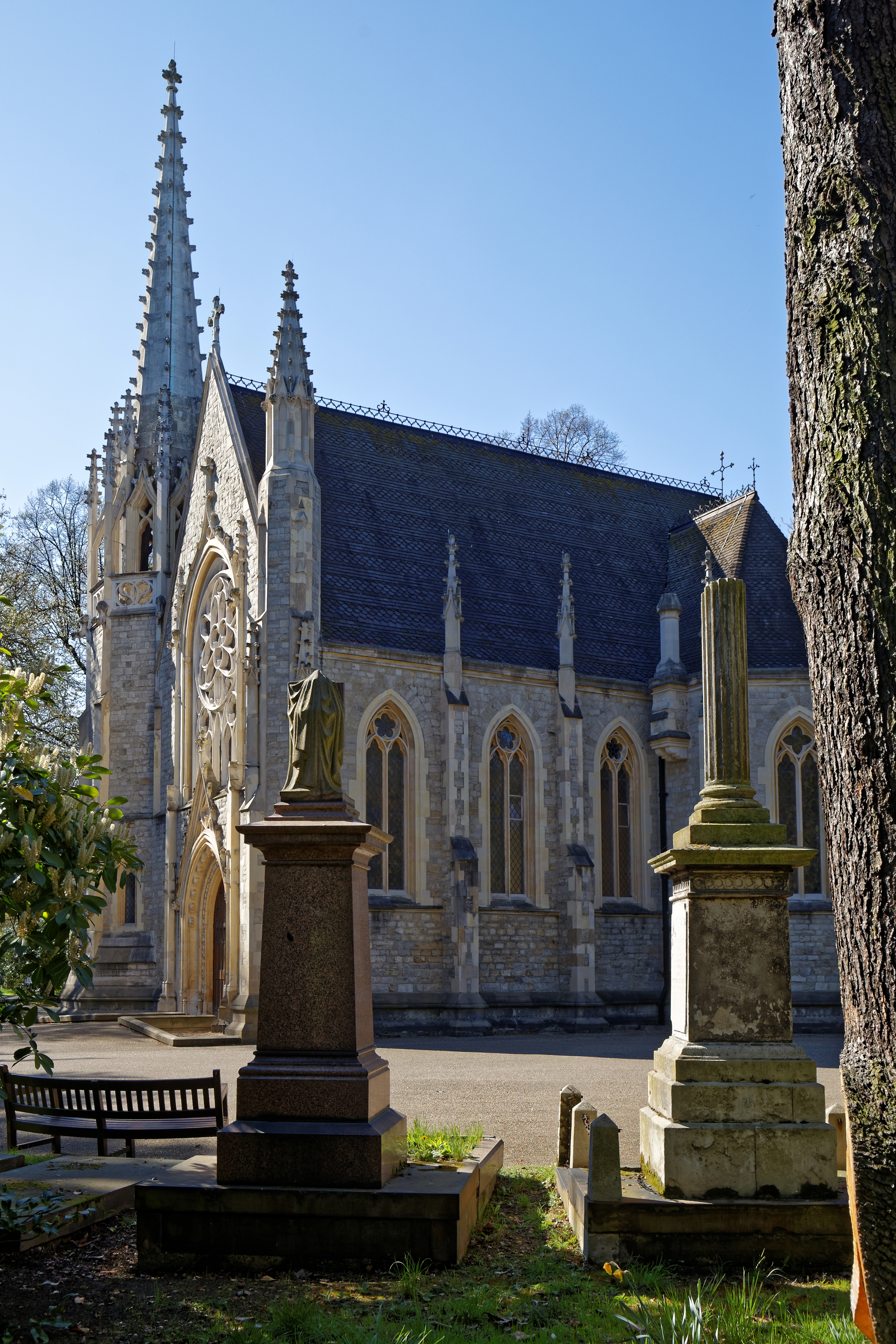
Anglican Chapel

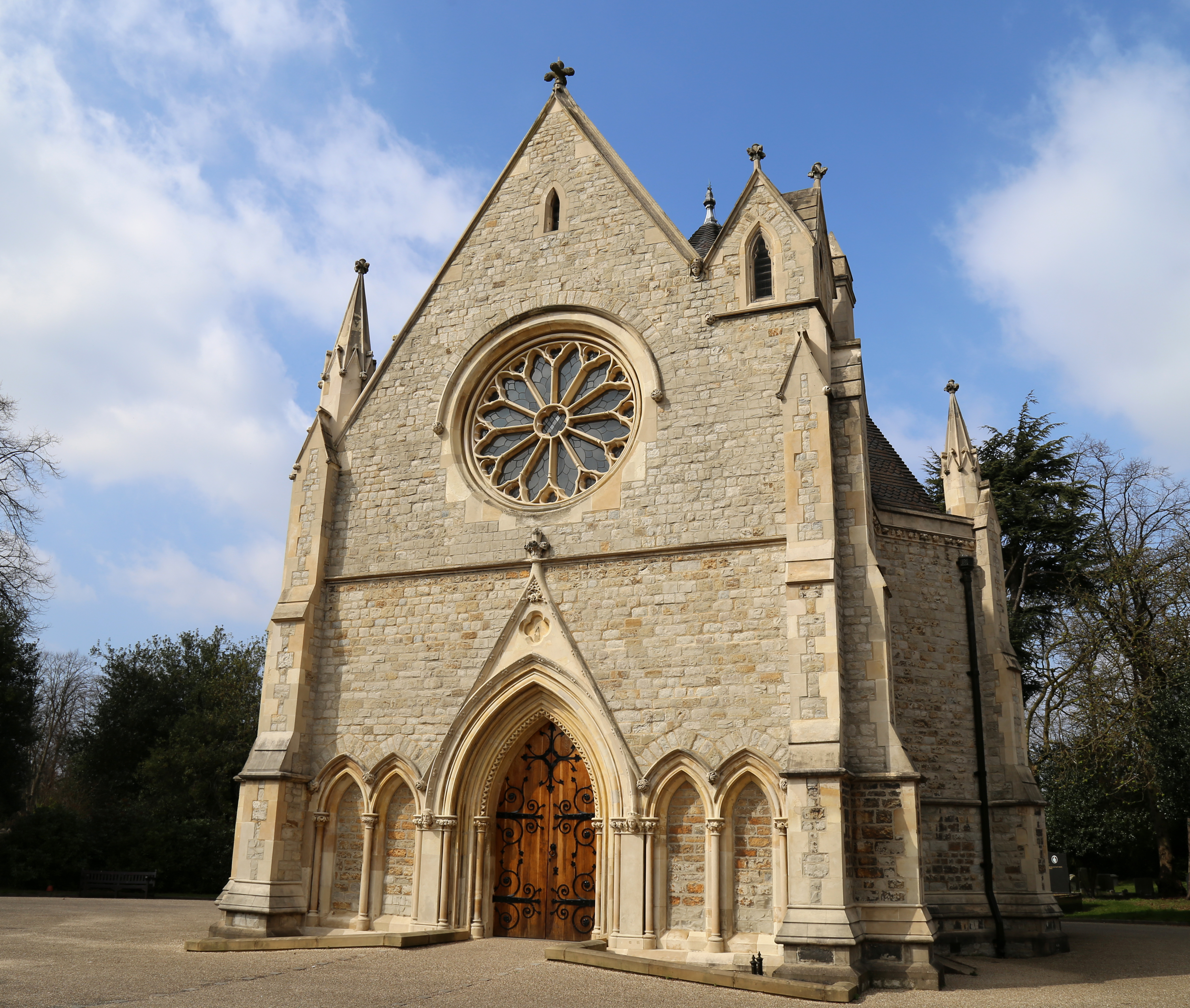
Dissenters Chapel

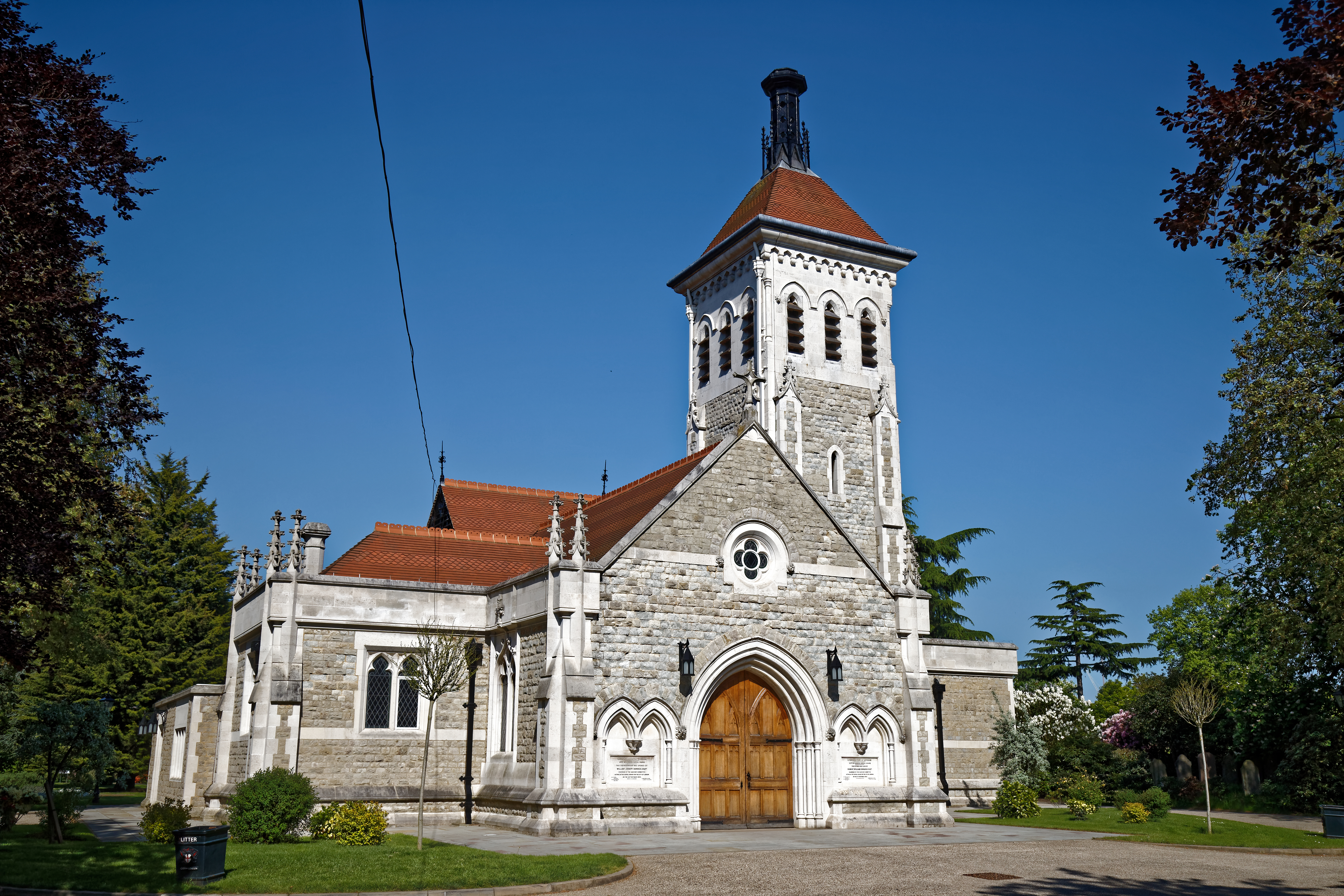
Traditional crematorium East Chapel

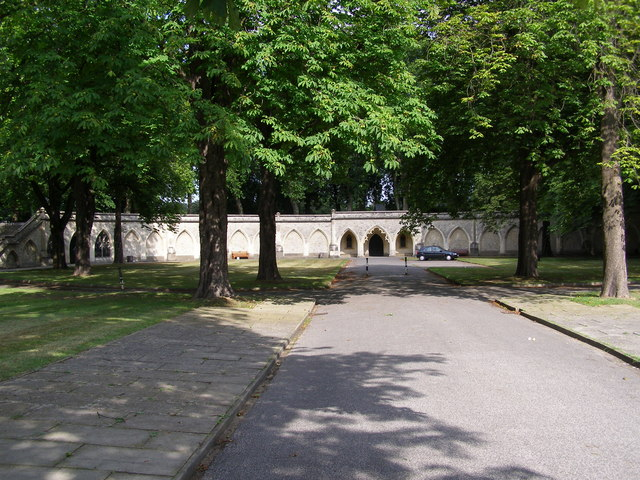
Columbarium and catacombs

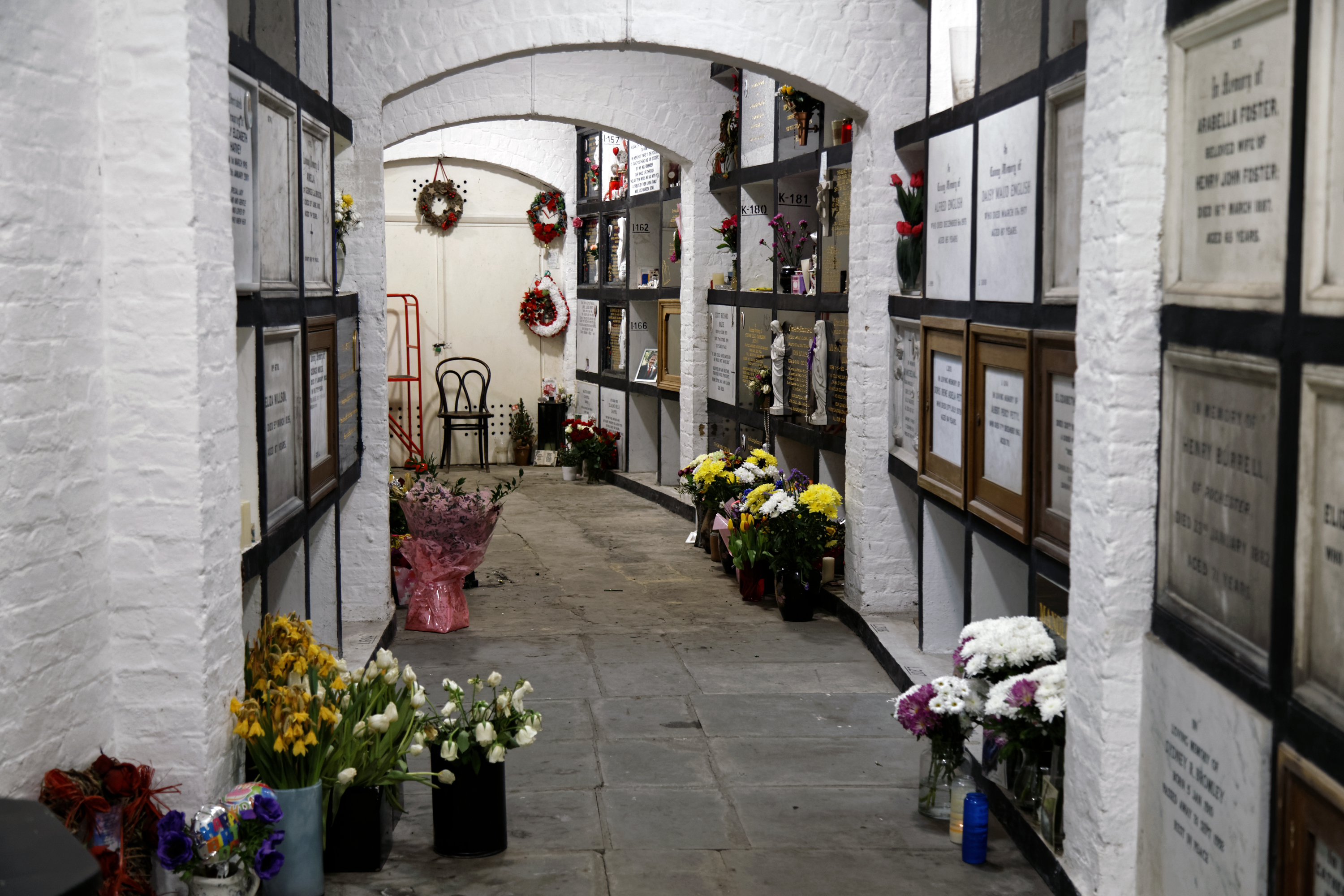
Catacomb interior

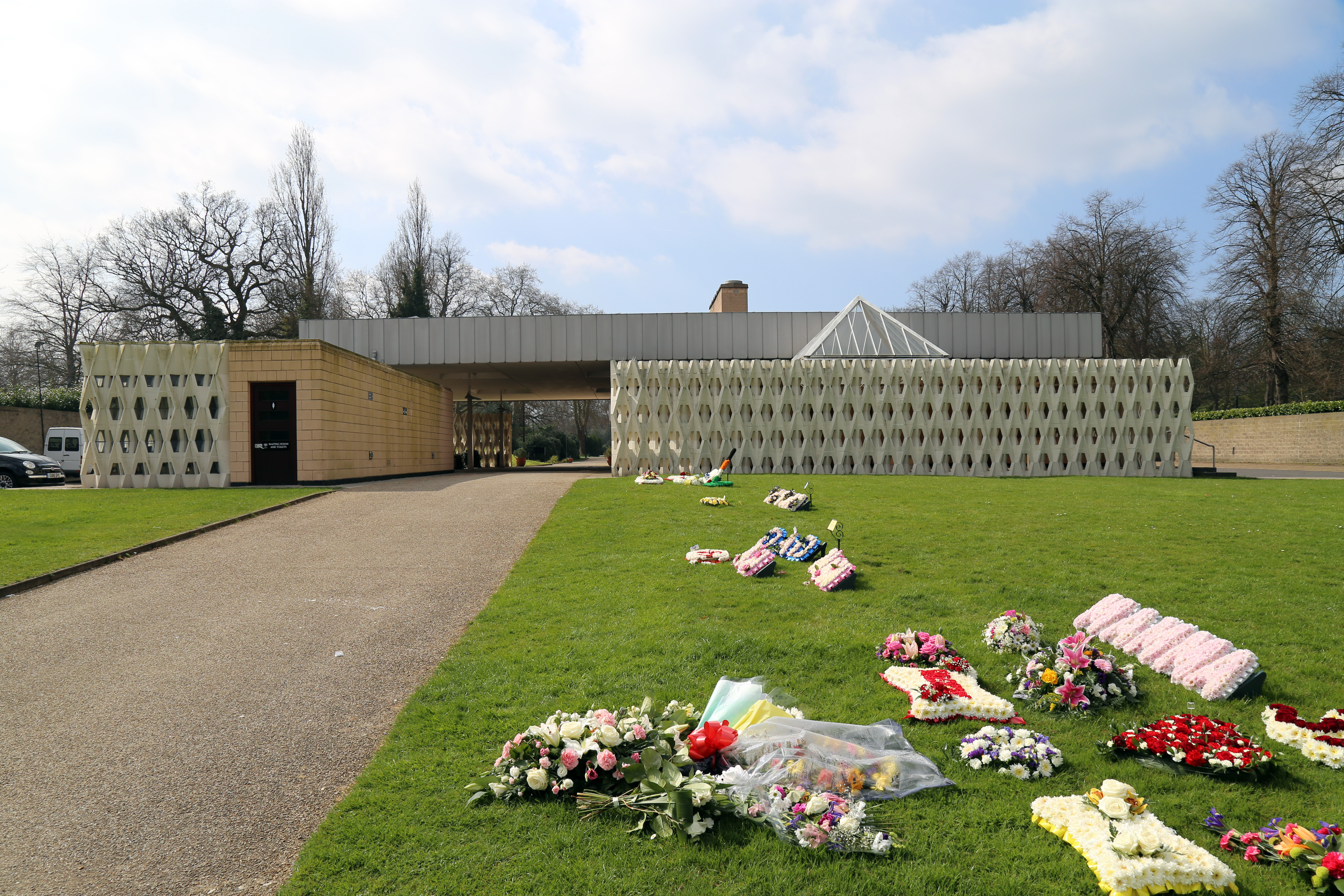
New Crematorium

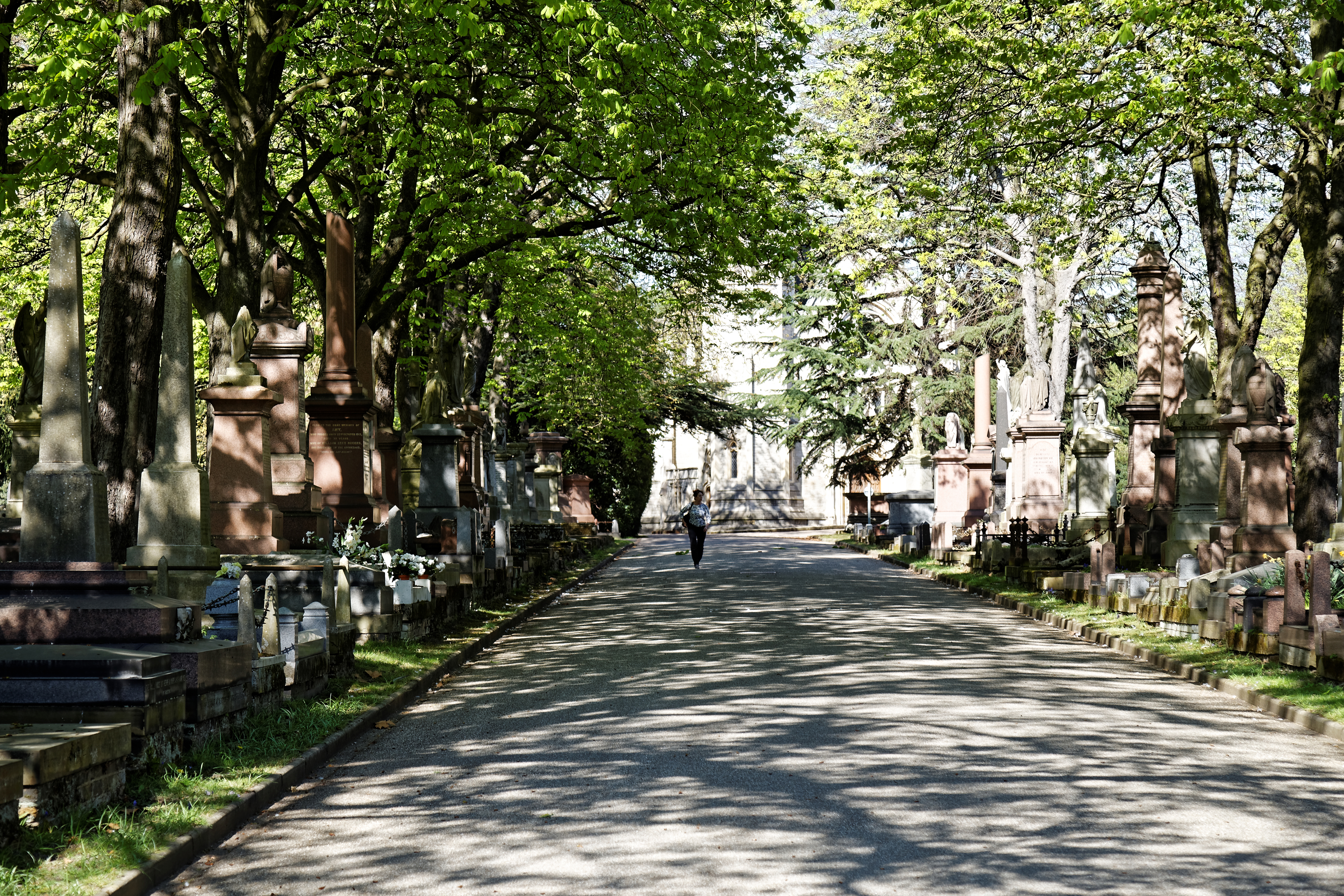
Central Avenue

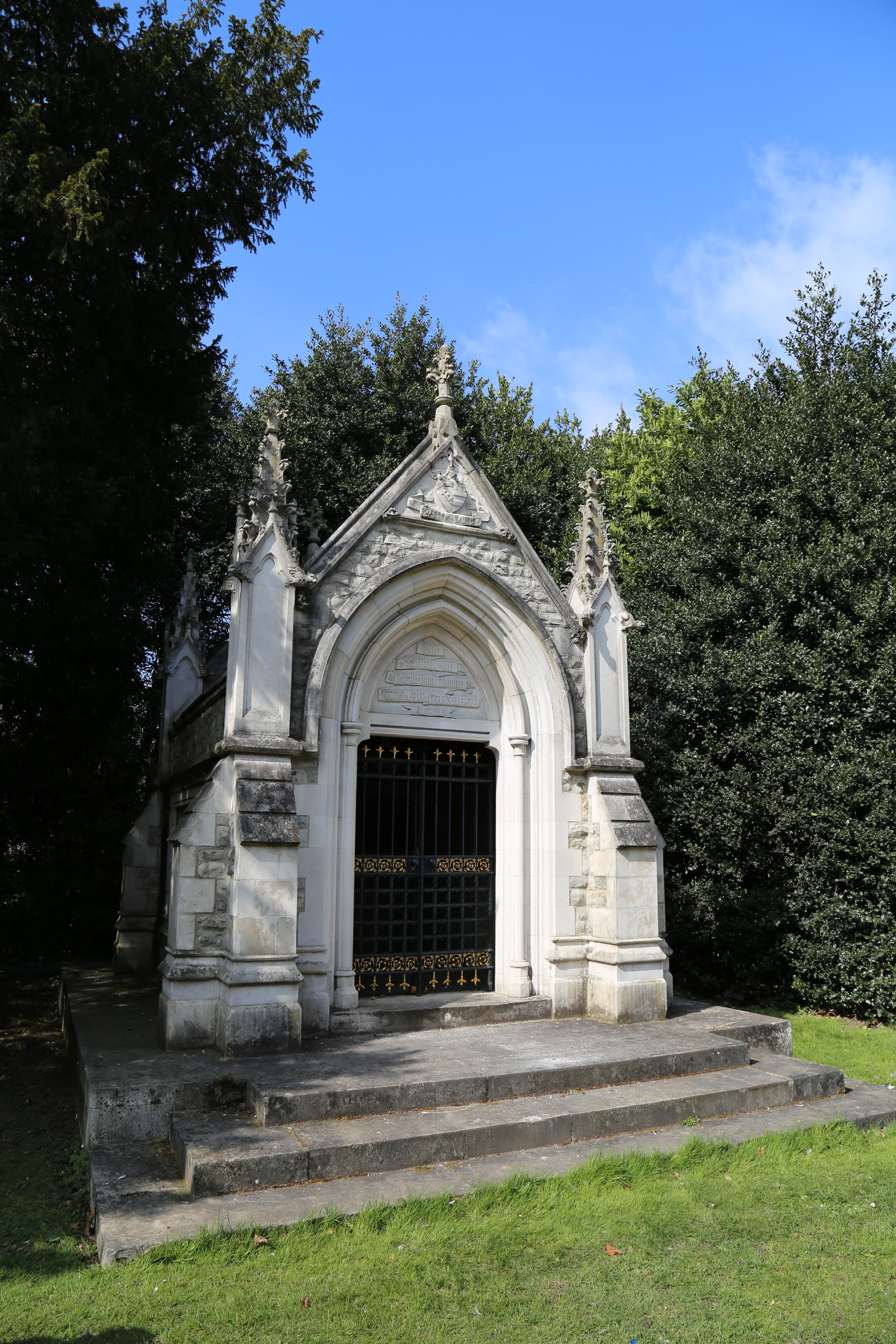
William J. Haywood mausoleum

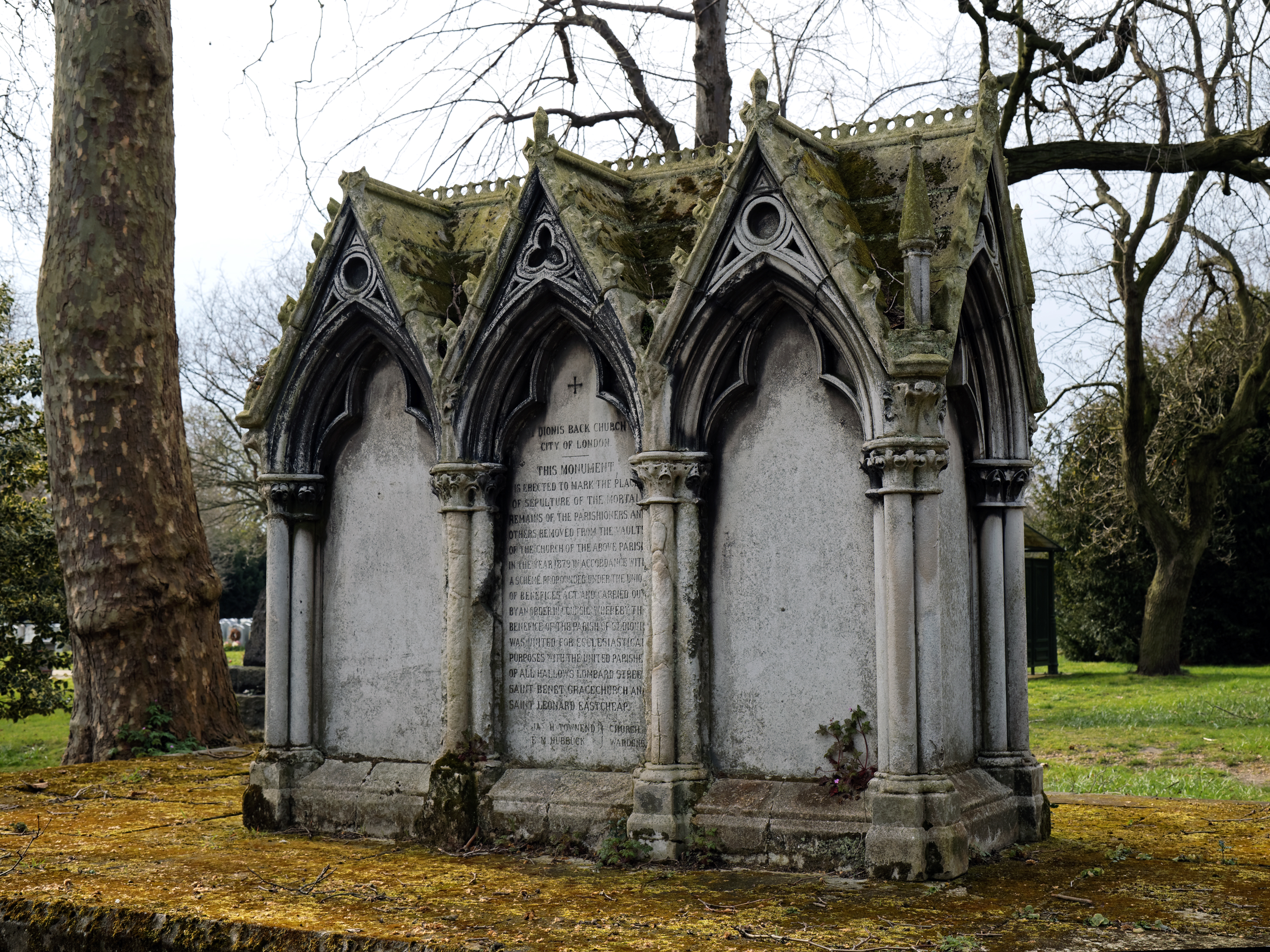
St Dionis Backchurch reburials monument

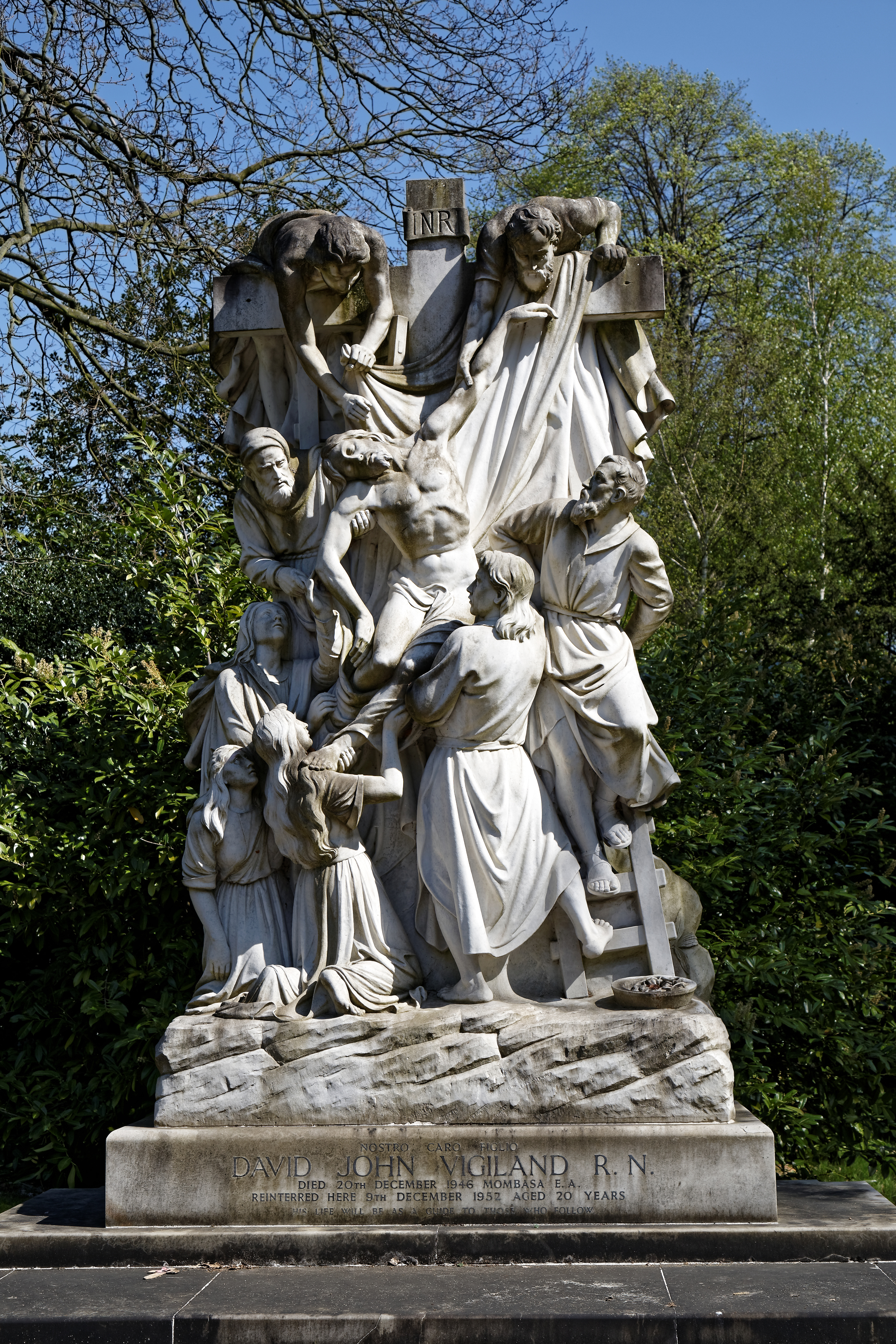
Vigiland monument

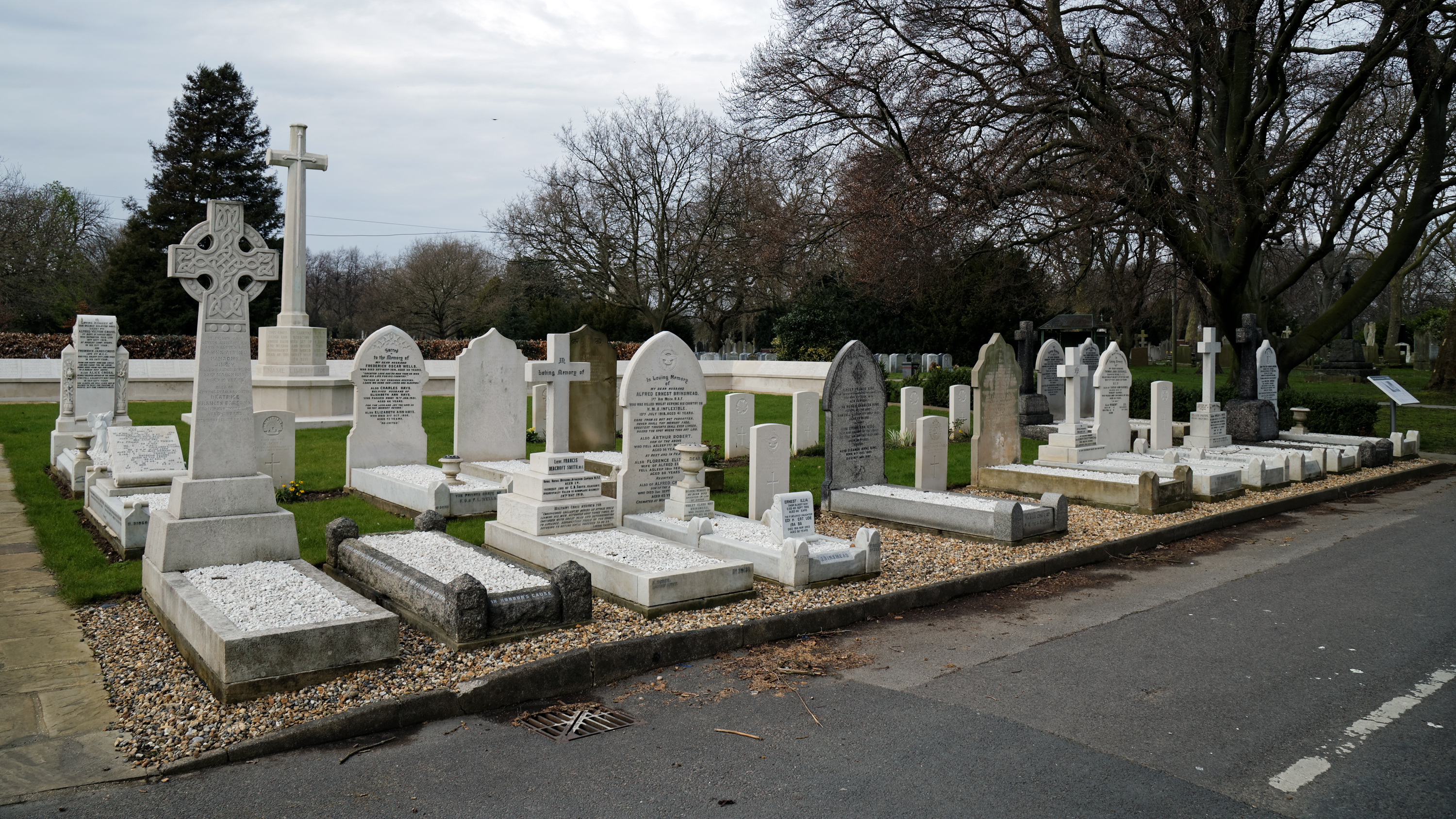
First World War Cross of Sacrifice memorial and war graves

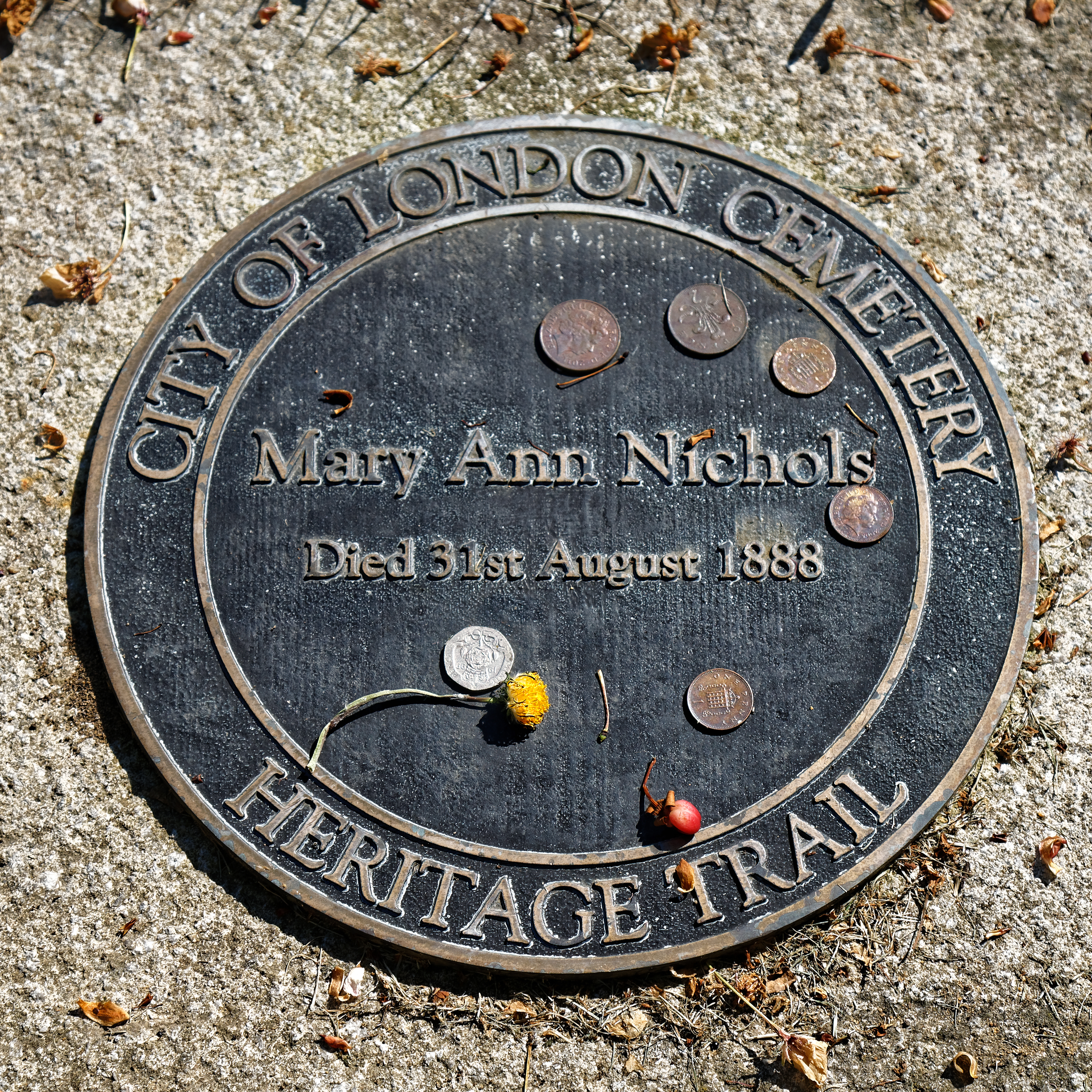
Mary Ann Nichols' grave marker

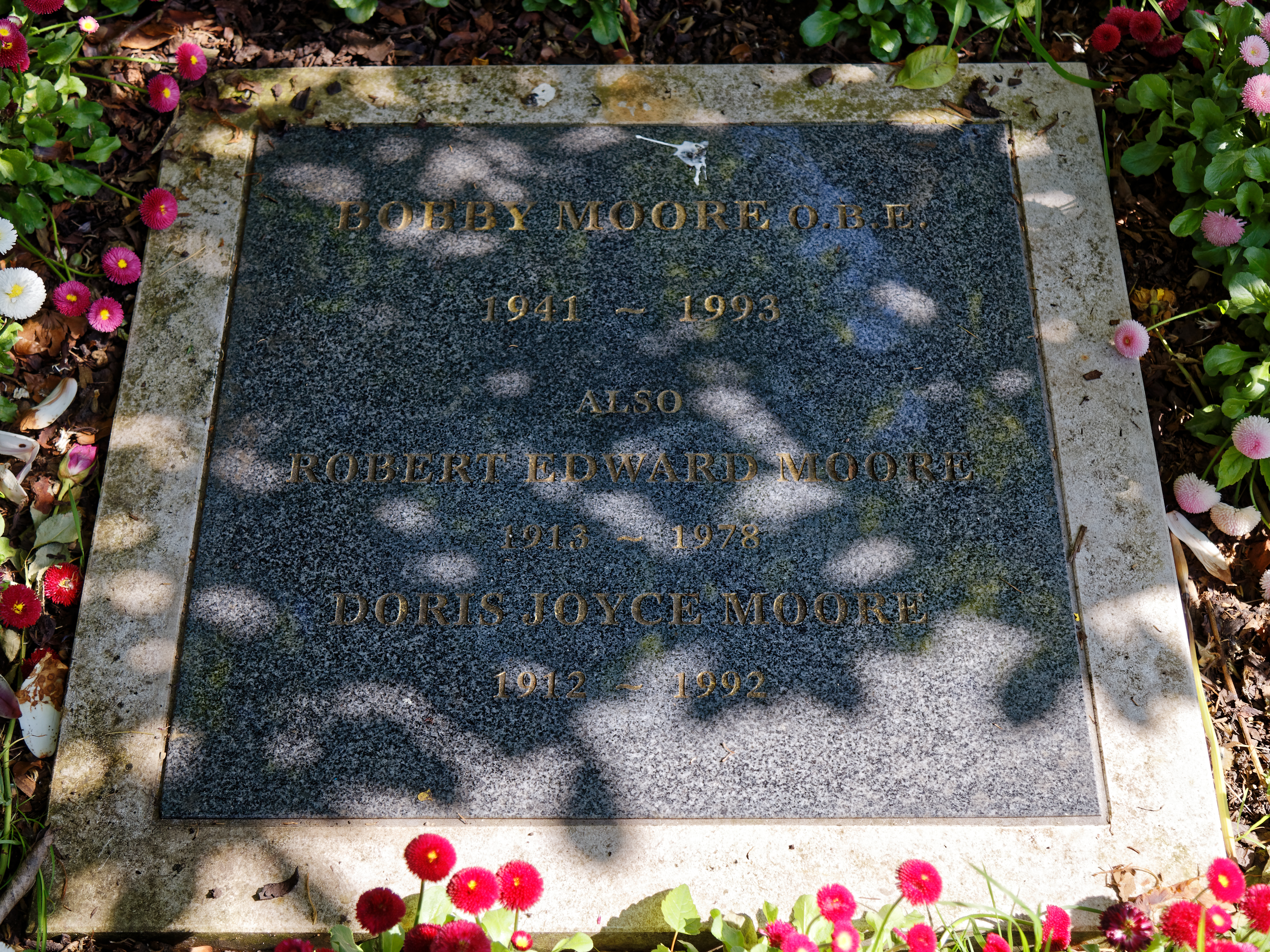
Bobby Moore grave plaque

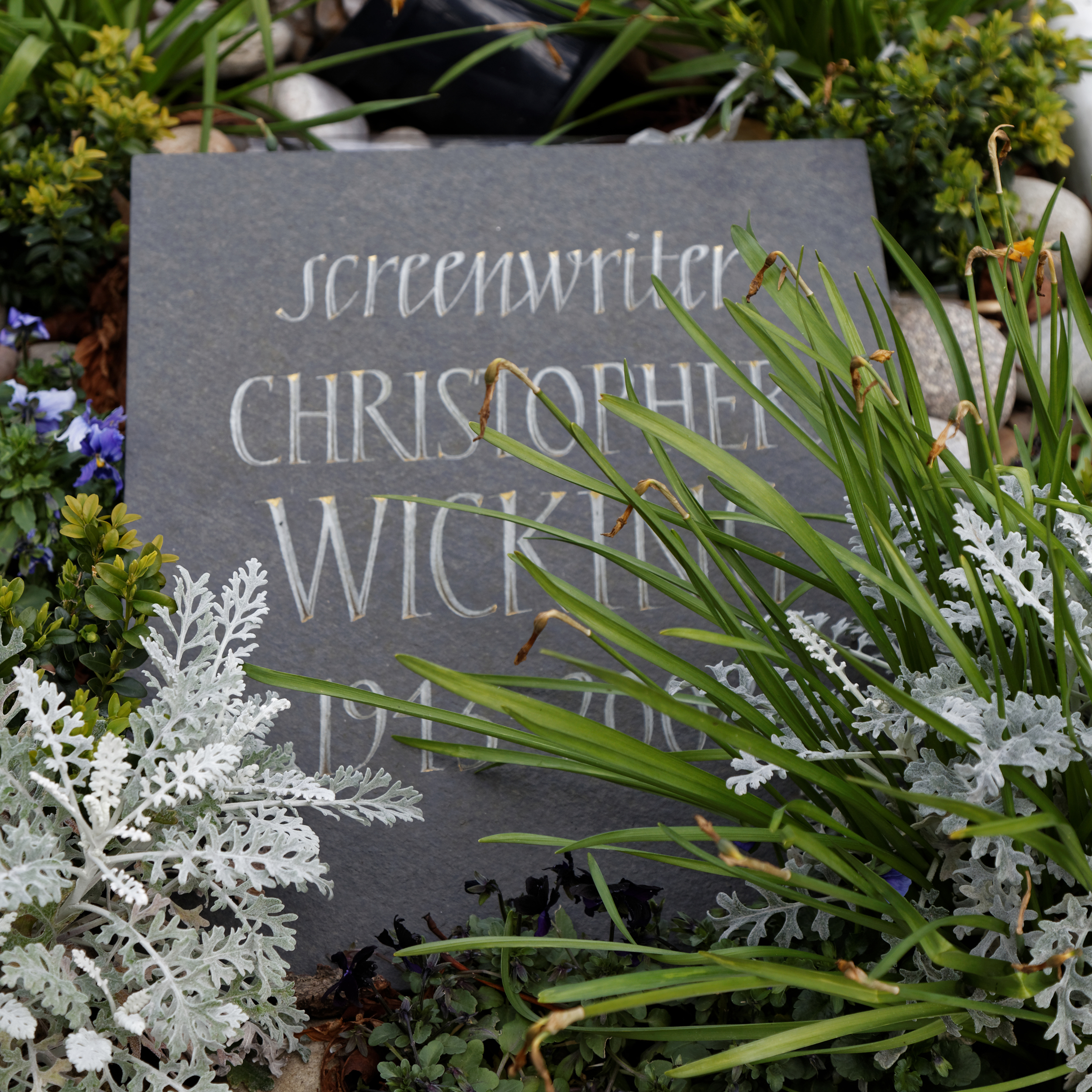
Christopher Wicking grave

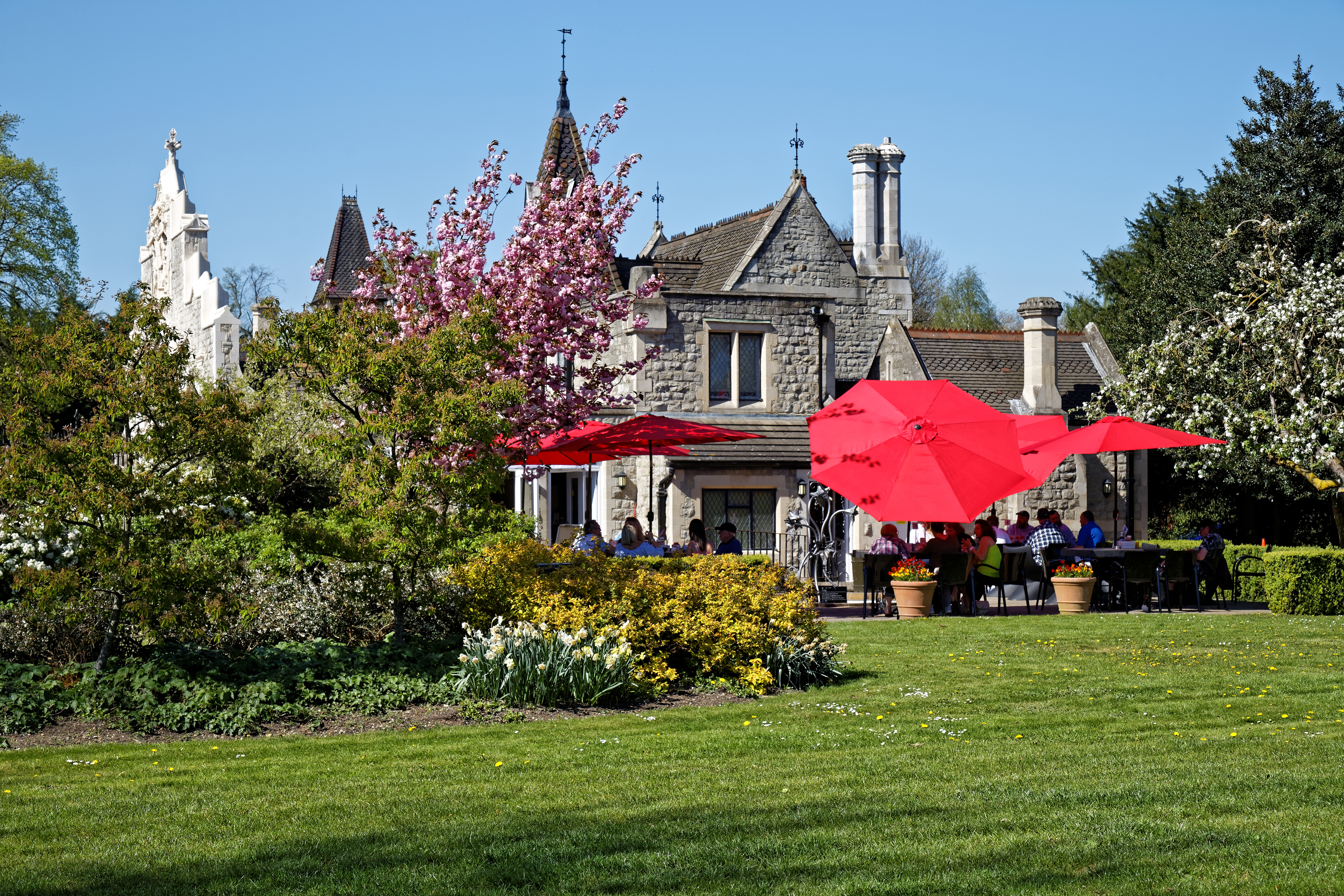
Café

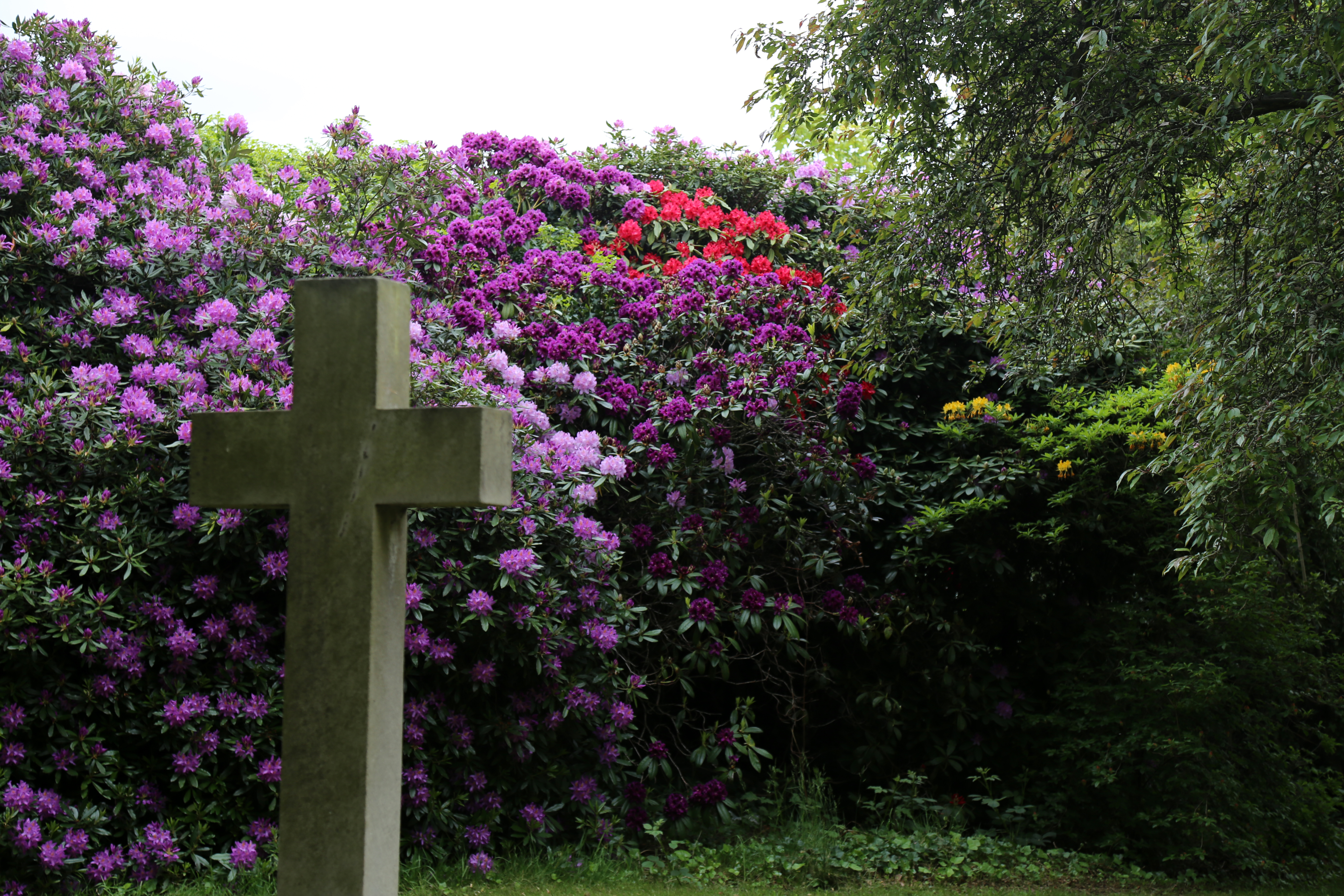
Cemetery rhododendron
