= St Mary Colechurch =

Former church-site in London

Coordinates: 51°30′49″N 0°5′28″W

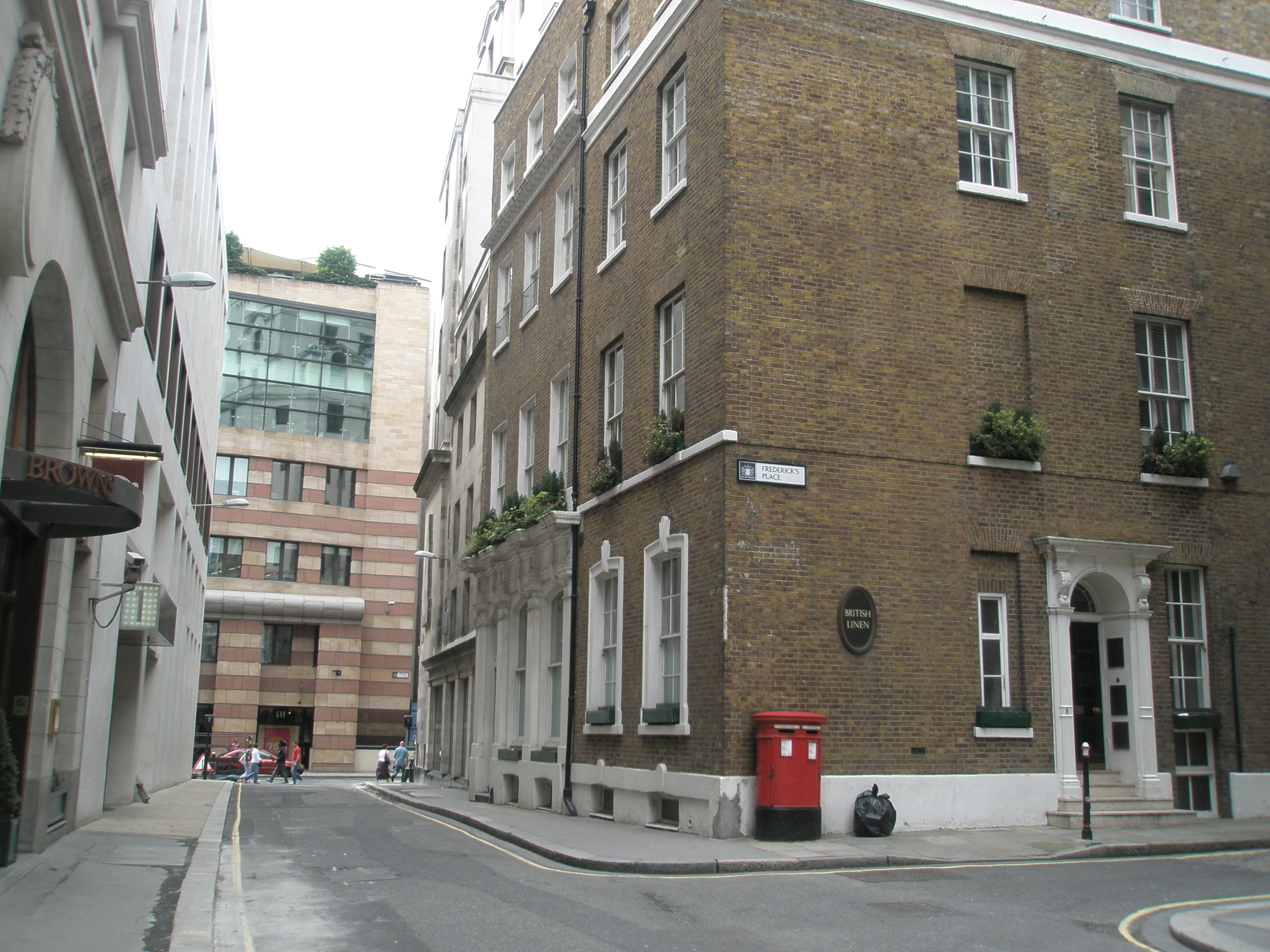
- Current picture of site
- St Mary Colechurch
- Location: London
- Country: England
- Denomination: Church of England

Architecture
- Years built: 10th century
- Demolished: 1666

Administration
- Diocese: London

St Mary Colechurch was a parish church in the City of London. It was destroyed in the Great Fire of London in 1666 and not rebuilt.

== History ==
The church was situated at the junction of Poultry and the south end of Old Jewry. Named after its first benefactor, it was a prosperous parish able to support a grammar school, which was rebuilt on the site after the Great Fire, and continued in that locality until 1787.

The Great Fire destroyed 86 of the 97 parish churches in the City of London. By 1670 a Rebuilding Act had been passed and a committee set up under Sir Christopher Wren to plan the new parishes. Fifty-one were chosen, but St Mary Colechurch was one of the minority not to be rebuilt. The parish was united with St Mildred, Poultry, although the parishioners objected on the grounds that

This was a noisy, crowded parish perpetually disturbed by carts and coaches, and wants sufficient place for burials.

When St Mildred's too was deemed surplus to requirements, following the passing of the 1860 Union of Benefices Act, it passed successively through partnerships with St Olave Jewry and St Margaret Lothbury. C. W. Pearce notes that the last traces of any building vanished in 1839, although a Parish Boundary Mark inside the Mercers' Hall still exists.

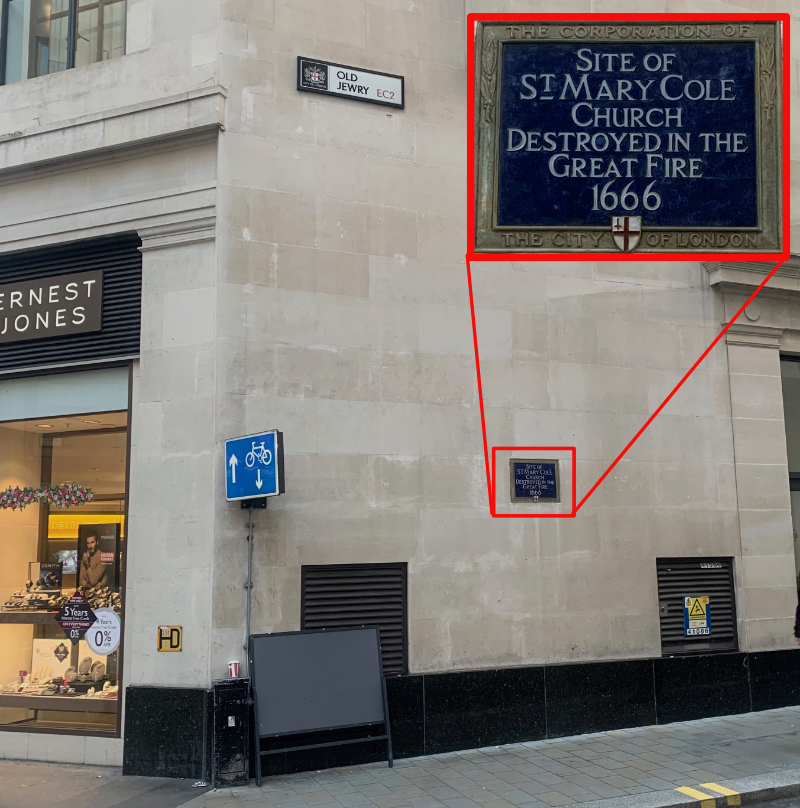
St Mary Colechurch Blue Plaque in Old Jewry

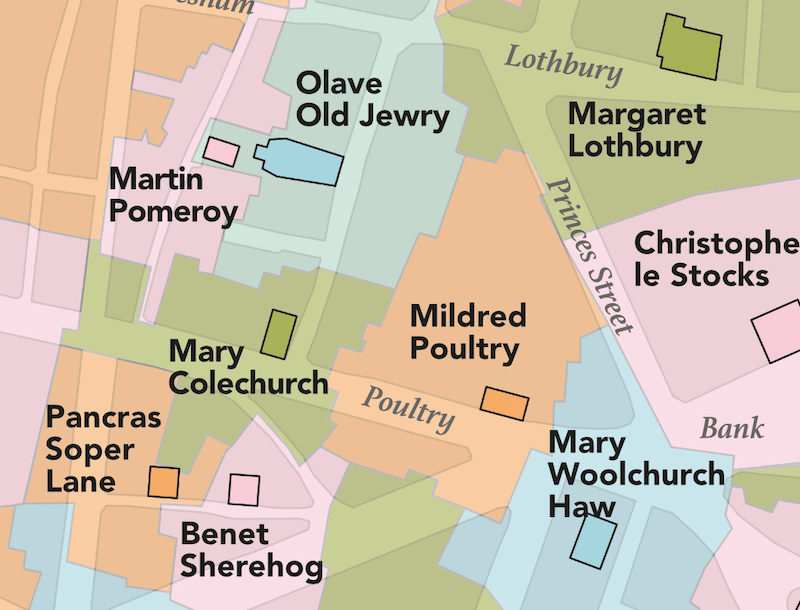
Parish map of St Mary Colechurch and St Mildred Poultry

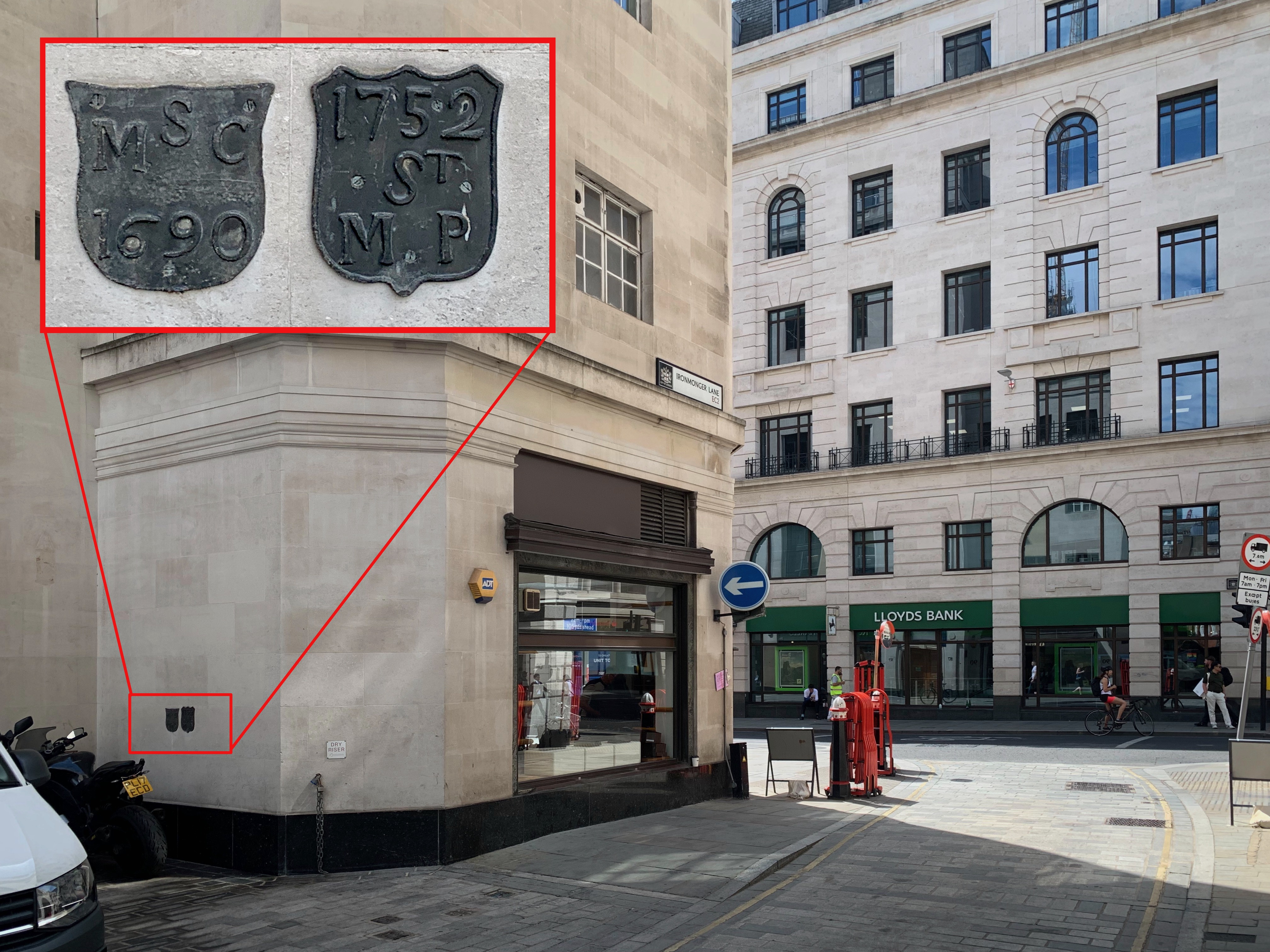
Parish Boundary Markers for St Mary Colechurch and St Martin Pomeroy

A plaque on the southwest corner of Old Jewry commemorates the church.
