= Union of Benefices Act 1860 =

Act of the Parliament of the United Kingdom

Union of Benefices Act 1860 (Note: The citation of this act by this short title was authorised by section 1 of, and the first schedule to, the Short Titles Act 1896. Due to the repeal of those provisions it is now authorised by section 19(2) of the Interpretation Act 1978.)
- Act of Parliament
- Parliament of the United Kingdom
- Long title: An Act to make better Provision for the Union of contiguous Benefices in Cities, Towns, and Boroughs.
- Citation: 23 & 24 Vict. c. 142
- Territorial extent: United Kingdom

Dates
- Royal assent: 28 August 1860
- Commencement: 28 August 1860 (Note: Section 1.)
- Repealed: 27 June 1974
Other legislation
Amended by	Statute Law Revision Act 1875
Repealed by	Statute Law (Repeals) Act 1974

Status: Repealed

Text of statute as originally enacted

The Union of Benefices Act 1860 (23 & 24 Vict. c. 142) was an act of the Parliament of the United Kingdom which prevented the need for other acts if following its prescribed three-stage scheme. It enabled reduction of the number of parish churches and vicars/rectors in London's "Metropolis", as defined by a narrower act of Parliament, the Metropolis Management Act 1855 (18 & 19 Vict. c. 120), five years before. It instead allowed commissions to recommend dissolution to various parties, which would then be a formality agreed by Order-in-Council.

It was chiefly used for the City of London, as its residential population declined in favour of commercial land use in the second half of the 19th century.

== Mechanism ==
1. Sections 3 to 6 of the act imposed and regulated prior, unpaid, commissions of inquiry.
  Three of the Commissioners shall be beneficed Clergymen residing within the Diocese, of whom One shall be nominated by the Dean and Chapter of the Cathedral Church of Saint Paul, and Two by the Bishop of the Diocese, and the remaining Two shall be Lay Members of the Church of England and shall be nominated to the Bishop by the Corporation of the City of London.
2. Section 7.
  If the Return to the Commission shall recommend an Union, the Bishop shall cause Proposals for a Scheme, based upon the Terms recommended, to be prepared for effecting the Union, which Proposals, with the Consent thereto in Writing of the Patron or Patrons of each of the Benefices affected, shall be transmitted by the Bishop to the Churchwardens of each Parish proposed to be united, in order that the same may be considered by the Inhabitants in Vestry assembled; and all such Proposals shall have especial Regard to the Residence of the Incumbent on the Benefice proposed to be constituted the united Benefice, and shall contain all necessary Provisions conducing to such Residence.
3. Section 8.
  Vestry to notify Assent, Suggestions for modification or Objections. Bishop to transmit final Proposals to Ecclesiastical Commissioners, to prepare Scheme, and certify same to the Queen in Council.

"Queen in Council" means the Privy Council of the United Kingdom.

== Eventual effects ==
Churches affected
Church	Fate	Year	United with
All Hallows Bread Street	Demolished	1876	St Mary-le-Bow
All-Hallows-the-Great	Tower demolished first; then main body	1876/1894	St Michael Paternoster Royal
All Hallows Lombard Street	Demolished	1937	St Edmund the King and Martyr
All Hallows Staining	Demolished	1870	St Olave Hart Street
Holy Trinity Gough Square	Demolished	1906	St Bride, Fleet Street
Holy Trinity, Minories	Closed(destroyed 1940)	1899	St Botolph's Aldgate
St Alphage London Wall	Demolished	1924	St Mary Aldermanbury
St Antholin, Budge Row	Demolished	1875	St Mary Aldermary
St Benet Gracechurch	Demolished	1868	All Hallows Lombard Street
St Dionis Backchurch	Demolished	1878	All Hallows Lombard Street
St George Botolph Lane	Demolished	1901-04	St Mary-at-Hill
St James Duke's Place	Demolished	1874	St Katherine Cree
St Katherine Coleman	Demolished	1926	St Olave Hart Street
St Martin Outwich	Demolished	1874	St Helen's Bishopsgate
St Mary Somerset	Demolished	1872	St Nicholas Cole Abbey
St. Mary Magdalen Old Fish Street	Caught fire, subsequently pulled down	1887	St Martin Ludgate
St Matthew Friday Street	Demolished	1885	St Vedast alias Foster
St Michael Bassishaw	Demolished	1900	St Lawrence Jewry
St Michael Queenhithe	Demolished	1875	St James Garlickhythe
St Michael Wood Street	Demolished	1895	St Alban, Wood Street
St Mildred, Poultry	Demolished	1872	St Olave Jewry
St Olave Jewry	Demolished	1888-91	St Margaret Lothbury
St Peter Le Poer	Demolished	1907	St Michael, Cornhill

As churchyards were emptied for buildings such as the new railway stations and roads, many remains were exhumed and re-interred in the City of London Cemetery.

Union of Benefices Act 1898 (Note: Section 2.)
- Act of Parliament
- Parliament of the United Kingdom
- Long title: An Act to amend the Union of Benefices Act, 1860.
- Citation: 61 & 62 Vict. c. 23
- Territorial extent: United Kingdom

Dates
- Royal assent: 25 July 1898
- Commencement: 25 July 1898 (Note: The Acts of Parliament (Commencement) Act 1793.)
- Repealed: 27 June 1974
Other legislation
Amends	Union of Benefices Act 1860
Repealed by	Statute Law (Repeals) Act 1974

Status: Repealed

Text of statute as originally enacted

This act was extended by the Union of Benefices Act 1898 (61 & 62 Vict. c. 23) This simply stated any such scheme "may be made if it provides for the erection of another church or parsonage for a benefice in the vicinity of the metropolis" [including] "any benefice within or partly within the Metropolitan Police District".

The whole act was repealed by section 1 of, and part VII of the schedule to, the Statute Law (Repeals) Act 1974, which came into force on 27 June 1974.
