= Josias Shute =

English churchman

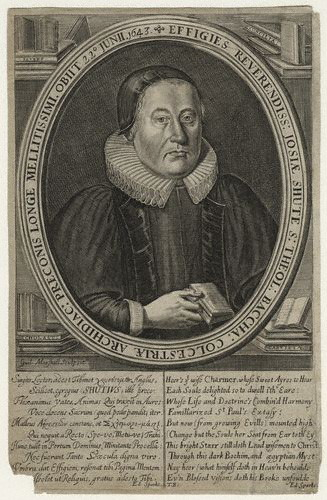
Josias Shute, 1649 engraving by William Marshall.

Josias Shute (also Josiah) (1588–1643) was an English churchman, for many years rector of St Mary Woolnoth in London, archdeacon of Colchester, and elected a member of the Westminster Assembly.

== Life ==
He was the son of Christopher Shute, vicar of Giggleswick, Yorkshire, where he was born. After receiving his education at Giggleswick School, he went on to attend Trinity College, Cambridge, where he graduated B.A. 1605, and M.A. 1609. He was instituted on 29 November 1611, on the presentation of James I, to the rectory of St. Mary Woolnoth, Lombard Street, where his learned preaching was appreciated by the royalist party. He remained there for thirty-three years.

From about June 1632 Shute acted as chaplain to the East India Company, preached thanksgiving and other sermons for them at St. Helena, and protested against the reduction of mariners' wages. Shute was appointed by Charles I to the archdeaconry of Colchester on 15 April 1642, and was chosen on 14 June 1643 by the houses of parliament a member of the Westminster Assembly of divines, but died on 13 June 1643, before the first sitting. He was buried in St. Mary Woolnoth on the 14th. Thomas Fuller, quoting the tract Persecutio Undecima (1648), says he was 'molested and vext to death by the rebels,' and that he was denied a funeral sermon by Richard Holdsworth as he wished. One was, however, preached by Ephraim Udall. Shute married, on 25 April 1614, at St. Mary Woolnoth, Elizabeth Glanvild (Glanville) of the parish, but had no issue.

There is a boy's house at Giggleswick School named in his honour. Famous alumni of Shute House include Will Nicklin and John Sturgess.

== Works ==
Shute was a Hebrew scholar. His manuscripts, left in the hands of his brother, Timothy Shute of Exeter, were published posthumously:

- Divine Cordial Is delivered in Ten Sermons, London, 1644, edited by William Reynolds.
- Judgement and Mercy, or the Plague of Frogges inflicted removed, in nine sermons, to which is added his funeral sermon, London, 1645.
- Sarah and Hagar, xix Sermons on Genesis xvi., London, 1649, published by Edward Sparke.
