= St Peter, Paul's Wharf =

Former church-site in London

Coordinates: 51.5124°N 0.0988°W

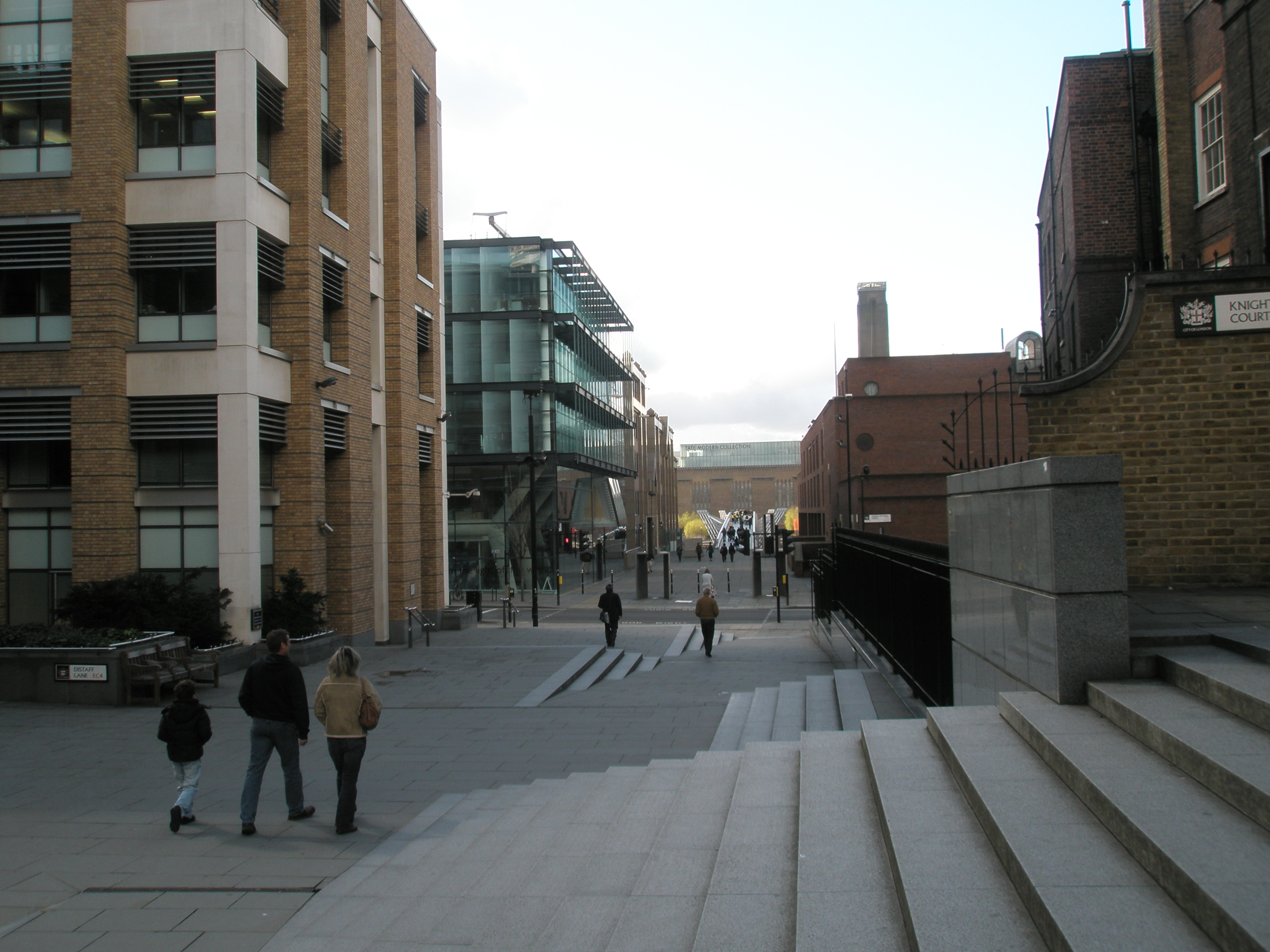
- Current photo of site
- St Peter, Paul's Wharf
- Location: London
- Country: England
- Denomination: Anglican

History
- Founded: 10th century

Architecture
- Demolished: 1666

St Peter, Paul's Wharf, was a Church of England parish church in the City of London. It was destroyed in the Great Fire in 1666.

First mentioned in the 12th century, it stood to the north of Upper Thames Street in Queenhithe Ward. The parish was defiant in continuing to use the Book of Common Prayer during the Civil War.

St Peter's was, along with most of the City's other parish churches, destroyed by the Great Fire in 1666. A Rebuilding Act was passed and a committee set up under Sir Christopher Wren to decide which would be rebuilt. Fifty-one were chosen, but St Peter Paul's Wharf was not among them. Following the fire, the parish was united with that of St Benet Paul's Wharf.
