= St Olave's Church, Old Jewry =

Former church-site in London

Coordinates: 51°30′52.15″N 0°5′28.70″W

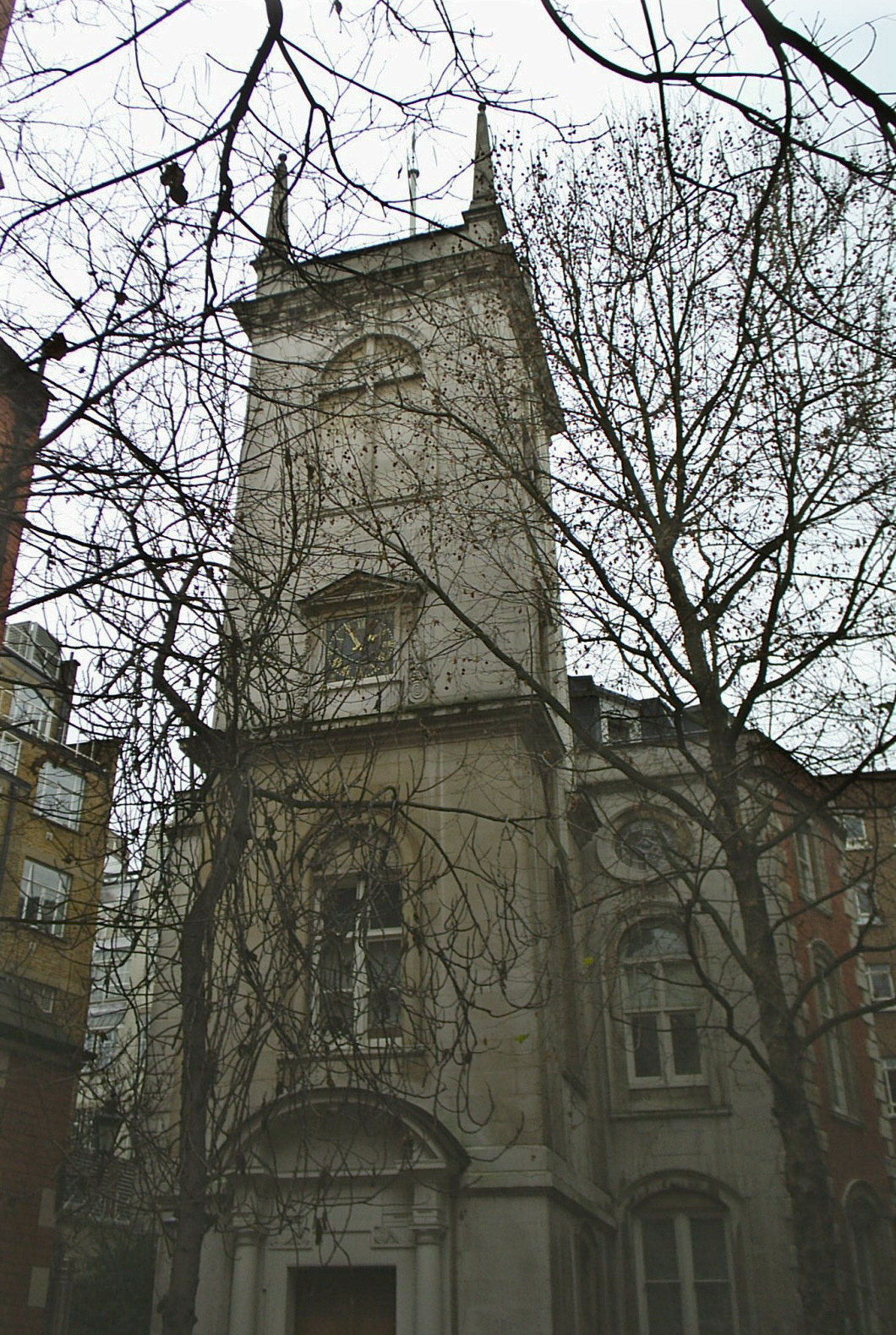
- Tower and west wall of St. Olave Old Jewry
- St Olave's Church, Old Jewry
- Country: England
- Denomination: Anglican

Architecture
- Architect: Sir Christopher Wren
- Style: Baroque

St Olave's Church, Old Jewry, sometimes known as Upwell Old Jewry, was a church in the City of London located between the street called Old Jewry and Ironmonger Lane. Destroyed in the Great Fire of London in 1666, the church was rebuilt by the office of Sir Christopher Wren. The church was demolished in 1887, except for the tower and west wall, which remain today.

== History ==
St Olave, Old Jewry is dedicated to the 11th-century patron saint of Norway, St Olaf. Old Jewry was the precinct of medieval London largely occupied and populated by Jews until their expulsion from England in 1290. The church is also recorded as St Olave in Colechirchlane and St Olave, Upwell, the latter appellation coming from a well under the east end of the church.

The earliest surviving reference is in a manuscript of c. 1130, but excavations made during 1985 uncovered the foundations of a Saxon predecessor, built between the 9th and 11th centuries, from Kentish ragstone and recycled Roman bricks.

After the church's destruction in the Great Fire, the parish was united with that of St Martin Pomeroy, a tiny church that already shared the small churchyard of St Olave Old Jewry. The two pre-Fire churches were nearly adjacent. Rebuilding began in 1671, incorporating much of the medieval walls and foundations. The tower was built separately, projecting from the west of the church, and required the carpenter to build a timber platform 16 feet (4.9 m) below ground to support the rubble foundation. The church was completed in 1679 at a cost of £5,580, including £10 paid to the then still ruined St Paul's Cathedral for rubble.

St Olave's was the burial place of Robert Large, Lord Mayor, mercer and master of William Caxton, in 1440. A much later Lord Mayor, and publisher, John Boydell was buried in the church in 1804. Boydell would visit the church pump (built atop the medieval well) at 5 am each morning, place his periwig on top and douse his head from the spout. His monument survives, transplanted to St Margaret Lothbury. The memorial inscriptions of St Olave's were recorded and published by F.A. Crisp in 1887.

The Master of the King's Music, Maurice Greene, was buried in St Olave's in 1755. Upon the church's demolition, his remains were moved to St. Paul's Cathedral.

Despite being restored in 1879, the body of the church was demolished in 1887 under the Union of Benefices Act 1860. The site was sold for £22,400 and the proceeds used to build St Olave's Manor House. The dead were disinterred and their remains moved to City of London Cemetery, Manor Park, the parish combined with that of St Margaret Lothbury, and the furnishings dispersed to several other churches. The reredos, font cover and other wooden furnishings and plate went to St Margaret Lothbury; the royal arms went to St Andrew-by-the-Wardrobe; the clock went to St Olave Hart Street; the pulpit and baptismal font went to St Olave's Manor House; and the organ went to Christchurch in Penge. The tower, west wall and part of the north wall were kept and incorporated into a new building which included a rectory for St Margaret Lothbury. This was replaced in 1986 by an office building, in a sympathetic style, designed by the firm of architects Swanke, Hayden, Connell. The churchyard survives as the courtyard to the office building.

== Architecture ==
In outline, the church was shaped like a wine bottle on its side, with the projecting west tower a truncated neck, the angular west front its shoulders, tapering towards a narrow base to the east. The main façade was on Old Jewry and featured a large Venetian window with columns and a full entablature.

The 88-foot (27 m) tower is the only one built by Wren's office that is battered, i.e., is slightly wider at the bottom than the top. The door to the tower has a segmental pediment and is flanked by Doric columns. On top of the tower is a simple parapet with tall obelisks on each corner with balls on top. In the centre of the tower is a vane in the shape of a sailing ship, taken from St Mildred, Poultry.

A tower clock dated 1824 (built by Moore & Son of Clerkenwell) was removed with the rest of the church furnishings at the time of the demolition; in 1891 it was installed in the tower of St Olave's Hart Street. The current clock was installed after 1972. The pediment which surrounds it is original and previously framed a window.

A description from the early 18th century describes the interior as extensively decorated with paintings to an extent unparalleled in other Wren churches, viz.,

1. Of Queen Elizabeth lying on a fine couch with her regalia, under an arched canopy, on which are placed her arms.
2. Of King Charles I.
3. The figure of Time, with wings displayed, a scythe in his right hand, and an hour glass in his left; at his foot is a Cupid dormant, and under him a skeleton eight feet long.

The remains of the church were designated a Grade I listed building on 4 January 1950.

== See also ==
- List of Christopher Wren churches in London
- List of churches rebuilt after the Great Fire but since demolished
