= St Martin Pomary =

Former church-site in London

Coordinates: 51°30′49″N 0°5′30″W

St Martin Pomeroy, originally called St Martin Pomary
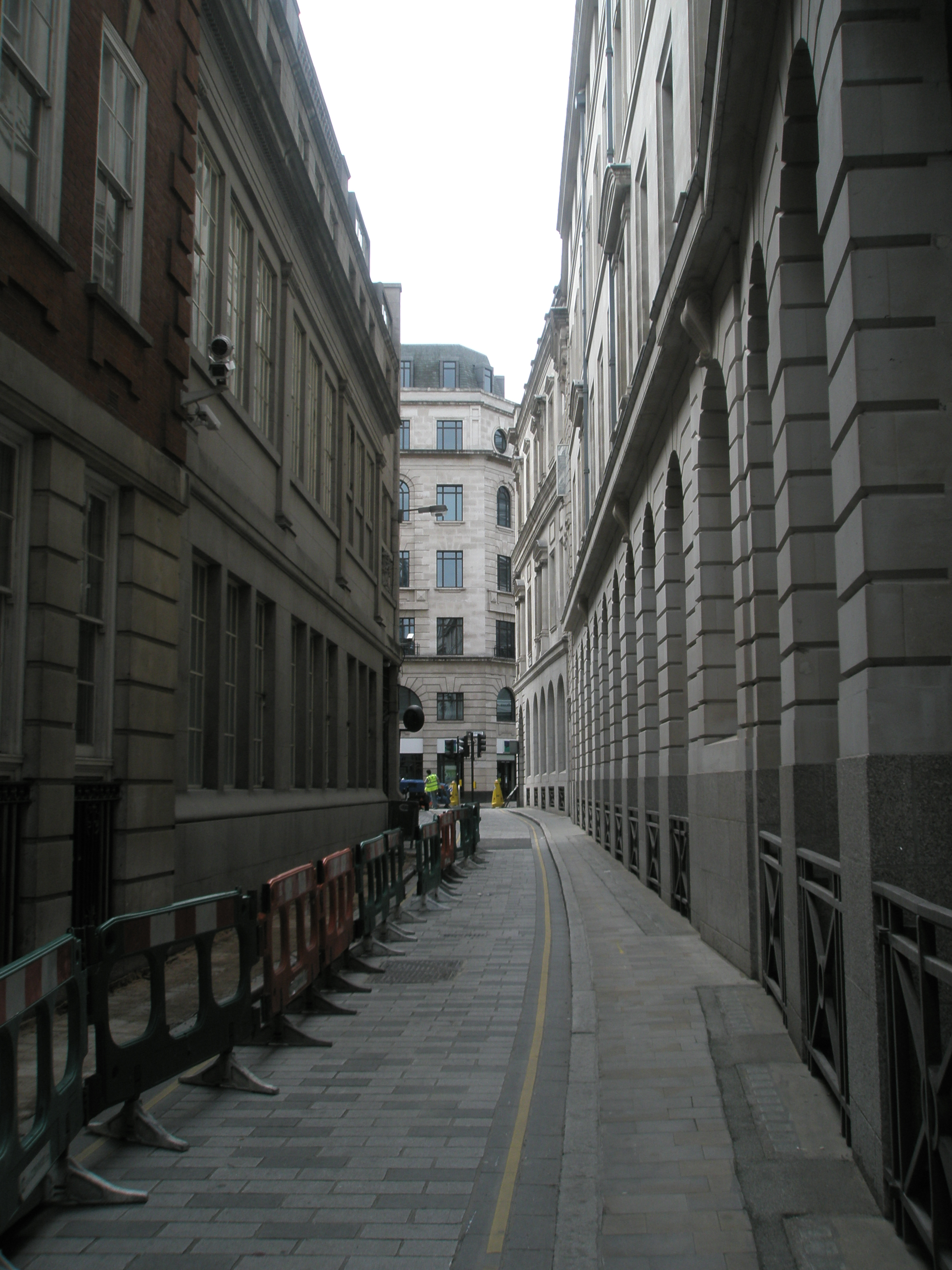
- Current photo of site
- St Martin Pomeroy, originally called St Martin Pomary
- Location: Ironmonger Lane, London
- Country: England
- Denomination: Anglican

Architecture
- Demolished: 1666 by the Great Fire

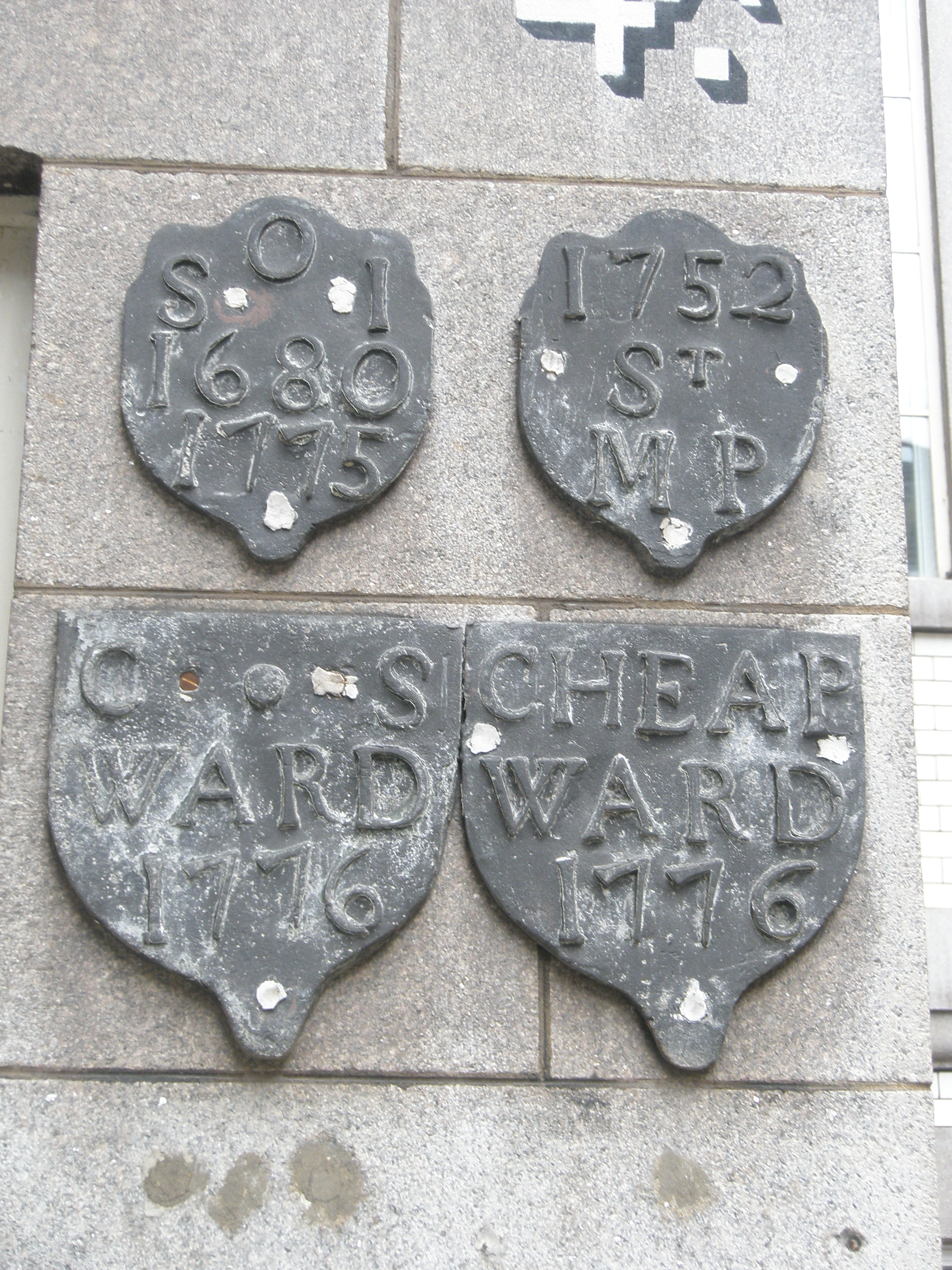
Parish boundary mark

St Martin Pomeroy was a parish church in the Cheap ward of the City of London. It was also known as St Martin Ironmonger Lane.

== Location ==
The church stood on the east side of Ironmonger Lane in the Cheap ward of the City of London. John Stow suggested that the name "Pomary" indicated that apple trees had once grown near the church. The patronage of the church belonged to the prior and canons of St Bartholomew the Great, until the dissolution of the priory, when it passed to the Crown.

In 1627 much of the north wall had to be rebuilt, and two years later the whole church was "repaired and beautified" at the cost of the parishioners. The church was destroyed in the Great Fire of London in 1666 and not rebuilt. Instead the parish was united with that of St Olave Jewry and the site of the church retained as a burial ground.

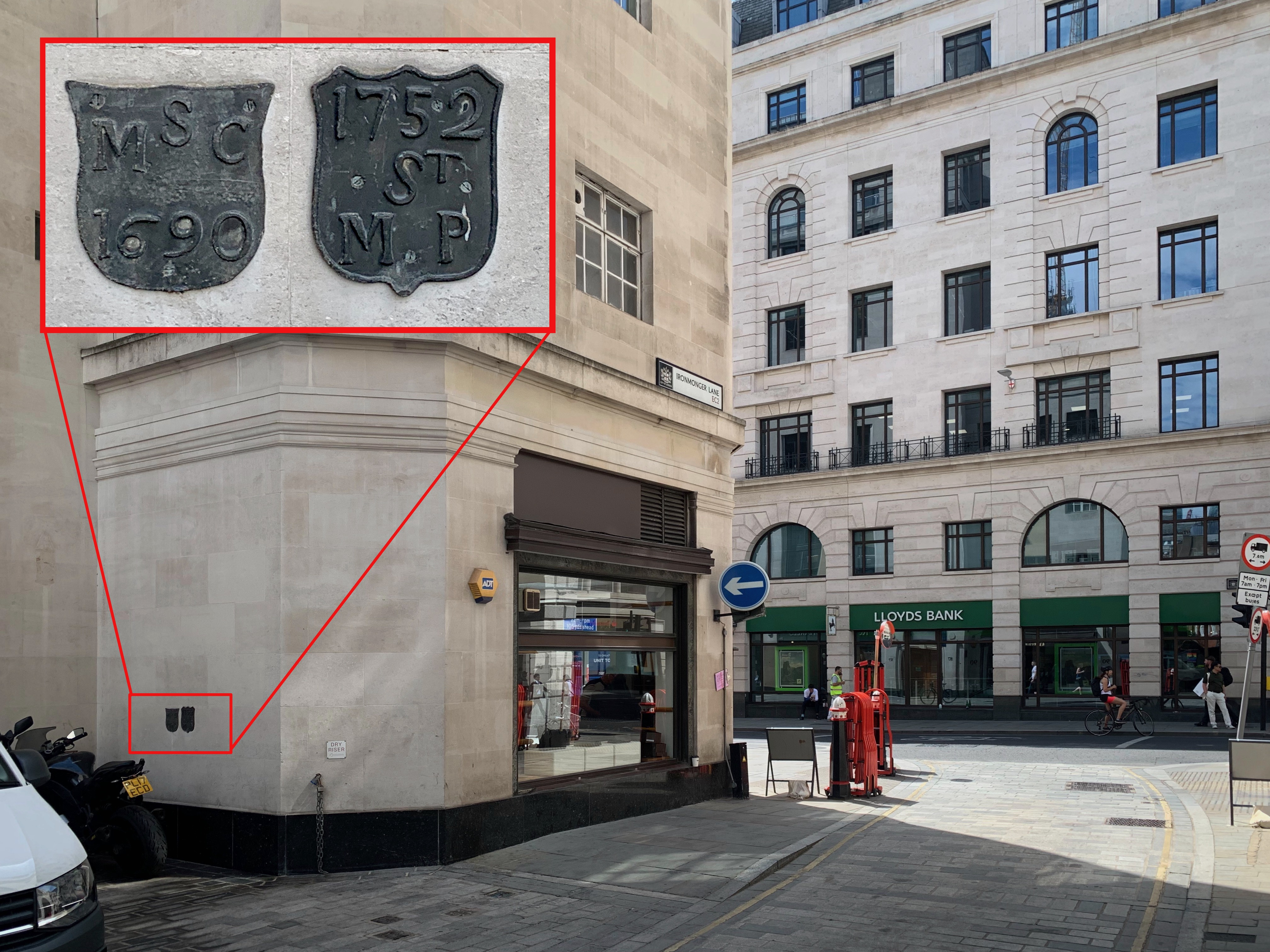
Parish Boundary Markers for St Mary Colechurch and St Martin Pomeroy
