= St Margaret Lothbury =

Coordinates: 51°30′52.91″N 0°5′19.92″W

- Ward and Parish Church of Saint Margaret, Lothbury
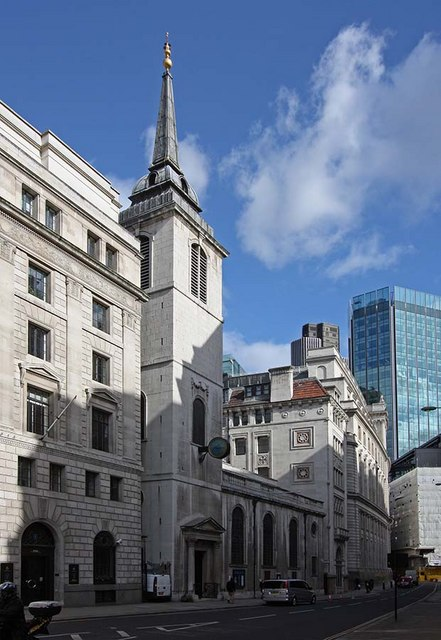
- Exterior

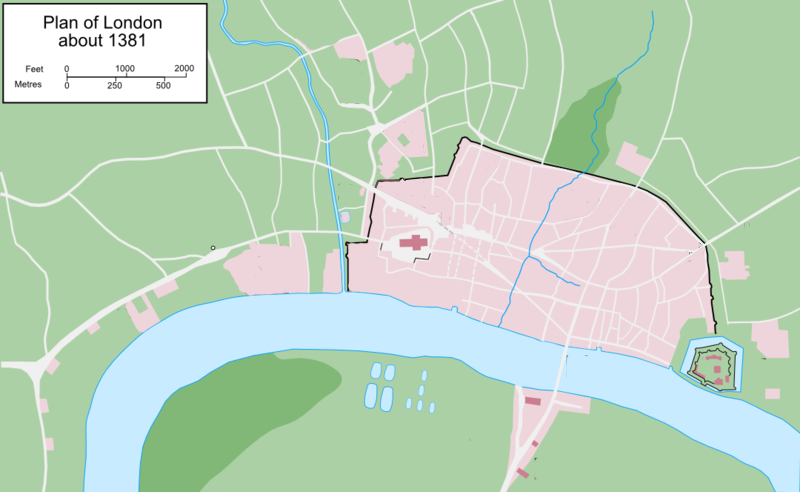
- Location: Lothbury, City of London, EC2
- Country: England
- Denomination: Church of England
- Previous denomination: Roman Catholic (to 1538)
- Religious order: Benedictines (to 1538)
- Website: stml.org.uk

History
- Founded: By 1185
- Dedication: Margaret of Antioch

Architecture
- Heritage designation: Grade I listed building
- Architect: Christopher Wren
- Style: English Baroque

Administration
- Diocese: London
- Parish: St Margaret Lothbury & St Mary Woolnoth

Clergy
- Rector: The Revd Tosin Oladipo

St Margaret Lothbury is a Church of England parish church on Lothbury in the City of London; it spans the boundary between Coleman Street Ward and Broad Street Ward. Recorded since the 12th century, the church was destroyed in the Great Fire of London in 1666 and rebuilt by the office of Sir Christopher Wren. St Margaret Lothbury still serves as a parish church, as well as being the official church of five Livery Companies, two Ward Clubs and two Professional Institutes. It also has connections with many local finance houses, all of which hold special services each year.

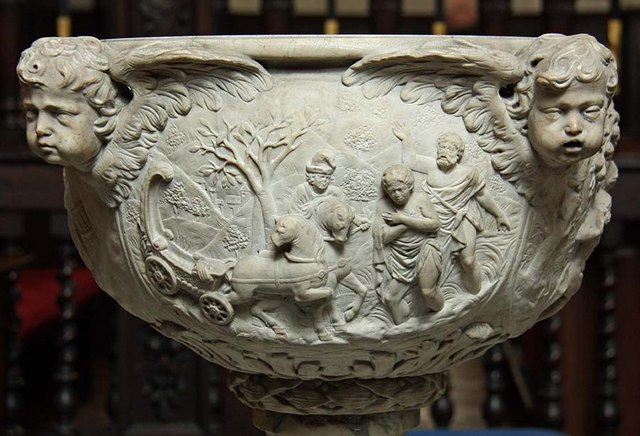
Detail of baptismal font

== History ==
The earliest mention of St Margaret Lothbury is from 1185; it is dedicated to Margaret of Antioch (Margaret the Virgin) (fl. 4th century AD). The patronage of the church belonged to the abbess and convent of Barking, Essex until the Dissolution, when it passed to the Crown.

It was rebuilt in 1440, mostly at the expense of Robert Large, who was Lord Mayor that year and is remembered as the Master of whom William Caxton served his apprenticeship. It suffered as did so many of London's churches in the Great Fire of London of 1666 and was rebuilt by Christopher Wren from 1686 to 1690.

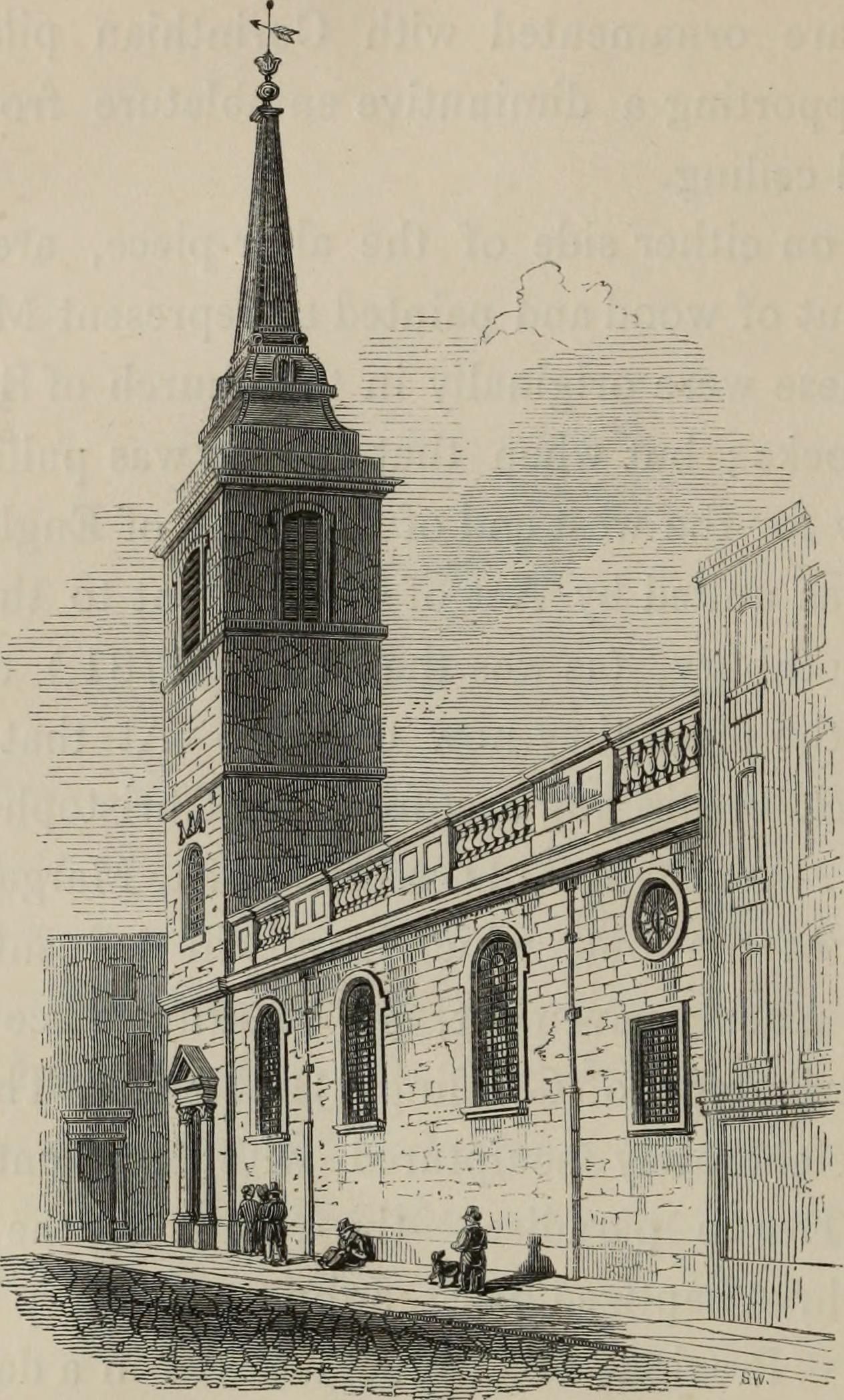
The church in 1838. Note that the hanging clock had not been installed at this time

In 1781 the parish of the church of St Christopher le Stocks, demolished to make way for an extension to the Bank of England, was united with that of St Margaret Lothbury.

== Interior ==
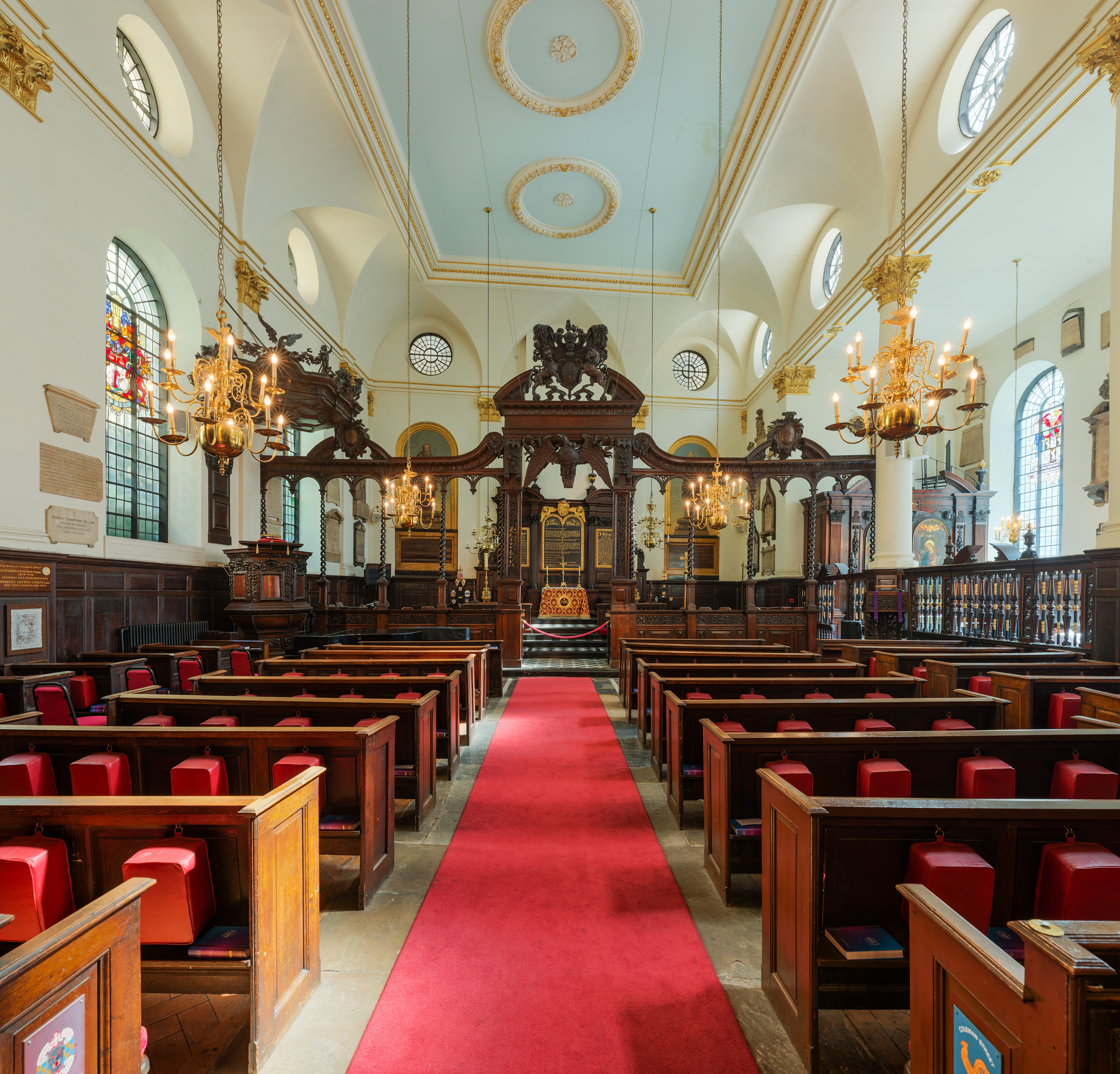
St Margaret Lothbury interior

The church has exceptionally fine 17th-century woodwork from other now-demolished Wren churches. Among the best are the reredos, communion rails and baptismal font, which are thought to be by Grinling Gibbons from St Olave, Old Jewry, the pulpit sounding board and the rood screen from All-Hallows-the-Great. Two paintings of Moses and Aaron flank the high altar, and came from St Christopher le Stocks when it was demolished in 1781. The organ was built by George Pike England in 1801. It was restored in 1984, stands in its original case and contains nearly all its original pipework.

The church was designated a Grade I listed building on 4 January 1950.

== See also ==
- List of churches and cathedrals of London
- List of Christopher Wren churches in London
