= Mary Hudson =

Mary Hudson may refer to:

- Mary Hudson (businesswoman)
- Mary Hudson (organist)
- Mary Hudson (scientist)
- Mary Hudson (writer)
