= Actors' Church =

Actors' Church is a title common in London to refer to the two churches in Covent Garden, also known as Theatreland:

- Corpus Christi Roman Catholic Church, Maiden Lane - The Roman Catholic Actors' Church
- St Paul's, Covent Garden - The Church of England Actors' Church
