= Hart Street =

Street in the City of London, United Kingdom

Coordinates: 51.5110°N 0.0798°W

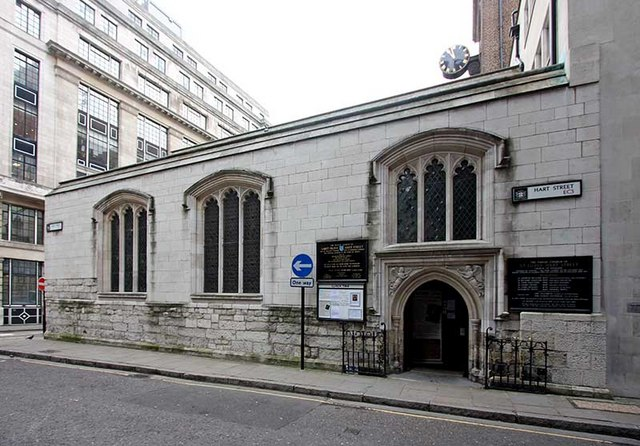
St Olave's Church on Hart Street

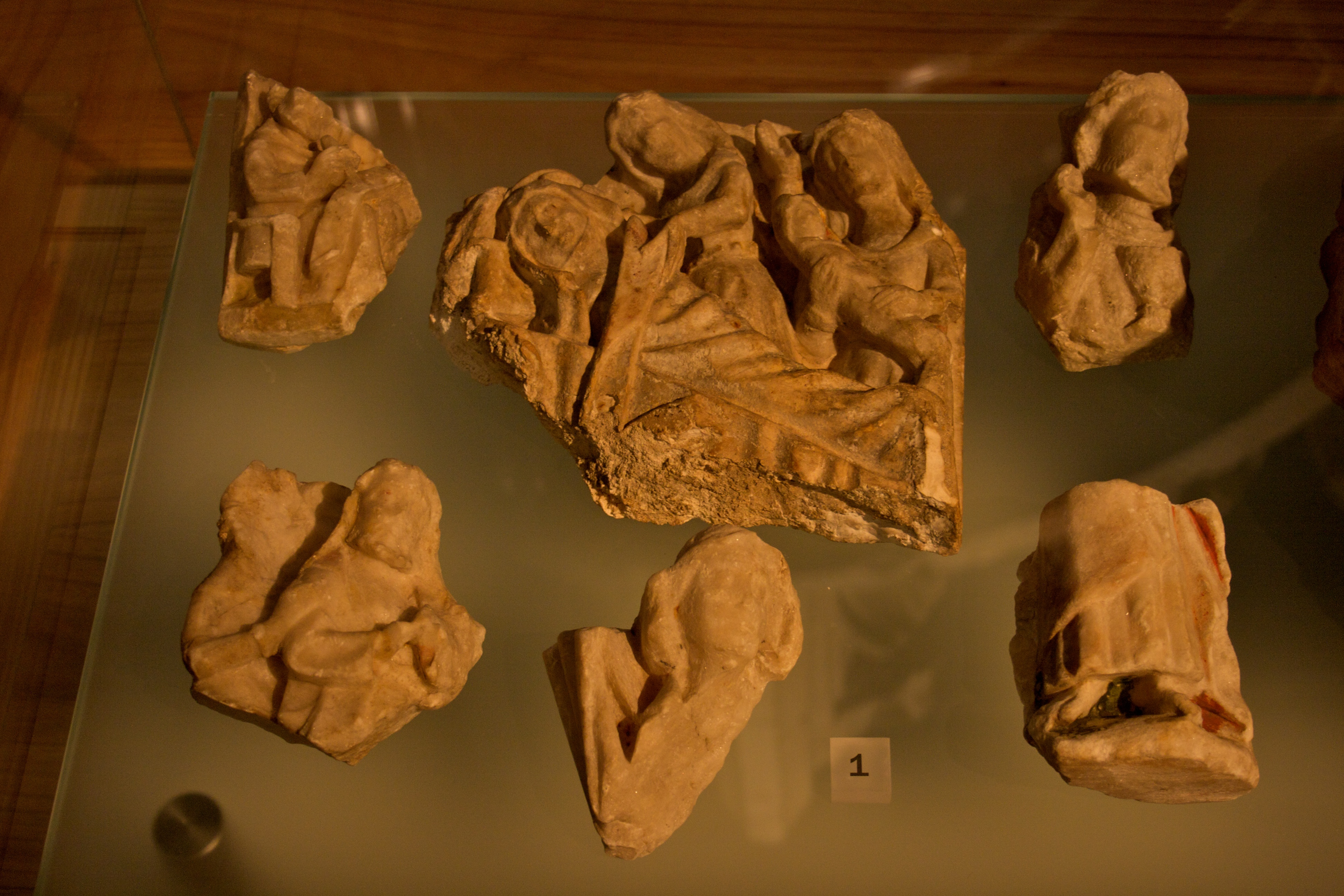
Altarpiece fragments c. 1300, found in a brick culvert in Hart Street (Museum of London)

Hart Street is a small street in the City of London. It runs west–east from Mark Lane to Crutched Friars and Seething Lane.

== Etymology ==
The name is believed to have been a variation on hearth, which may have been constructed and sold here during the Middle Ages. It is first recorded in 1348 as Herthstrete.

== History and buildings ==
The Lord Mayor of London, Richard Whittington was once believed to have lived on this street, but this has since been debunked.

St Olave's on Hart Street was the parish church of Samuel Pepys. It is traditionally believed to have been built on the site of the 1014 Battle of London Bridge, where Saint Olaf and Æthelred the Unready fought against a Viking raid. The church is primarily medieval in origin and was one of only a handful of City churches that escaped the Great Fire of London in 1666.

The Ship at No. 3 Hart Street opened in 1887, and has been a Grade II listed building since 1972.
