= St Mary Magdalen Old Fish Street =

Former church-site in London

Coordinates: 51°30′45″N 0°5′51″W

St. Mary Magdalen Old Fish Street
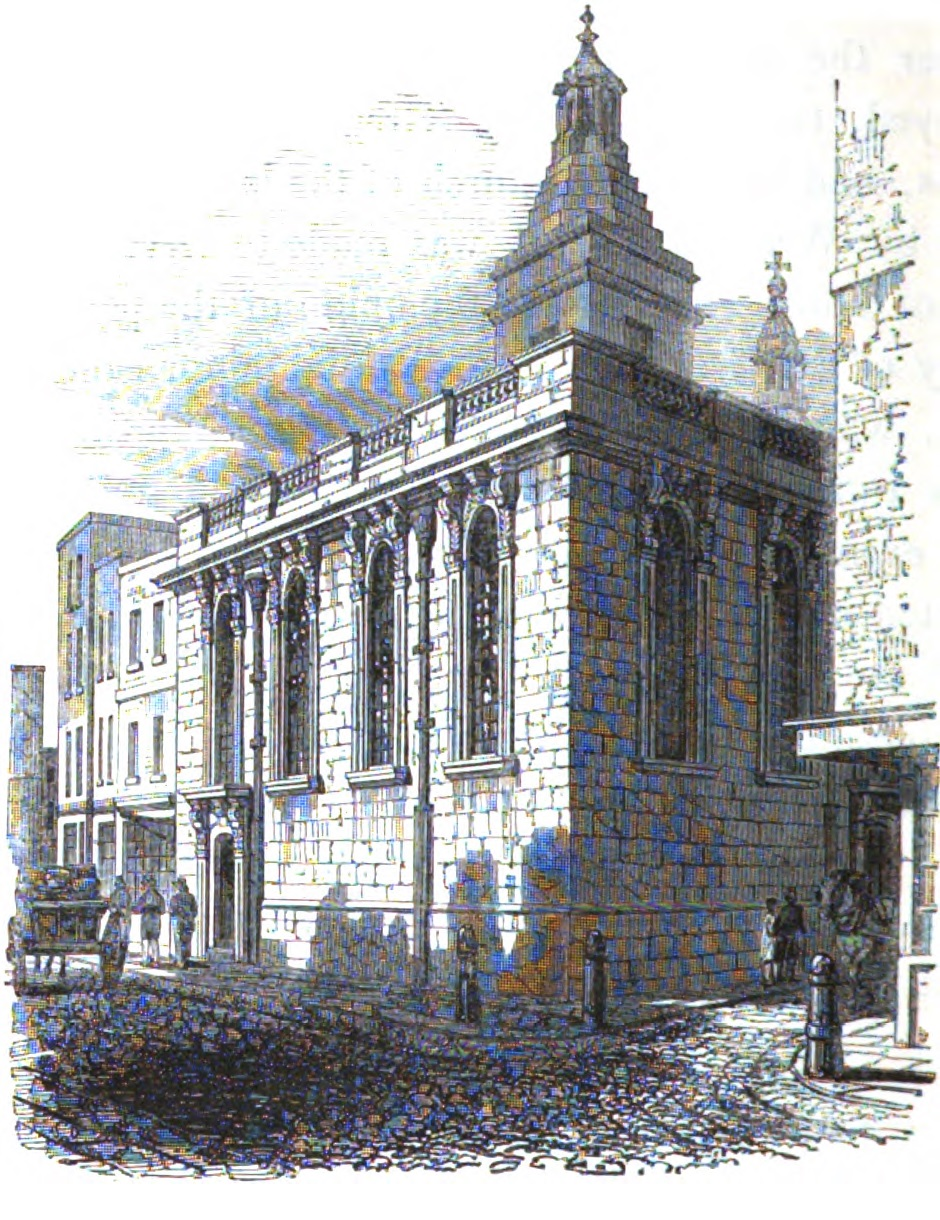
- St. Mary Magdalen Old Fish Street
- Location: Old Fish Street and Old Change, London
- Country: England
- Denomination: Church of England

Architecture
- Architect: Christopher Wren
- Style: Baroque
- Demolished: 1893

St. Mary Magdalen Old Fish Street was a church in Castle Baynard ward of the City of London, England, located on the corner of Old Fish Street and Old Change, on land now covered by post-War development. Recorded since the 12th century, the church was destroyed in the Great Fire of London of 1666, then rebuilt by the office of Sir Christopher Wren. The rebuilt church suffered damage to its roof from a fire in an adjacent warehouse in 1886. It was not repaired and was finally demolished in 1893.

== History ==
St. Mary Magdalen Old Fish Street was the only one of the eight churches in the post-Fire City of London named "St. Mary" to be dedicated to the penitent Mary Magdalene rather than the Virgin Mary. Old Fish Street formerly ran from the Thames towards St. Paul's Cathedral and was the location of a fish market since medieval times. The street was incorporated into Knightrider Street in 1872.

The earliest surviving reference to the church is in a document of 1181, as "St Mary Magdalen". Other medieval records refer to the church as "St. Marie Magdal in Piscaria apud sanctum Paulum", "St. Marie Magdal parish at the Fishmarket", "St. Marie Magdalen Eldefisshestrete" and "St. Mary Magdalen at Lamberdyshel".

Among the memorials in the pre-Fire church was a brass plaque of 1586, commemorating the merchant and benefactor, Thomas Berrie. The plaque survived the Great Fire and may now be seen in St Martin, Ludgate. In part it reads:

How smale soever the gift shall be/Thanke God for him who gave it thee/xii penie loves to xii poore foulkes/
Geve everie saboth day for aye

St Martin, Ludgate, also has the bread shelves from St. Mary Magdalen Old Fish Street.

On Easter Day 1653, John Evelyn recorded in his Diary that he and his family received Holy Communion at St. Mary Magdalen's. This was during the Protectorate when Anglican services were banned.

The church was destroyed in the Great Fire in 1666 and the parish combined with that of St Gregory by St Paul's, which was not rebuilt. Building of the new church began in 1683, with new foundations for the north wall and tower, but incorporating some of the old walls elsewhere. The work was completed in 1687 at a total cost of £4315. The construction was by Edward Strong the Elder.

Between 1824 and 1842, the rector of St. Mary Magdalen's was the Reverend Richard Harris Barham, author of The Ingoldsby Legends. He was buried in the church in 1845.

On the morning of Thursday, 2 December 1886, a fire broke out in a warehouse in what by this time was called Knightrider Street and spread to the church's roof, causing substantial damage. Although the church was insured and repairable, the event took place during a period in which several undamaged churches in the City of London were being demolished under the Union of Benefices Act 1860. The opportunity was taken to pull down St. Mary Magdalen's and combine the parish with that of St Martin, Ludgate, which received some of the furnishings from the demolished church.

The site previously occupied by St. Mary Magdalen's was built over after the Second World War, and is now covered by Old Change Square.

The parish still retains a clerkship, which is now in the gift of St. Andrew-by-the-Wardrobe.

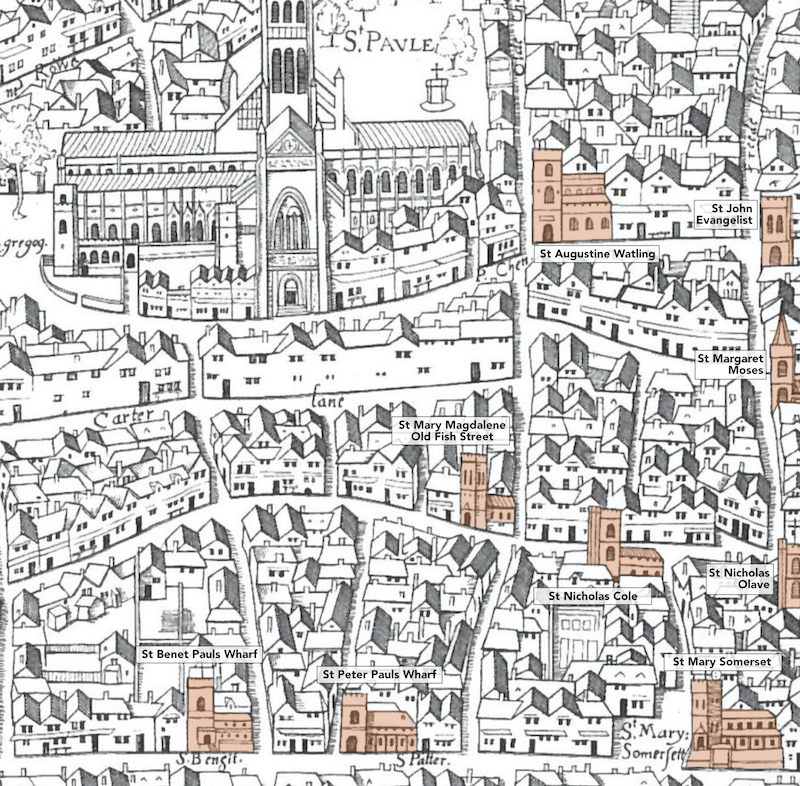
St Mary Magdalene Old Fish Street on the Copperplate map of London (centre right)

The church is the subject of a poem by John Betjeman, where the narrator is the Rector's warden. He refers to Wren's design as "a box with a fanciful plaster ceiling".

== Architecture ==
The plan for St. Mary Magdalen's was roughly rectangular, with the north wall tapering slightly towards the east. The two street frontages – to the east on Old Fish Street and to the south on Old Change – were faced with Portland stone. Underneath, the material was stone rubble. There were four large round-headed windows on the south, and three similar windows on the east, each window flanked by pilasters capped by volutes. Entry to the church was through a door under the western window on the south front. The roof was balustraded.

The tower was erected next to the north-western wall of the church and stood 86 ft. high. This had a stone spire, consisting of an octagonal pyramid of five steps, on which sat an open octagonal lantern from which emerged a concave steeple. The finial was in the form of an urn, in allusion to St Mary Magdalen's pot of balm. The inspiration for the spire's design was the Mausoleum at Halicarnassus, in modern-day Turkey.

== Organ ==
The organ by Samuel Green was installed in 1786. It was rebuilt in 1857 by Gray and Davison.

=== Organists ===
- Mary Hudson 1785–1801
- successor unknown.
- William Adams (between 1801 and 1815) – June 1834
- Frederick Michelmore (temporary) June – September 1834
- Carolina Townsend September 1834 – 1855
- J. S. Carter 1865
- E. Smyth 1881
- Douglas Stewart

== See also ==
- St Gregory by St Paul's was destroyed in the Great Fire of London in 1666 and not rebuilt; the parish was instead united with that of St Mary Magdalen Old Fish Street.
- List of Christopher Wren churches in London
- List of churches rebuilt after the Great Fire but since demolished
