= Richard Barham =

English cleric, novelist and poet (1788–1845)

Richard Harris Barham
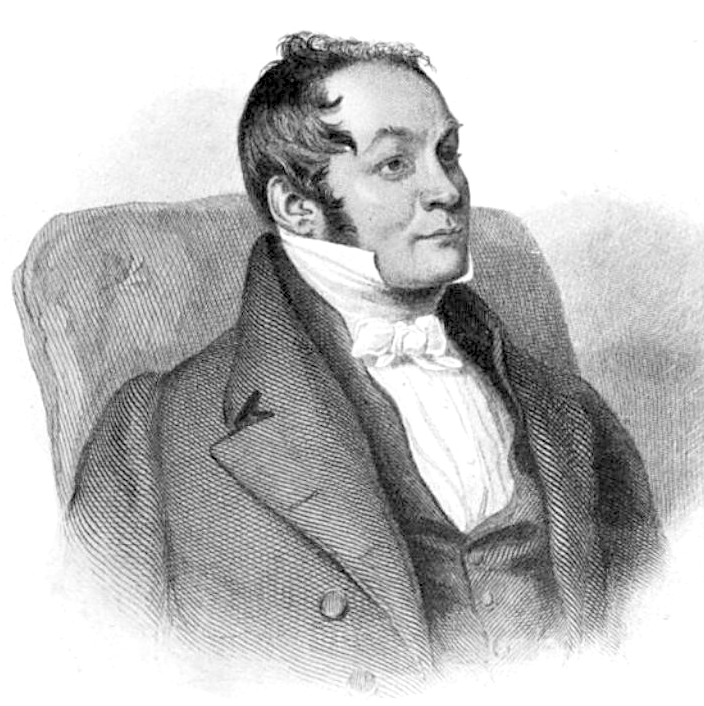
- Born: 6 December 1788; Canterbury, Kent, England
- Died: 17 June 1845 (aged 56); London, England
- Other names: Thomas Ingoldsby
- Occupations: cleric, novelist, humorous poet
- Notable work: Ingoldsby Legends

Richard Harris Barham (6 December 1788 – 17 June 1845) was an English cleric of the Church of England, a novelist and a humorous poet. He was known generally by his pseudonym Thomas Ingoldsby and as the author of The Ingoldsby Legends.

== Life ==
Richard Harris Barham was born in Canterbury. He was the illegitimate son of a local alderman, also called Richard Harris Barham and a woman named Elizabeth Ffox. When he was seven years old his father died, leaving him a small estate, part of which was the manor of Tappington, in Denton, Kent, mentioned frequently in his later work The Ingoldsby Legends. At nine he was sent to St Paul's School, but his studies were interrupted by an accident that partly crippled his arm for life. Deprived of vigorous bodily activity, he became a great reader and diligent student.

During 1807 he entered Brasenose College, Oxford, intending at first to study for the law, but deciding on a clerical career instead. In 1813 he was ordained and found a country curacy at Snargate in Romney Marsh, marrying Caroline Smart the following year. While there he wrote his first novel Baldwin, published in 1820. He began his second novel, My Cousin Nicholas, though this was not published until 1834.

in 1821 he moved to London (to 51 Great Queen Street), after gaining a minor canonry at London's St. Paul's Cathedral, where he served as a cardinal. Three years later he became one of the priests in ordinary of the King's Chapel Royal, appointed as rector of St Mary Magdalen and St Gregory by St Paul's, living at Amen Corner in St Paul's Churchyard.

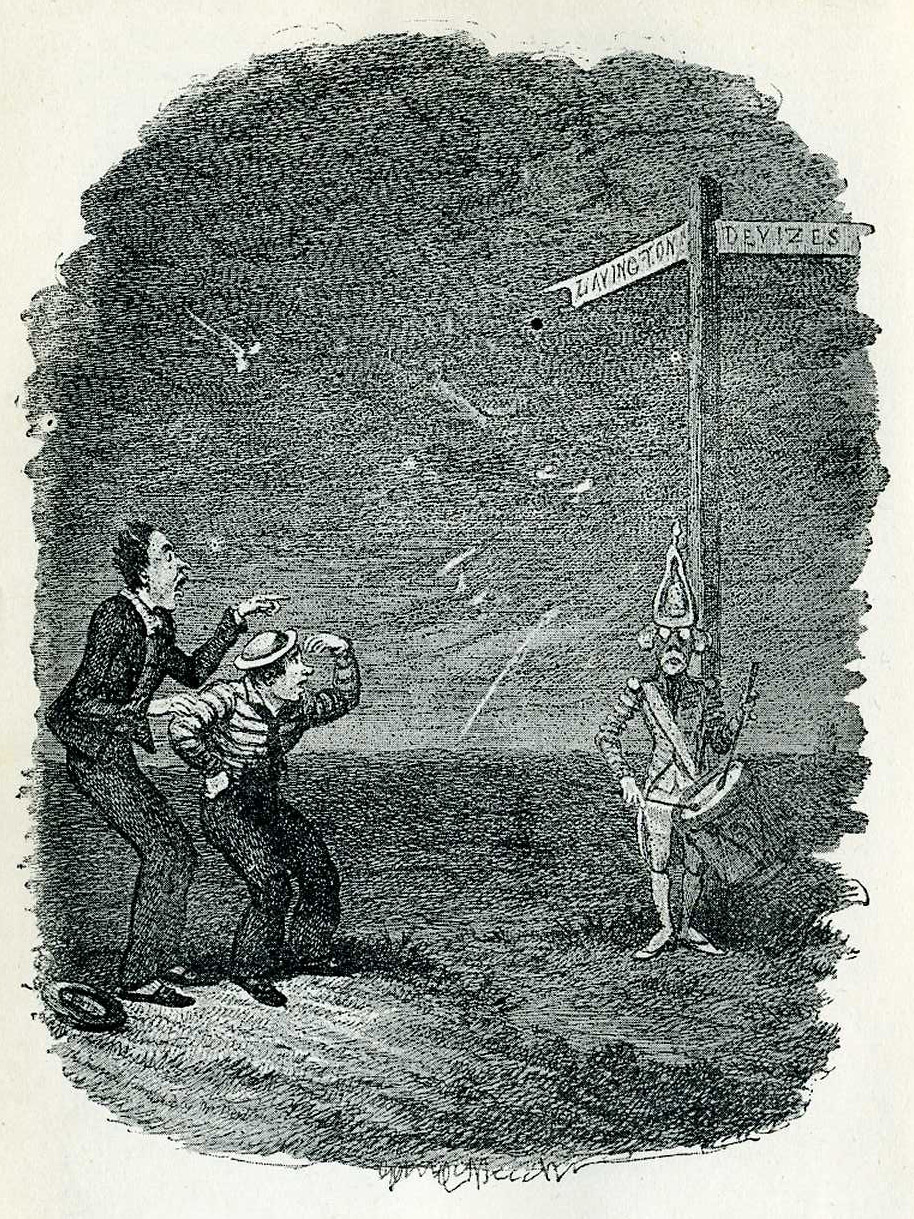
Illustration by George Cruikshank for the 'Dead Drummer of Salisbury Plain', one of The Ingoldsby Legends

He edited the London Chronicle in 1823, and in 1826 first contributed to Blackwood's Magazine. In 1837 he began to contribute to the recently founded Bentley's Miscellany a series of tales (mostly metrical, some in prose) known as The Ingoldsby Legends. These became popular and were published in collected form in three volumes between 1840 and 1847, and have since appeared in numerous editions. They may perhaps be compared to Hudibras. The stories are generally whimsical, but based on antiquarian learning. There is also a collection of Barham's miscellaneous poems, edited posthumously by his son, called The Ingoldsby Lyrics.

Barham was a political Tory, yet a lifelong friend of the liberal Sydney Smith and of Theodore Hook. Barham, a contributor to the Edinburgh Review, The Literary Gazette and John Gorton's Biographical Dictionary, also wrote a novel, My Cousin Nicholas (1834). He died in London on 17 June 1845, after a long and painful illness.

== Legacy ==
Barham is a character in George MacDonald Fraser's historical novel Flashman's Lady, he meets the main character, Harry Flashman, while watching a public execution.

His last poem As I laye a-thynkynge, was set to music by the English composer Edward Elgar, the song published in 1888. And in 1918 the composer Cyril Rootham set the same poem, for voice and piano.

There is a Wetherspoons pub in Burgate, Canterbury, near the cathedral, named The Thomas Ingoldsby.

There is a memorial to him at St Paul's Cathedral in London.
