= The Ship, Hart Street =

Pub in Aldgate, London

Coordinates: 51.510870°N 0.0799525°W

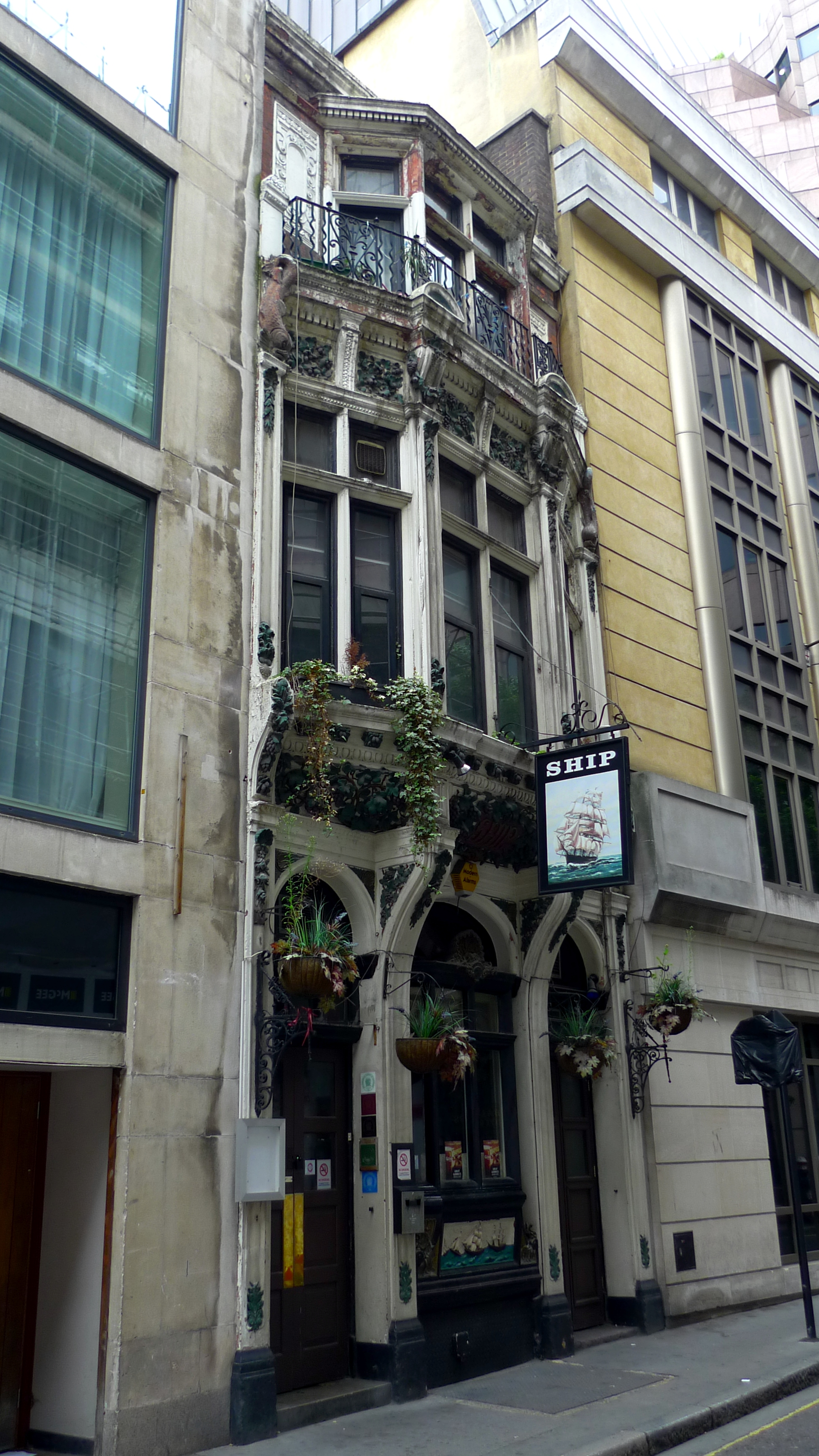
The Ship, Hart Street, London

The Ship is a Victorian-era pub at 3 Hart Street, Aldgate, London EC3.

It is a Grade II listed building, built in 1887.

The building has three storeys with one set back. There are elaborate painted doorways and moulded decoration. The pub participates in the CAMRA scheme. It sits between two newer buildings.
