= Catholic Association of Performing Arts =

British Catholic arts association

- Abbreviation: CaAPA
- Formation: 1911
- Legal status: Registered charity number: 267957
- Headquarters: Corpus Christi Church, 1-5 Maiden Lane, London, UK, WC2E 7NB
- President: Cardinal Vincent Nichols
- Chair: Richard O’Callaghan
- CaAPA National Chaplain: Fr Alan Robinson
- CaAPA Chairman of Trustees: Monsignor Vladimir Felzmann
- Website: https://catholicassociationofperformingarts.org.uk/
- Formerly called: The Catholic Stage Guild

The British Catholic Stage Guild, the main organisation for Catholics in British entertainment, was founded by Mgr Robert Hugh Benson in 1911. The Guild was renamed in 2009 and is now known as the Catholic Association of Performing Arts (CaAPA). The Guild is closely associated with Corpus Christi Catholic Church, Maiden Lane in London’s Covent Garden area.

Deceased former members of the Guild include actors Sir Alec Guinness (a former Vice-President of the Guild).

== Organisation ==
CaAPA is a Catholic association supporting performing arts professionals.

CaAPA works for and with people of all faiths and no faith. It aims to perform a dual role of serving the needs of both CaAPA members and the wider community through the members. Its members consist of theatre professionals and non-professionals interested in the performing arts. Members would use their talents to help the community, such as "putting on theatre productions to help people in their spiritual journeys and to raise funds for good causes."

== Activities ==
Past events have included a Memorial Mass for former Vice-President of the Guild, Michael Williams. Members of the Catholic Stage Guild and the English National Opera provided the entertainment; a fund-raising Quiz Night at Holy Apostles Church, Pimlico and a talk at the CAA, 20 Bedford Street, by Piers Paul Read, the official biographer of the Guild's late Vice-President, Sir Alec Guinness.
