= St Olave's Church, Hart Street =

Coordinates: 51°30′39.04″N 0°4′46.88″W

St Olave, Hart Street
- Ward Church of Saint Olave, Hart Street
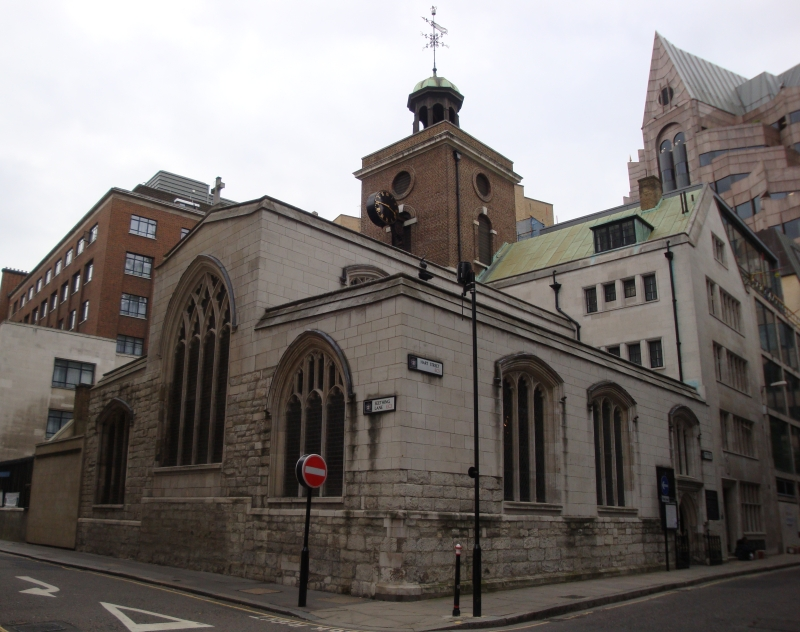
- View of the northern part of the church from Crutched Friars

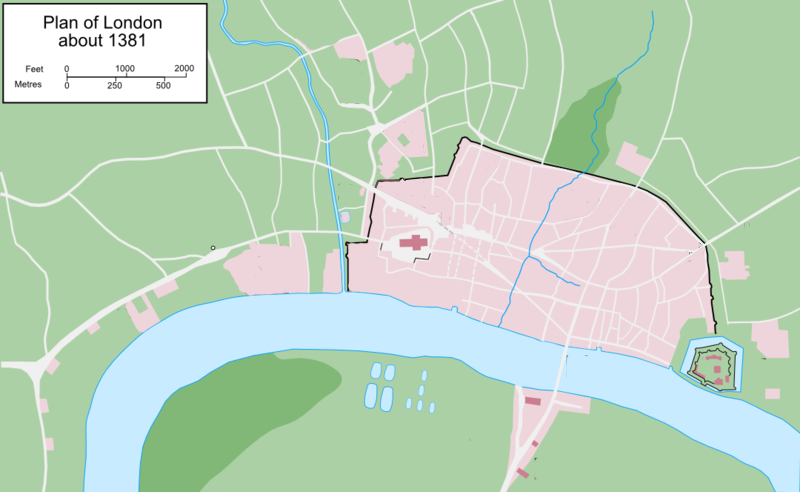
- Location within City of London Location within City of London in 1300
- OS grid reference: TQ 33372 80859
- Location: 8 Hart St, City of London, EC3
- Country: England
- Language: English
- Denomination: Church of England
- Previous denomination: Roman Catholic (to 1538)
- Website: saintolave.com

History
- Founded: 13th century or earlier
- Dedication: Saint Olaf

Architecture
- Heritage designation: Grade I listed building
- Style: Perpendicular Gothic
- Years built: 1450

Administration
- Diocese: London
- Archdeaconry: Archdeaconry of London
- Deanery: City of London Deanery
- Parish: St Olave Hart Street

St Olave's Church, Hart Street, is a Church of England church in the City of London, located on the corner of Hart Street and Seething Lane near Fenchurch Street railway station.

John Betjeman described St Olave's as "a country church in the world of Seething Lane." The church is one of the smallest in the city and is one of only a handful of medieval City churches that escaped the Great Fire of London in 1666. In addition to being a local parish church, St Olave's is the Ward Church of the Tower Ward of the City of London.

== History ==
The church is first recorded in the 13th century as St Olave-towards-the-Tower, a stone building replacing the earlier (presumably wooden) construction. It is dedicated to the patron saint of Norway, King Olaf II, who fought alongside the Anglo-Saxon King Æthelred the Unready against the Danes in the Battle of London Bridge in 1014. He was canonised after his 1028 death and the church of St Olave's was built apparently on the site of the battle. The Norwegian connection was reinforced during the Second World War when King Haakon VII of Norway worshipped there while in exile.

Saint Olave's was rebuilt in the 13th century and then again in the 15th century. The present building dates from around 1450. According to John Stow's Survey of London (1603), a major benefactor of the church in the late 15th century was wool merchant Richard Cely Sr. (d. 1482), who held the advowson on the church (inherited by his son, Richard Cely Jr.). On his death, Cely bequeathed money for making the steeple and an altar in the church. The merchant mark of the Cely family (famous for the Cely Letters of 1472–1488) was carved in two of the corbels in the nave (and were extant until the bombing of World War II). No memorial to the Celys now remains in the church.

Saint Olave's survived the Great Fire of London with the help of Sir William Penn, the father of the more famous William Penn who founded Pennsylvania, and his men from the nearby Naval yards. He had ordered the men to blow up the houses surrounding the church to create a fire break. The flames came within 100 yards or so of the building, but then the wind changed direction, saving the church and a number of other churches on the eastern side of the city.

The church was a favourite of the diarist Samuel Pepys, whose house and Royal Navy office were both on Seething Lane. A regular worshipper, he referred to St. Olave's in his diary affectionately as "our own church" In 1660, he had a gallery built on the south wall of the church and added an outside stairway from the Royal Navy Offices so that he could go to church without getting soaked by the rain. The gallery is now gone but a memorial to Pepys marks the location of the stairway's door. In 1669, when his beloved wife Elisabeth died from fever, Pepys had a marble bust of her made by John Bushnell and installed on the north wall of the sanctuary so that he would be able to see her from his pew at the services. In 1703, he was buried next to his wife in the nave.

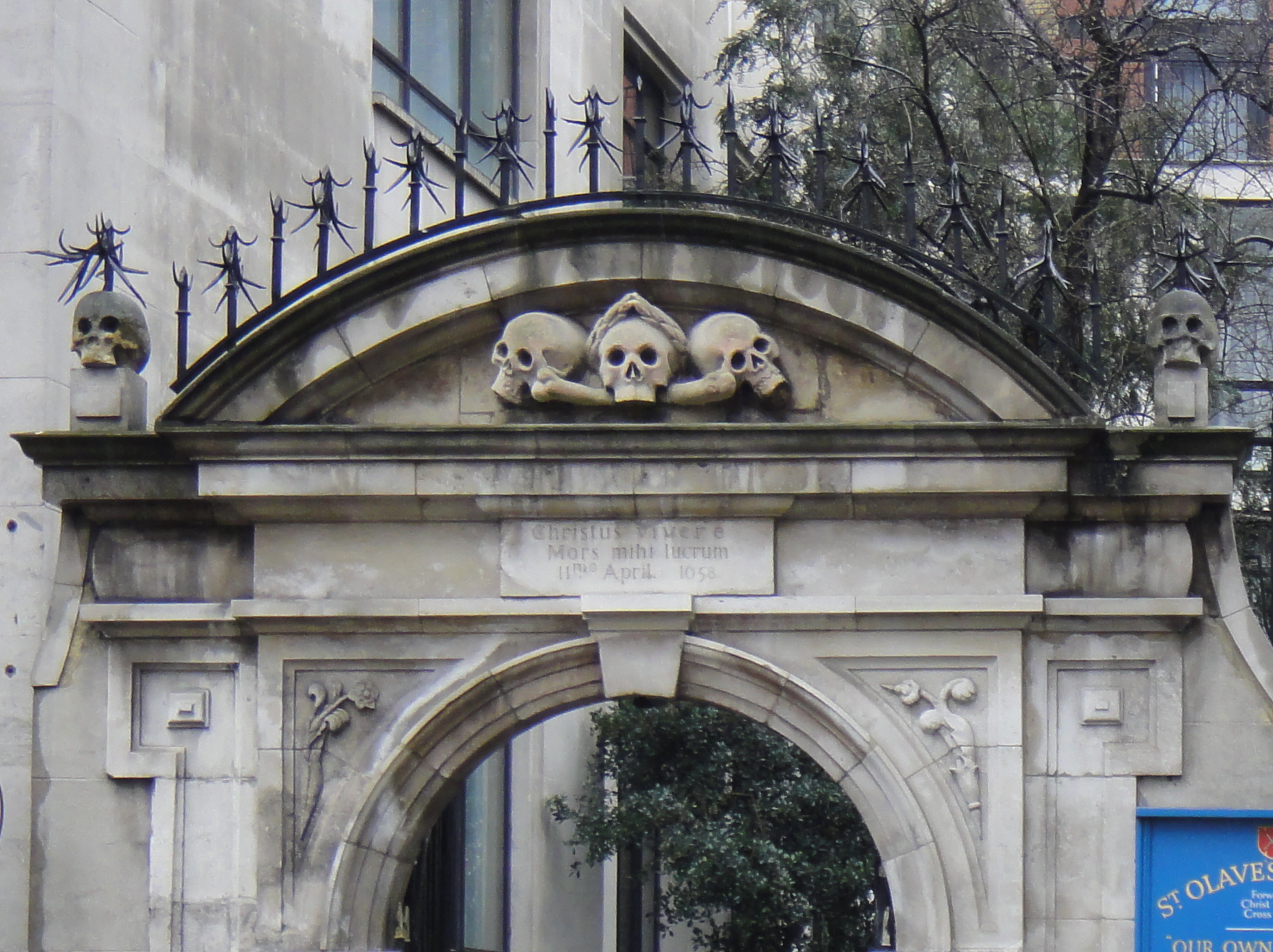
The famous gateway to Saint Olave's churchyard, described by Dickens as "Saint Ghastly Grim". It is dated 11 April 1658 and the Latin text is from Saint Paul's Epistle to the Philippians, chapter 1 verse 21: "For to me to live is Christ and to die is gain".

In his 1861 work, The Uncommercial Traveller, Charles Dickens described the 17th century gateway of Saint Olave's churchyard, which has skulls and crossbones carved in its tympanum, as being "one of my best beloved churchyards, I call the churchyard of Saint Ghastly Grim" and recounts once visiting it after midnight during a thunderstorm to see the skulls "having the air of a public execution".

The church was gutted by German bombs in 1941 during the London Blitz, and was restored in 1954, with King Haakon returning to preside over the rededication ceremony, during which he laid a stone from Trondheim Cathedral in front of the sanctuary.

Between 1948 and 1954, when the restored St Olave's was reopened, a prefabricated church stood on the site of All Hallows Staining. This was known as St Olave Mark Lane. The tower of All Hallows Staining was used as the chancel of the temporary church.

The church was designated a Grade I listed building on 4 January 1950. St Olave's has retained long and historic links with Trinity House and the Clothworkers' Company.

== Architecture ==
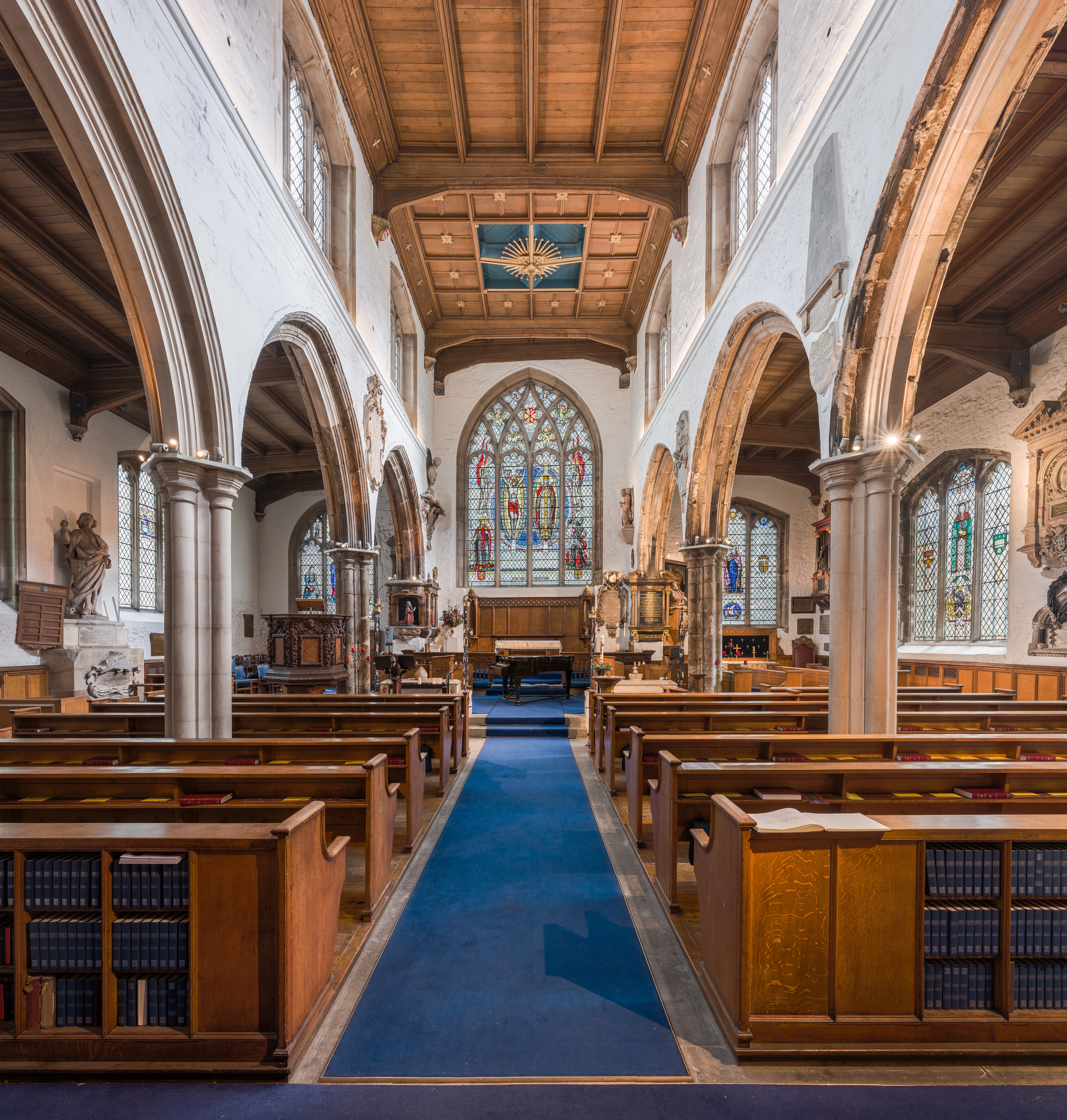
Interior of St Olave's Church

St Olave's has a modest exterior in the Perpendicular Gothic style. with a somewhat squat square tower of stone and brick, the latter added in 1732. It is famous for the macabre 1658 entrance arch to the churchyard, which is decorated with grinning skulls. The novelist Charles Dickens was so taken with this that he included the church in his book of sketches The Uncommercial Traveller, renaming it "St Ghastly Grim".

The interior of St Olave's only partially survived the wartime bombing; much of it dates from the restoration of the 1950s. It is nearly square, with three bays separated by columns of Purbeck limestone supporting pointed arches. The roof is a simple oak structure with bosses. Most of the church fittings are modern, but there are some significant survivals, such as the monument to Elizabeth Pepys and the pulpit, said to be the work of Grinling Gibbons. Following the destruction of the organ in the Blitz, the John Compton Organ Company built a new instrument in the West Gallery, fronted by a large wooden grille; this organ, and the rectory behind, is ingeniously structured between church and tower.

In the tower, there was a memorial with an American connection. It honours Monkhouse Davison and Abraham Newman, the grocers of Fenchurch Street who shipped crates of tea to Boston in late 1773. These crates were seized and thrown into the waters during the Boston Tea Party, one of the causes of the American War of Independence.

The oddest "person" said to be buried here is the pantomime character Mother Goose. Her burial was recorded by the parish registers on 14 September 1586. A plaque on the outside commemorates this event. The churchyard is also said to contain the grave of one Mary Ramsay, popularly believed to be the woman who brought the plague to London in 1665. The parish registers have the record of her burial, which was on 24 July 1665. Thereafter, in the same year, the victims of the Great Plague were marked with a 'p' after their names in the registers.

== Bells ==
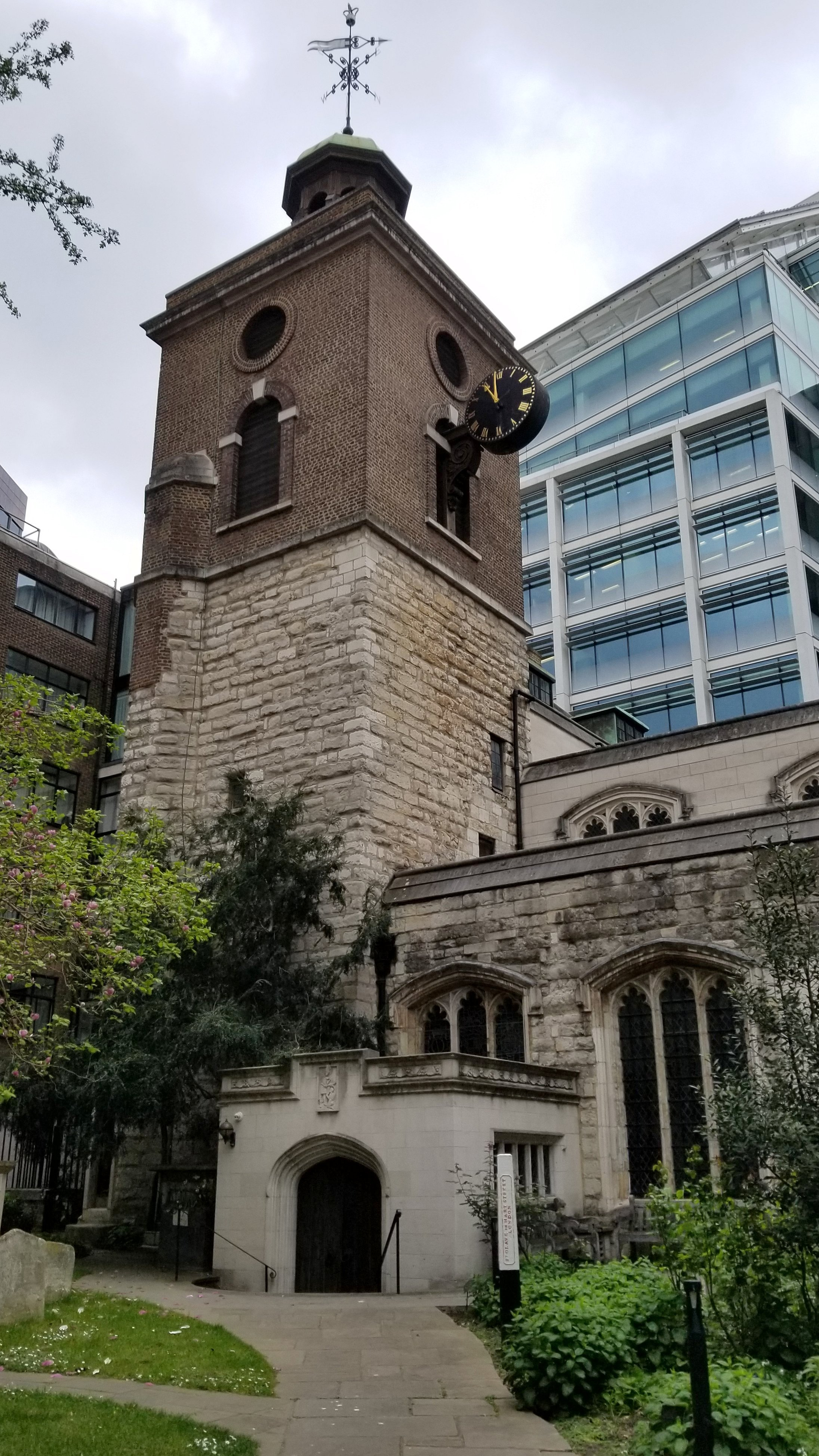
Exterior of the tower, south and east faces

On the east side of St Olave's, there is a stained glass window depicting Queen Elizabeth I standing with two tall bells at her feet. She held a thanksgiving service at St Olave's on Trinity Sunday, 15 May 1554, while she was still Princess Elizabeth, to celebrate her release from the Tower of London. She had originally given bell-ropes of silk to the All Hallows Staining Church because its bells had rung the loudest of all London bells on the day of her freedom, but, when All Hallows Staining was merged with St. Olave's in 1870, the bell-ropes went with it.

On 11 May 1941, an incendiary bomb was dropped by the Luftwaffe on the tower of the church. The tower, along with the baptistry and other buildings, was burned out and the furnishings and monuments destroyed. The heat was so great that even the peal of the eight bells were melted "back into bell metal". In the early 1950s, the bell metal was recast into new bells by the same foundry that created the original bells – the Whitechapel Bell Foundry, in 1662 and 1694. The new bells were then hung in the rebuilt tower.

There are currently nine bells at St Olave's Hart Street consisting of one Sanctus bell and a ring of eight bells hung for full circle ringing, with the tenor of the eight weighing 11–3–23. The bells are usually rung for practices, which take place on Thursday evenings between 7:00 pm and 8:30 pm during term time, and for Sunday service between 12:20 pm and 13:00 pm every Sunday. The bells are currently rung by the University of London Society of Change Ringers (ULSCR) who have a healthy band consisting of past and present members of London Universities, along with other regular supporters.

== Organ ==
An organ was built by Samuel Green and finished in 1781. Organists include Mary Hudson, William Shrubsole, and John Turene – all appointed 21 December 1781.

The 1781 organ was destroyed in the Blitz in 1941. After the war, a new organ was built behind a wooden grille in the west gallery by the John Compton Organ Company in 1954. It was built on the extension principle with six ranks. in 1957 three additional ranks were added. It now has 43 stops controlled from a drawstop console in the west gallery.

== Peter Turner ==
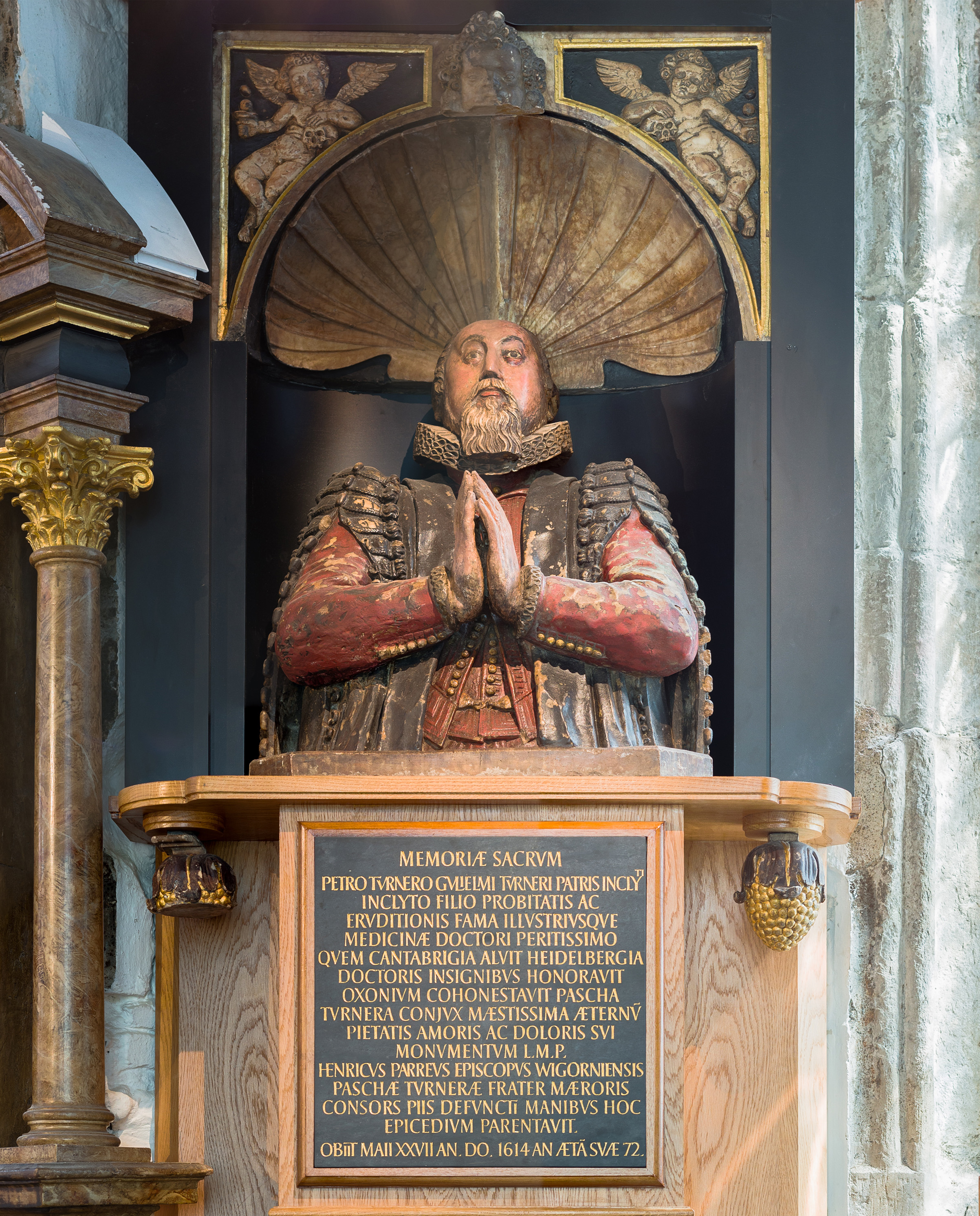
The memorial effigy of Peter Turner at St Olave Hart Street Church in 2014

Peter Turner was a notable physician in the 16th and early 17th century and adherent of Paracelsus, and was buried in the church along with his father William Turner, also a famed physician and naturalist. When he died in 1614, a memorial bust was crafted and placed in the south-east corner of the church. When the church was gutted during the Blitz, the bust went missing. It was not seen until April 2010 when it reappeared at a UK art auction. When it was recognised, the sale was frozen and negotiations took place via the Art Loss Register to return the bust to the church. It was finally returned to its original location within St Olave's in 2011 after an absence of more than 70 years.

== Notable people associated with the church ==
- Queen Elizabeth I held a thanksgiving service here in 1554 on the day of her release from the nearby Tower of London.
- An Inuk man, the first Inuk to come to England when he was captured during Martin Frobisher's first voyage in search of the Northwest Passage in 1576, was buried here in late October the same year. An Inuk child, captured during Frobisher's second expedition the following year and known as Nutaaq, was also buried here in late November 1577.
- Sir Philip Sidney, the poet, had his daughter Elizabeth christened in this church in 1585.
- Sir Francis Walsingham, Queen Elizabeth I's spymaster, lived across the street from this church, and his house was mentioned several times by the church's records as the place for baptisms, marriages and funerals.
- John Lumley, 1st Baron Lumley, collector of artworks and books: "The Lord Lumlie died here at his howse on 11 Aprill, 1609" but his body was brought to Cheam, Surrey for burial.
- Anthony Bacon, diplomat and intellectual, brother of Francis Bacon, was buried at this church in 1601.
- Robert Devereux, 3rd Earl of Essex, grandson of Sir Francis Walsingham and English Civil War general, was baptised at the house of Sir Francis's widow and noted in the parish registers of this church in 1590.
- Ann, Lady Fanshawe, memoirist, wrote in her memoirs, "I was born in St. Olaves, Hart Street, London, in a house that my father took of the Lord Dingwall" on 25 March 1625. and baptised on 7 April 1625 at this church as Ann Harrison.
- Samuel Pepys, diarist, was buried at this church in 1703 next to his wife, Elisabeth Pepys, who predeceased him.
- King Haakon VII of Norway worshipped here from 1940 to 1945, while Norway was occupied by Nazi Germany.

== Gallery ==
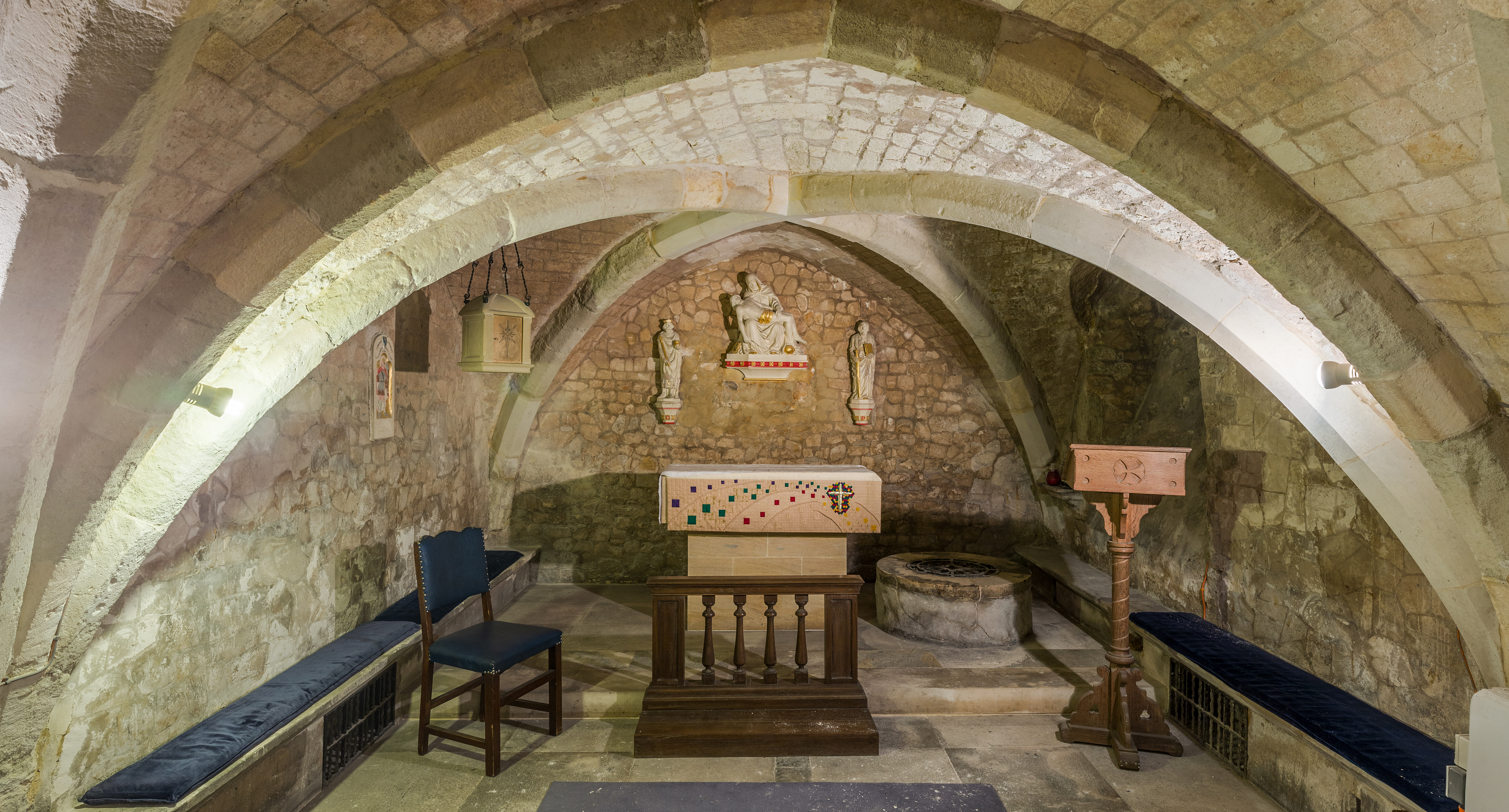
The crypt

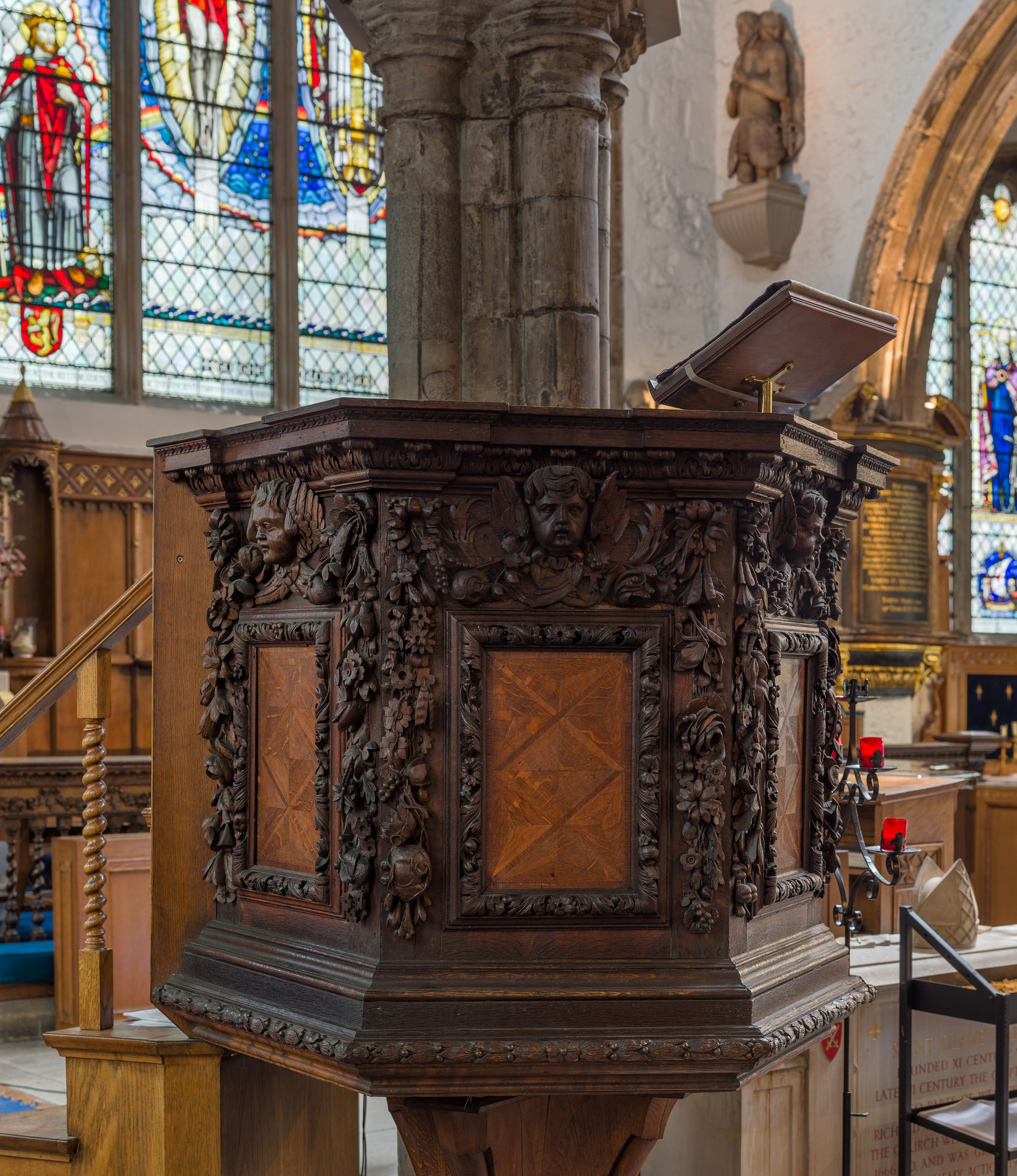
The pulpit, with wood carving detail

== See also ==
- List of buildings that survived the Great Fire of London
- List of churches and cathedrals of London
