= As I laye a-thynkynge =

Poem by Richard Barham

"As I laye a-thynkynge" is the last poem written by "Thomas Ingoldsby" (Richard Barham). It was set to music by the English composer Edward Elgar.

The song was published in 1888 by Beare & Son, though may have been written in the previous year. It is a song for soprano or tenor.

== Lyrics ==
Elgar omitted the two verses enclosed in square brackets [ ] – the fifth and sixth verses of the poem.

AS I LAYE A-THYNKYNGE

As I laye a-thynkynge, a-thynkynge, a-thynkynge,
Merrie sang the Birde as she sat upon the spraye!
There came a noble Knyghte,
With his hauberke shynynge brighte,
And his gallant heart was lyghte,
Free and gaye;
As I laye a-thynkynge, he rode upon his waye.

As I laye a-thynkynge, a-thynkynge, a-thynkynge,
Sadly sang the Birde as she sat upon the tree!
There seemed a crimson plain,
Where a gallant Knyghte lay slayne,
And a steed with broken rein
Ran free,
As I laye a-thynkynge, most pitiful to see!

As I laye a-thynkynge, a-thynkynge, a-thynkynge,
Merrie sang the Birde as she sat upon the boughe;
A lovely Mayde came by,
And a gentil youth was nyghe,
And he breathed many a syghe
And a vowe;
As I laye a-thynkynge, her heart was gladsome now.

As I laye a-thynkynge, a-thynkynge, a-thynkynge,
Sadly sang the Birde as she sat upon the thorne;
No more a youth was there,
But a Maiden rent her haire,
And cried out in sad despaire,
'That I was borne!'
As I laye a-thynkynge, she perished forlorne.

[ As I laye a-thynkynge, a-thynkynge, a-thynkynge,
Sweetly sang the Birde as she sat upon the briar;
There came a lovely Childe,
And his face was meek and mild,
Yet joyously he smiled
On his sire;
As I laye a-thynkynge, a Cherub mote admire.

But I laye a-thynkynge, a-thynkynge, a-thynkynge,
And sadly sang the Birde as it perch'd upon a bier;
That joyous smile was gone,
And that face was white and wan,
As the downe upon the Swan
Doth appear
As I laye a-thynkynge - oh! bitter flow'd the tear! ]

As I laye a-thynkynge the golden sun was sinking,
O merrie sang that Birde as it glittered on her breast
With a thousand gorgeous dyes,
While soaring to the skies,
'Mid the stars she seem'd to rise,
As to her nest;
As I laye a-thynkynge, her meaning was exprest:-
'Follow, follow me away,
It boots not to delay,'-
'Twas so she seem'd to saye,
'HERE IS REST!'

— T. I.
