= Karin Jonzen =

British artist (1914–1998)

Karin Margareta Jonzen
- Born: Karin Margareta Löwenadler; 22 December 1914; London, England
- Died: 29 January 1998 (aged 83)
- Education: Slade School of Art; Royal Academy Stockholm; City and Guilds Art School
- Known for: Sculpture
- Spouses: Basil Jonzen (m. 1944 – divorced); Ake Sucksdorff (m. 1972)

Karin Margareta Jonzen, née Löwenadler, (22 December 1914 – 29 January 1998) was a British figure sculptor whose works, in bronze, terracotta and stone, were commissioned by a number of public bodies in Britain and abroad.

== Biography ==
Karin Löwenadler was born in London to Swedish parents and attended the Slade School of Art from 1933 to 1936. At the Slade she won prizes in both painting and sculpture and decided to abandon her original ambition to become a cartoonist and concentrate on sculpture. Jonzen continued her studies at the Royal Academy Stockholm and at the City and Guilds Art School in Kennington during 1939. That same year she won the Prix de Rome, but the beginning of World War II prevented her making use of the travelling scholarship it conferred. During the war she worked as a Civil Defence ambulance driver until she developed rheumatic fever and was given a medical discharge. While recovering Jonzen became convinced that modernism and abstract sculpture was not the way to advance her art and decided to focus on figurative works.

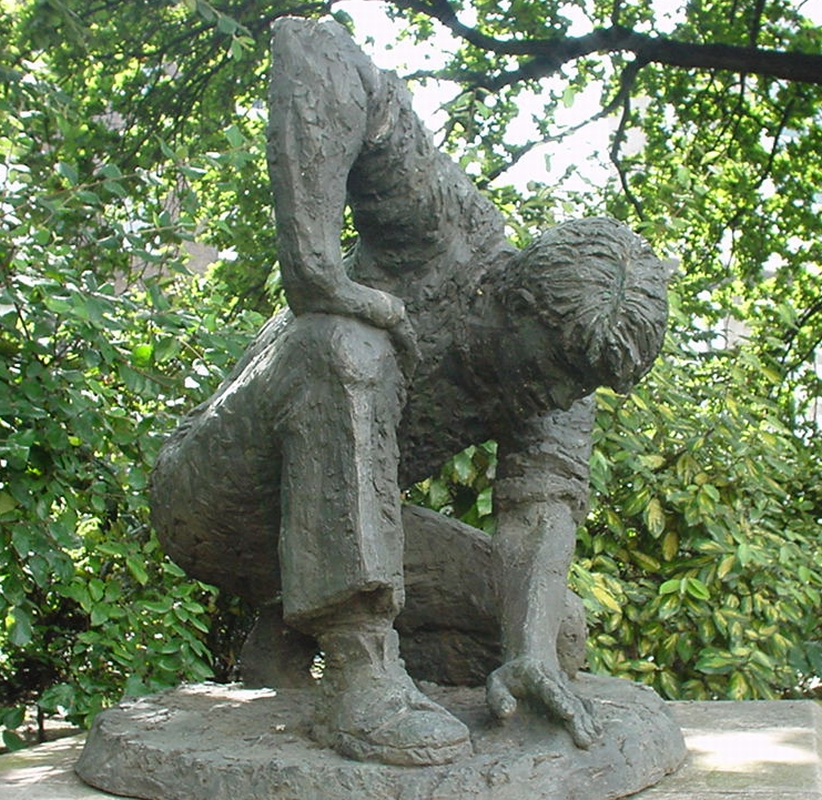
The Gardener (1971), located by London Wall

After the war Jonzen's figures and sculptures were bought by some important art collectors, including Robert Sainsbury and Kenneth Clark, although otherwise commercial galleries showed little interest in her work. In 1948 she won the Royal Society of British Sculptors' Feodora Gleichen Award for women artists. A number of high-profile public commissions followed. The Arts Council commissioned her to produce a sculpture for the newly built Southbank Centre and the World Health Organization commissioned works from her for its centres in New Delhi and Geneva. A standing figure was commissioned for the Festival of Britain in 1951. Jonzen also participated in the Some Contemporary British Sculpture exhibition organised by the Arts Council in 1956.

Jonzen entered three pieces for the 1968 Sculpture in the City exhibition which was part of that year's City of London Festival. This led to her receiving two commissions from the Corporation of the City of London including her 1972 group Beyond Tomorrow outside the Guildhall. Jonzen was offered the commission on the basis of a small model and subsequently completed the full-size version but was in Sweden when the foundry casting was made. She was disappointed with the casting and had it re-cast, in bronze resin, at her own expense. This version greatly impressed Lord Blackford, a member of the Corporation, to the extant that he paid for a new bronze casting which is the version displayed outside the Guidhall. Jonzen's other commission from the Corporation was for The Gardener, a piece designed to celebrate the work of the Corporation's Trees, Gardens and Open Spaces Committee. The chair of that committee, Frederick Cleary, was also the Treasurer of the Samuel Pepys Club and in that role he commissioned Jonzen to produce a bust of Pepys for Seething Lane Garden.

Jonzen's figurative skills were greatly suited to church sculpture and both Guildford Cathedral and St Mary-le-Bow in London have figures by Jonzen, while the College Chapel at Selwyn College in Cambridge has her 1958 three-figure Ascension group. Subjects of her portrait busts include Paul Scofield, Max Von Sydow, Malcolm Muggeridge and Dame Ninette de Valois, as well as Sir Hugh Casson and Sir A. P. Herbert. The National Portrait Gallery in London holds her bronze bust of Learie Constantine, while the Tate collection includes her 1947/1948 terracotta Head of a Youth. Other works by Jonzen are also held by art galleries in Bradford, Glasgow, Brighton, Southend and in Melbourne, Australia.

Jonzen exhibited on a regular basis at the Royal Academy, with the London Group, the New English Art Club and at the Royal Society of British Artists. She lectured, part-time, on art and art appreciation for the extra-mural department of London University from 1965 to 1970, and at the Camden Arts Centre between 1968 and 1972. Solo exhibitions were held at the Fieldbourne Gallery in London in 1974 and at David Messum Fine Art in 1994.

Academician, Gilbert Ledward, nominated Jonzen for membership of the Royal Academy of Arts on 21 April 1949, she was re-nominated in March 1957, however failing to attract sufficient voters her proposal lapsed seven years later in 1964 in accordance with the Royal Academy's regulations.

Jonzen was married twice, firstly to Basil Jonzen, a well-regarded artist and art collector in his own right, whom she married in 1944 and with whom she ran a successful art gallery for a time. After they divorced she married a former boyfriend, a poet called Ake Sucksdorff who she had first met in 1938.

== Selected public artworks ==
Image	Title / subject	Location and coordinates	Date	Type	Designation	Notes
	Mother and Child	Sydenham Hill Estate, London	1961	Statue		A commission by the London County Council, situated outside a community centre, where a mother and baby clinic was held. In 1970 the work was reported stolen.
More images	Learie Constantine, Baron Constantine	National Portrait Gallery, London	1971	Bronze bust		
More images	The Gardener	London Wall, City of London 51.5172°N 0.0925°W	1971–1972	Bronze statue		
More images	Beyond Tomorrow	Guildhall Piazza, City Of London 51.5161°N 0.0919°W	1972	Bronze sculptural group		
	Pieta	The Church of Sweden, London	1975	Bronze resin statue		
	Young Girl	Sloane Gardens, London	1980	Bronze statue		
	Samuel Pepys	Seething Lane Garden, London	1983	Bust on pedestal		
	St. Tarcisius	Corpus Christi Roman Catholic Church, Maiden Lane, London		Statue		
	St. Anne and Mary	St. Anne's Church, Lewes	1990	Statue		
	Mother and Child	St Mary-le-Bow, City of London		Bronze statue		
	Young Women Contemplating	The Church of Sweden, London		Half-figure		

== Group exhibitions ==
- Exhibition of Open Air Sculpture 1948;
- Tate Gallery 'The Four Seasons'; Tate Gallery
- 'Contemporary Religious Art'; City of London Festival 1968;
- Fieldborne Galleries 29 May to 19 June 1974
