= The Ingoldsby Legends =

Collection of myths, legends, ghost stories and poems

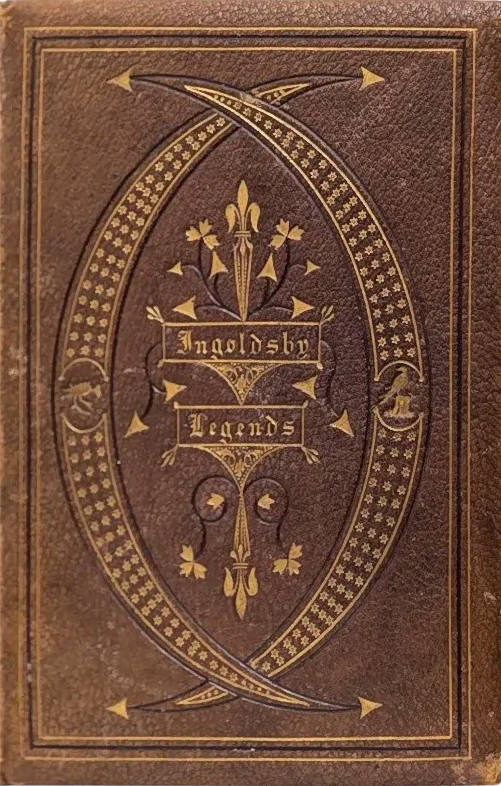
- Cover of an 1864 copy of The Ingoldsby Legends
- Author: Thomas Ingoldsby
- Language: English
- Genre: Humorous verse and prose short stories
- Publisher: R. Bentley & Son
- Publication date: 1840, 1842, 1847
- Publication place: United Kingdom
- Media type: Print (Hardback)
- Pages: 3 vols.

The Ingoldsby Legends (full title: The Ingoldsby Legends, or Mirth and Marvels) is a collection of myths, legends, ghost stories and poems written supposedly by Thomas Ingoldsby of Tappington Manor, actually a pen-name of an English clergyman named Richard Harris Barham.

== Background ==
The legends were first printed during 1837 as a regular series in the magazine Bentley's Miscellany and later in The New Monthly Magazine. They proved immensely popular and were compiled into books published by Richard Bentley in 1840, 1842 and 1847. They remained popular during the 19th century, when they ran through many editions. They were illustrated by artists including George Cruikshank, John Leech and John Tenniel; and Arthur Rackham (1898 edition). A two-volume scholarly edition, edited and annotated by Carol Hart, was published in 2013 by SpringStreet Books (Philadelphia).

As a priest of the Chapel Royal, with a private income, Barham was not troubled with strenuous duties, and he had ample time to read, and to compose his stories and poems. Although the "legends" are based on folklore or other pre-existing sources, chiefly Kentish, such as the "hand of glory", they are mostly humorous parodies or pastiches.

== Content ==
Barham introduces the collection with the statement that "The World, according to the best geographers, is divided into Europe, Asia, Africa, America and Romney Marsh".

The best-known poem in the collection is "The Jackdaw of Rheims", which is about a jackdaw that steals a cardinal's ring and is made a saint under the name Jem Crow.

A popular prose story is that of "Grey Dolphin", a horse who helps save the life of his master, Sir Ralph de Shurland, by swimming to obtain a royal pardon for Sir Ralph's murder of a priest; but is then beheaded after a "hag" predicts that he will be the cause of Sir Ralph's death. Three years later, Sir Ralph encounters Grey Dolphin's skull and kicks it contemptuously, only for a tooth to pierce his foot and cause an infection, from which he dies – so fulfilling the prophecy. The tale is based on the traditional Isle of Sheppey legend of Sir Robert de Shurland, combined with another local legend of a drowned seaman buried but then exhumed at Chatham, and with the addition of much imaginative detail. In an introductory note added to the story in 1840 (and writing as "Thomas Ingoldsby"), Barham claims descent from Sir Ralph de Shurland, and a right to bear the Shurland coat of arms alongside his own, which he does on the volume's title page.

Many of the tales include brief jocular and derisory references to an antiquary named "Mr Simpkinson": this was a satirical version of the real-life antiquary John Britton.

=== List of chapters ===
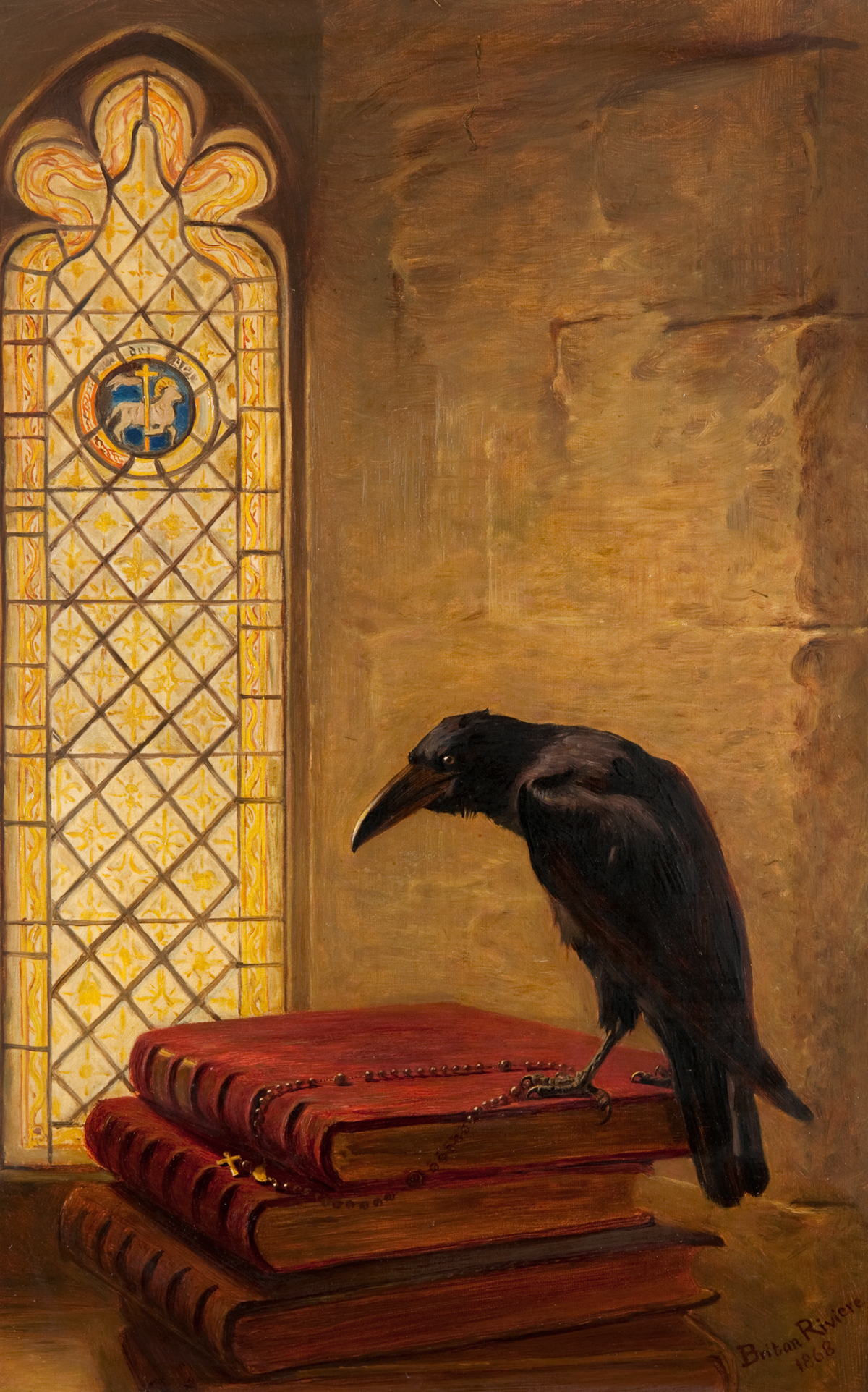
A Saint, from the "Jackdaw of Rheims", by Briton Rivière, 1868

The chapters are made up of:

- "The Spectre of Tappington"
- "The Nurse's Story: the Hand of Glory"
- "Patty Morgan the Milkmaid's Story: 'Look at the Clock!'"
- "Grey Dolphin: a legend of Sheppey"
- "The Ghost"
- "The Cynotaph"
- "The Leech of Folkestone: Mrs Botherby's Story"
- "The Legend of Hamilton Tighe"
- "The Witches' Frolic"
- "A Singular Passage in the Life of the Late Henry Harris, Doctor in Divinity"
- "The Jackdaw of Rheims"
- "A Lay of St Dunstan"
- "A Lay of St Gengulphus"
- "The Lay of St Odille"
- "A Lay of St Nicholas"
- "The Lady Rohesia"
- "The Tragedy"
- "Mr. Barney Maguire's Account of the Coronation"
- "The 'Monstre' Balloon"
- "The Execution: A Sporting Anecdote"
- "Some Account of a New Play"
- "Mr Peters's Story: the Bagman's Dog"
- "Introduction to the Second Series"
- "The Black Mousquetaire: a legend of France"
- "Sir Rupert the Fearless: a legend of Germany"
- "The Merchant of Venice: a legend of Italy"
- "The Auto-Da-Fé: a legend of Spain"
- "The Ingoldsby Penance!: a legend of Palestine and West Kent"
- "Netley Abbey: a legend of Hampshire"
- "Fragment"
- "Nell Cook: a legend of the Dark Entry – the King's Scholar's story"
- "Nursery Reminiscences"
- "Aunt Fanny: a legend of a shirt"
- "Misadventures at Margate: a legend of Jarvis's Jetty"
- "The Smuggler's Leap: a legend of Thanet"
- "Bloudie Jacke of Shrewsberrie: a legend of Shropshire"
- "The Babes in the Woody; or, the Norfolk Tragedy"
- "The Dead Drummer: a legend of Salisbury Plain"
- "A Row in an Omnibus Box: a legend of the Haymarket"
- "The Lay of St Cuthbert; or the Devil's Dinner-Party: a legend of the North Countree"
- "The Lay of St Aloys: a legend of Blois"
- "The Lay of the Old Woman Clothed in Grey: a legend of Dover"
- "Raising the Devil: a legend of Cornelius Agrippa"
- "Saint Medard: a legend of Africa"
- "Preface to the Third Series"
- "The Lord of Thoulouse: a legend of Languedoc"
- "The Wedding-Day; or, The Buccaneer's Curse: a family legend"
- "The Blasphemer's Warning: a lay of St Romwold"
- "The Brothers Of Birchington: a lay of St Thomas à Becket"
- "The Knight and the Lady: a domestic legend of the reign of Queen Anne"
- "The House-Warming!!: a legend of Bleeding-Heart Yard"
- "The Forlorn One"
- "Jerry Jarvis's Wig: a legend of the Weald of Kent"
- "Unsophisticated Wishes"
- "Miscellaneous Poems"

== See also ==
- Edward Lear
- Merry England
- Minstrelsy of the Scottish Border
- Thomas Hood
