= Corpus Christi Catholic Church, Maiden Lane =

Catholic parish in London

Corpus Christi
- Corpus Christi Catholic Church, Maiden Lane
- Corpus Christi Shrine Church
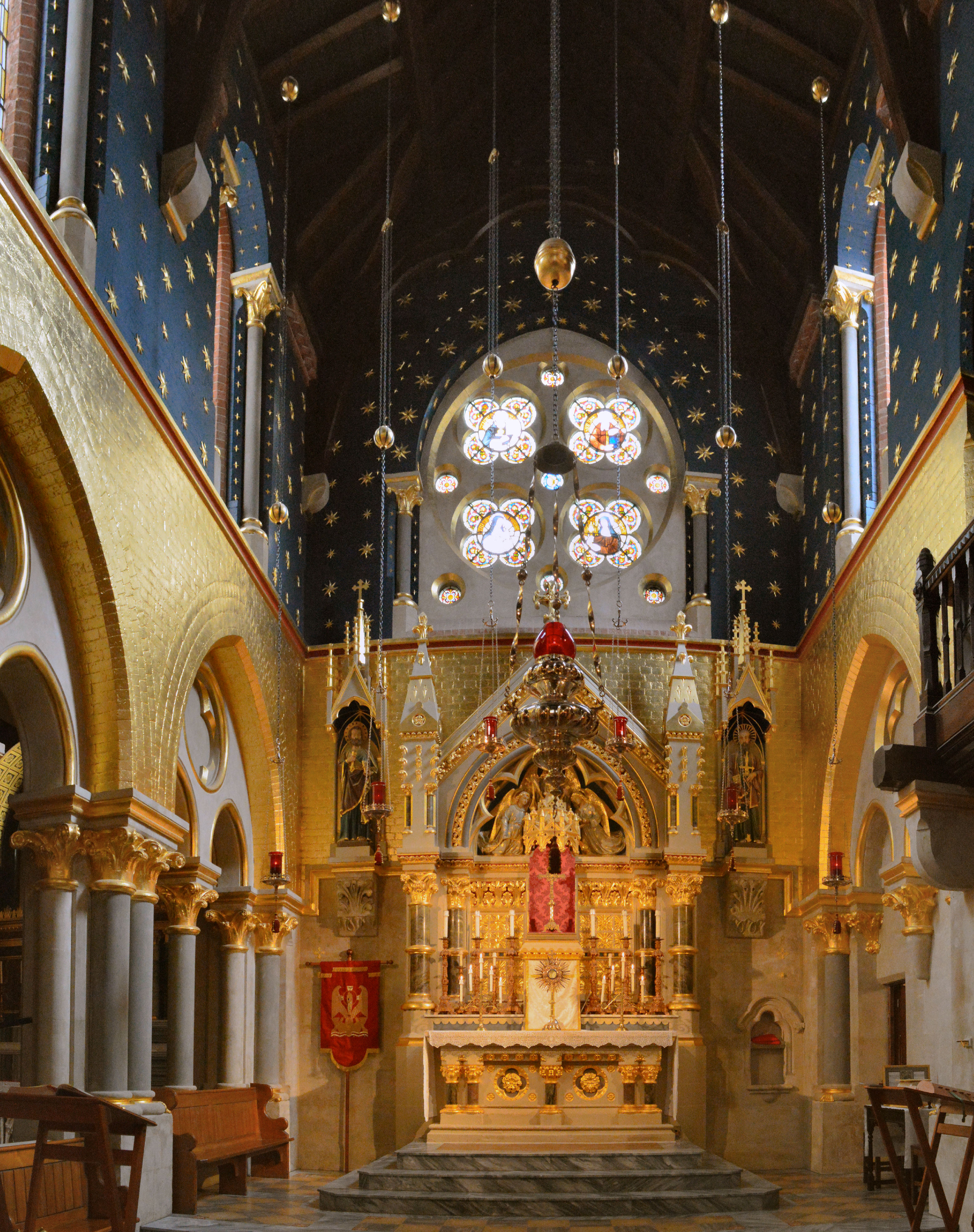
- High Altar of Corpus Christi during Exposition of the Blessed Sacrament

- Shown within Central London
- 51°30′39″N 0°07′21″W
- Location: Maiden Lane, Covent Garden, Westminster; London, WC2E
- Country: England
- Denomination: Catholic Church
- Tradition: Roman Rite
- Website: corpuschristimaidenlane.org.uk

History
- Status: Diocesan Shrine of the Blessed Sacrament
- Founded: 20 October 1874
- Founder: Henry Edward Cardinal Manning
- Dedication: Corpus Christi
- Consecrated: 18 October 1956

Architecture
- Functional status: Active
- Heritage designation: Grade II
- Architect: F. H. Pownall
- Architectural type: Shrine Church
- Years built: 1873-1874

Specifications
- Materials: Brick

Administration
- Province: Westminster
- Archdiocese: Westminster
- Deanery: Westminster
- Parish: Covent Garden

Clergy
- Archbishop: Vincent Nichols
- Rector: Fr Alan Robinson, KHS

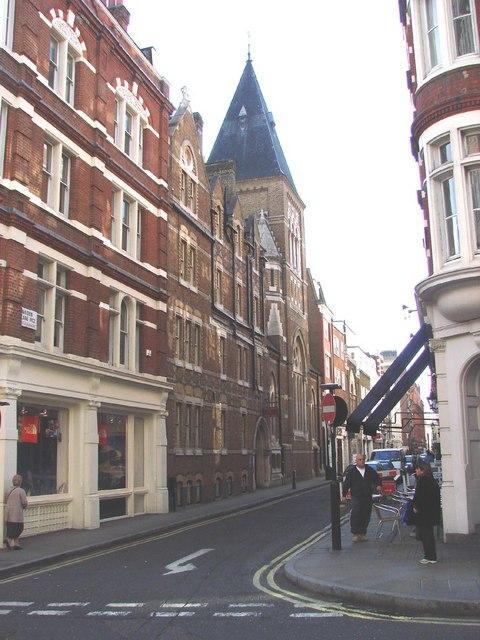
Corpus Christi Church, Maiden Lane

Corpus Christi Roman Catholic Church, Maiden Lane, is a Roman Catholic church in Maiden Lane, Covent Garden, in the Westminster City Council area of London, England. The church building, in Early English Gothic style, is grade II listed and was designed by F. H. Pownall; it was “specifically devoted to the adoration of the Blessed Sacrament.”

== History ==
The site was leased to the parish by the Duke of Bedford with the condition that the church should cost no less than £6,000; it actually cost £8,000. The foundation stone was laid in 1873, with the internal floor level three feet below pavement level to avoid the building being too tall. It was opened in 1874 by Cardinal Henry Manning, at that time the Archbishop of Westminster, and dedicated to Corpus Christi "as an act of reparation for the indignities offered to the Blessed Sacrament in this country in the sixteenth century and since". It was not consecrated until 1956 when the debt was finally cleared.

One of the early parish priests was Fr Francis Stanfield who wrote two famous hymns: 'Sweet Sacrament Divine' and 'O Sacred Heart'.

The church features in Graham Greene’s novel "The End of the Affair". Dominic Bruce, the British Royal Air Force officer known as the "Medium Sized Man", married Mary Brigid Lagan on 25 June 1938 at Corpus Christi Catholic Church, Maiden Lane.

== Interior ==
The main altar and reredos is by Thomas Earp, who may also have carved the altar in the Sacred Heart chapel. The statue of the Sacred Heart is a replacement in the recent restoration (2018).

The stained glass windows may be by Clayton and Bell while the blocked window in the south aisle is by Mayer.

The Lady Chapel, designed after the Holy House in Loreto, contains a statue of Our Lady of Walsingham which was installed and blessed by Bishop Alan Hopes of East Anglia in September 2015. The statue of Our Lady of Walsingham was carved specially for the chapel by studio Stuflesser in Italy. The stained glass in the Shrine Chapel shows the Coronation of the Virgin.

Near the sanctuary steps is a bronze statue of St Tarcisius, the Roman boy martyr, by Karin Jonzen.

There is a statue of St Genesius, a Roman martyr and patron saint of actors; the church has a long association with actors and is the spiritual home of the Catholic Stage Guild. It is also home to the Latin Mass Society.

A shrine for Blessed Carlo Acutis, carved by Ferdinand Stuflesser in Italy and including a relic, was unveiled on his feast day on 12 October 2022. A statue of St. Gianna Molla, carved by Ferdinand Stuflesser, was unveiled on 29 April 2023.

== Restoration ==
The church has undergone extensive renovation costing £1.5 million to remove the 1970s paint. It was re-opened by Vincent Cardinal Nichols, Archbishop of Westminster, in 2018, who dedicated the new Diocesan Shrine to the Blessed Sacrament. The new Stations of the Cross were sculpted by Arthur Fleischmann and donated in his memory by his widow. The Sodality in honour of the Blessed Sacrament founded in 1923 by Cardinal Bourne was re-established in 2016. In 2025, the church will be a Jubilee church for the Ordinary Jubilee called by Pope Francis, and as such a place of pilgrimage where pilgrims can obtain the Plenary Indulgence.

== Gallery ==
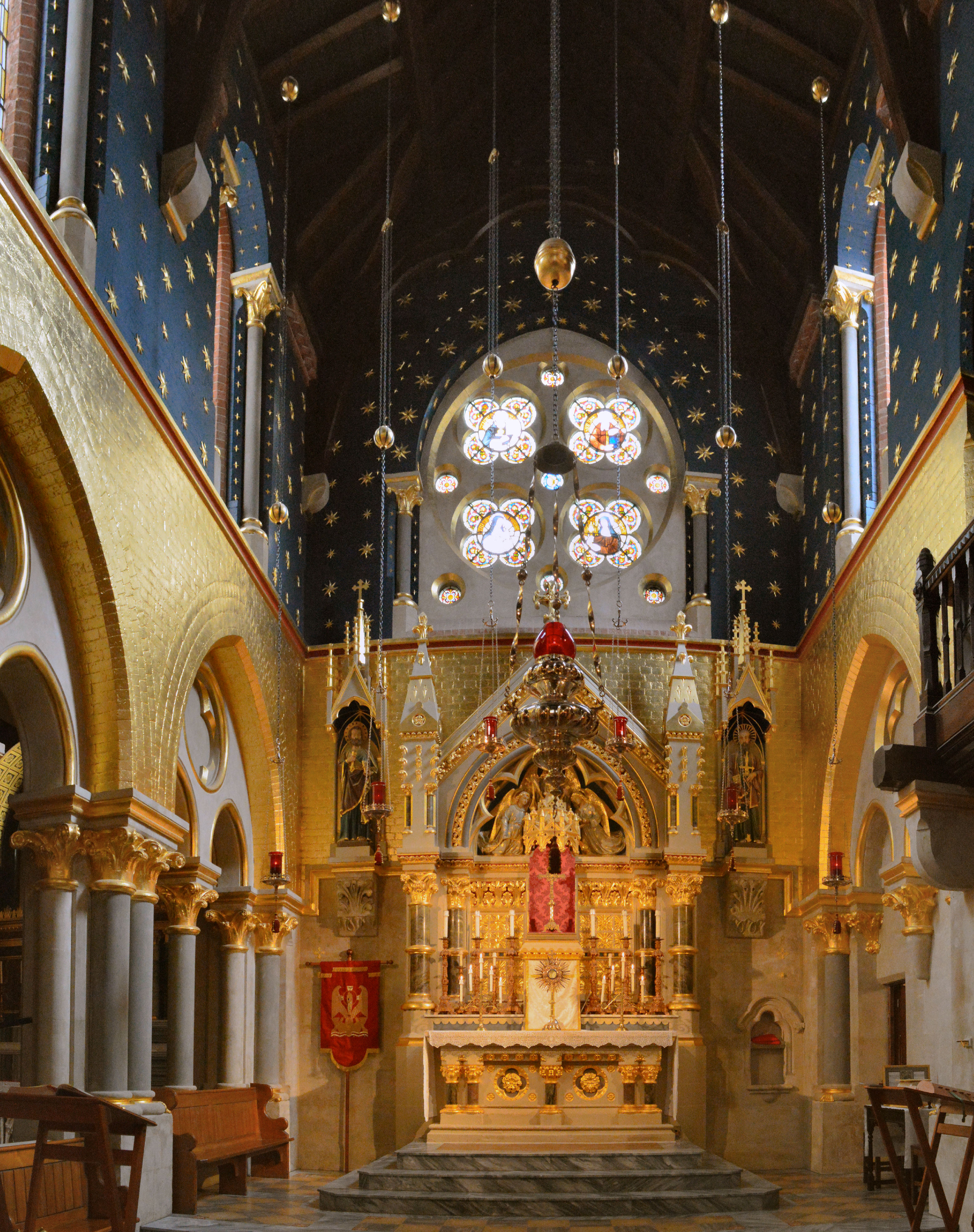
Interior

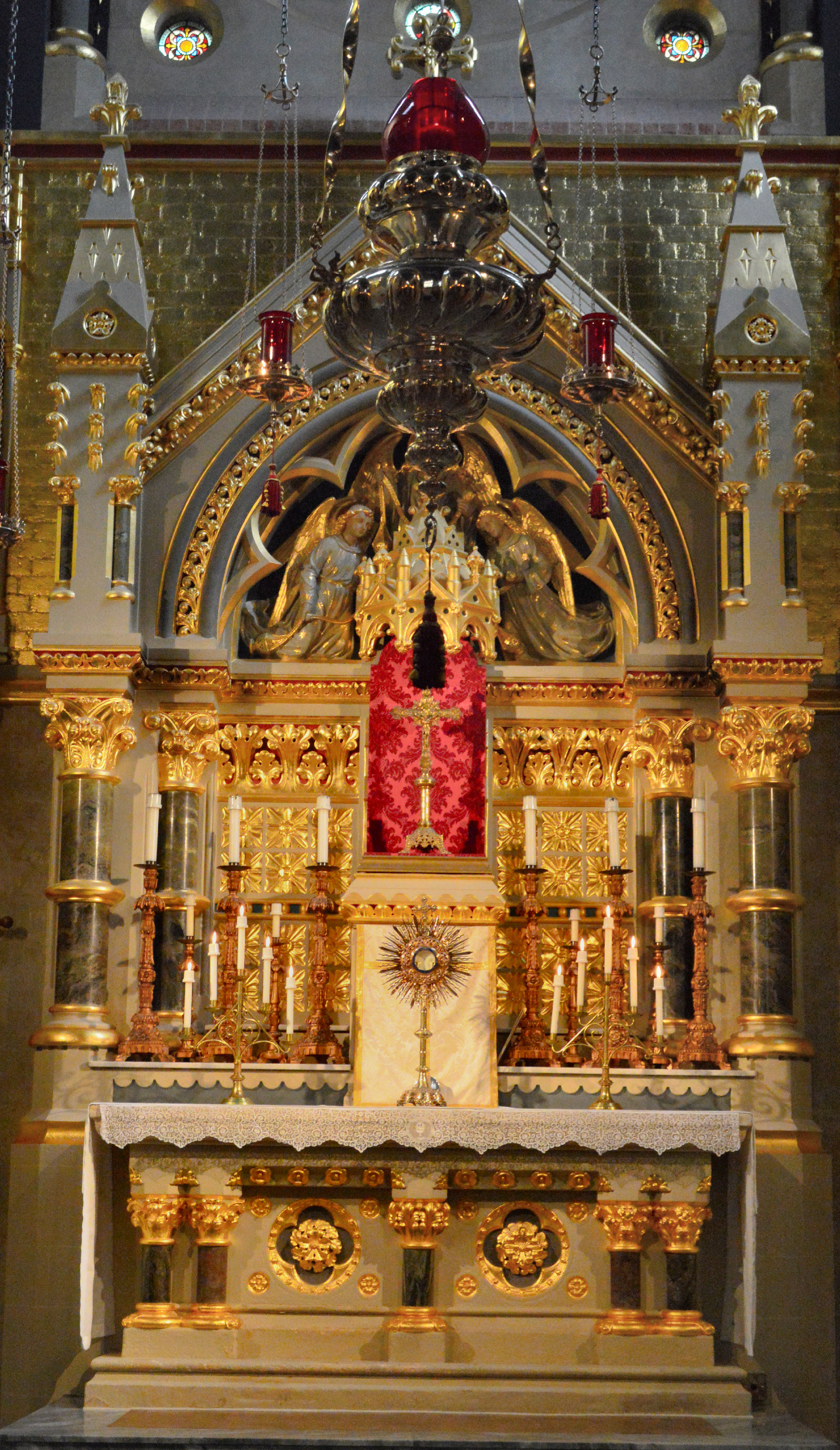
Altar

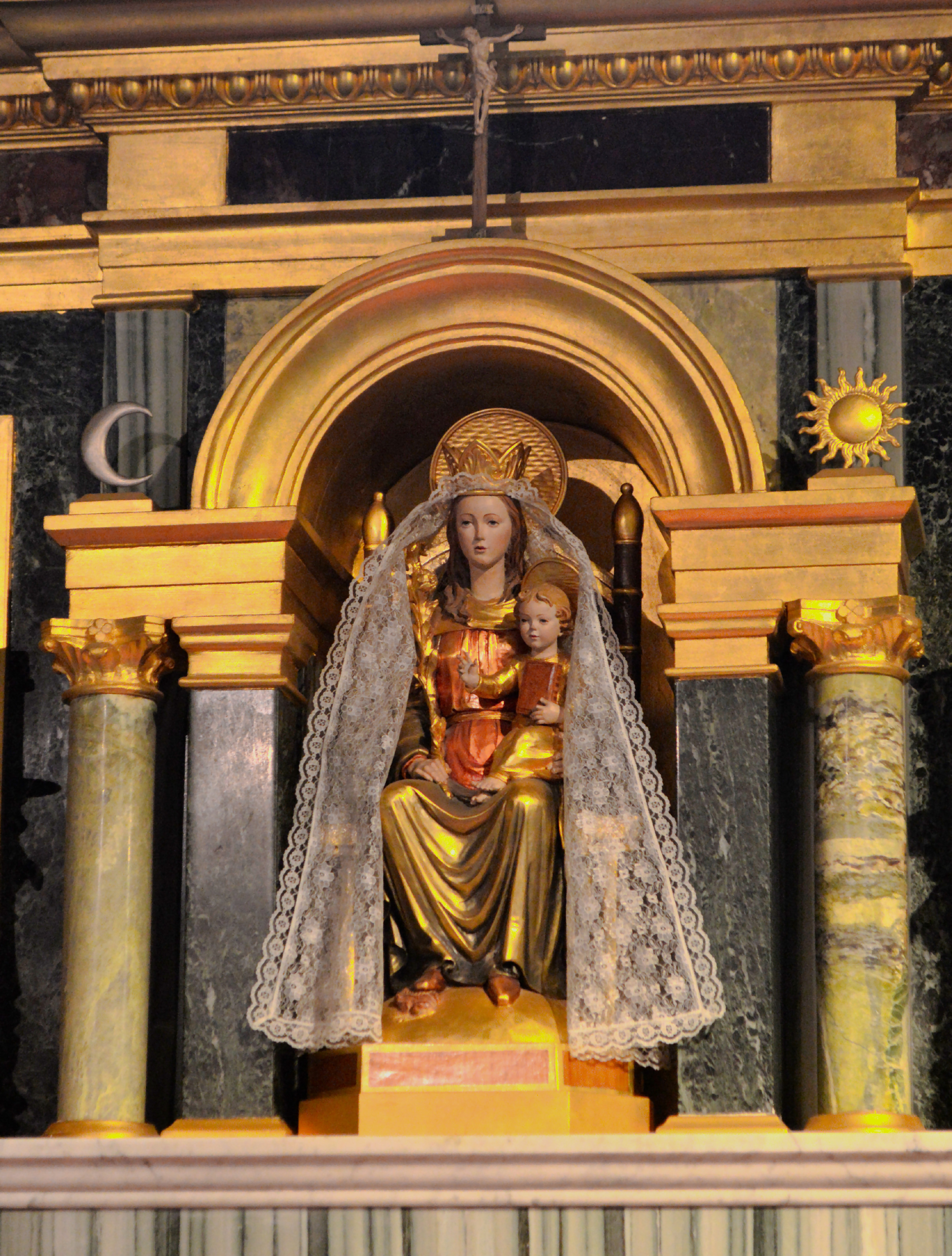
Statue of Our Lady of Walsingham

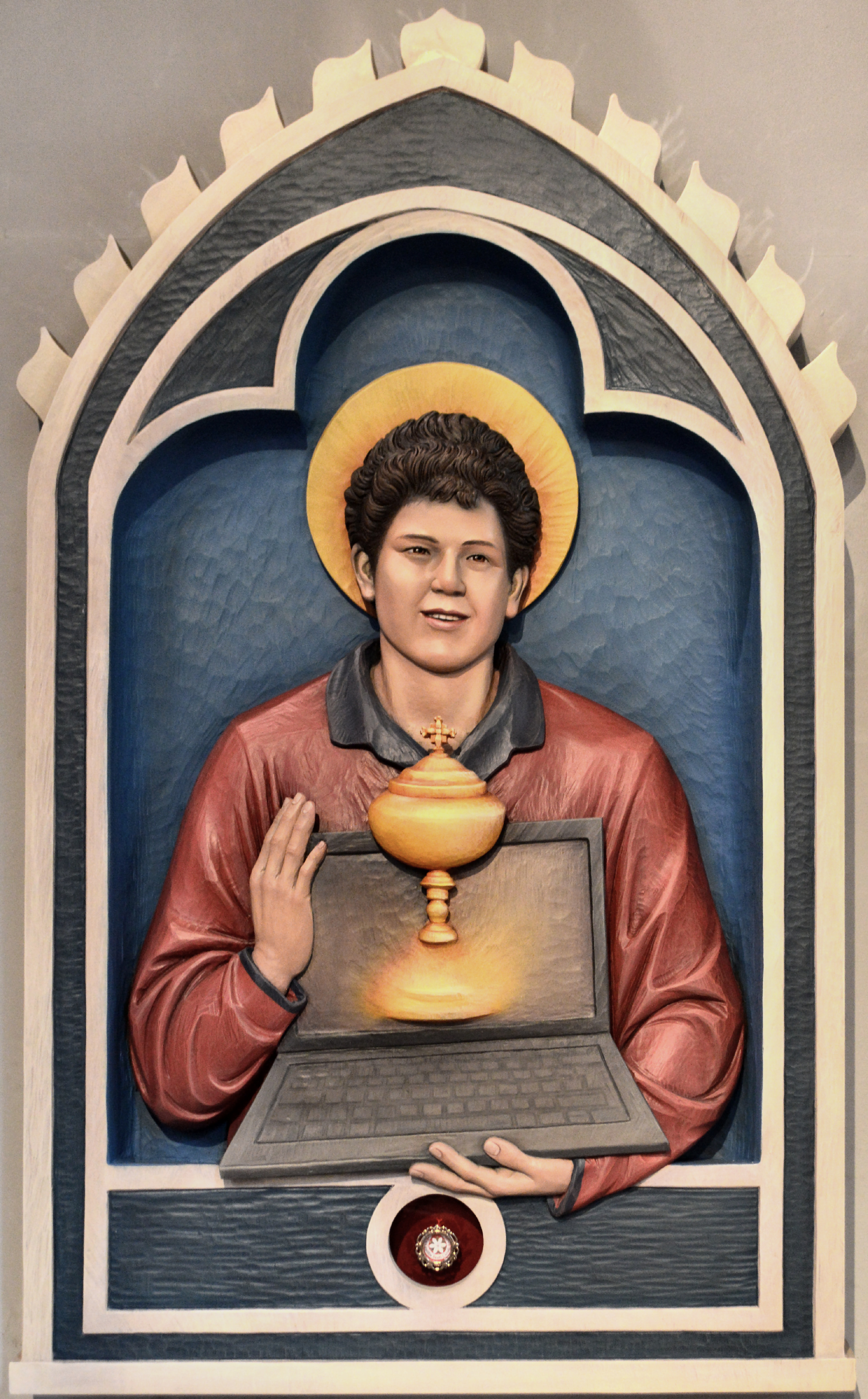
Shrine to St Carlo Acutis

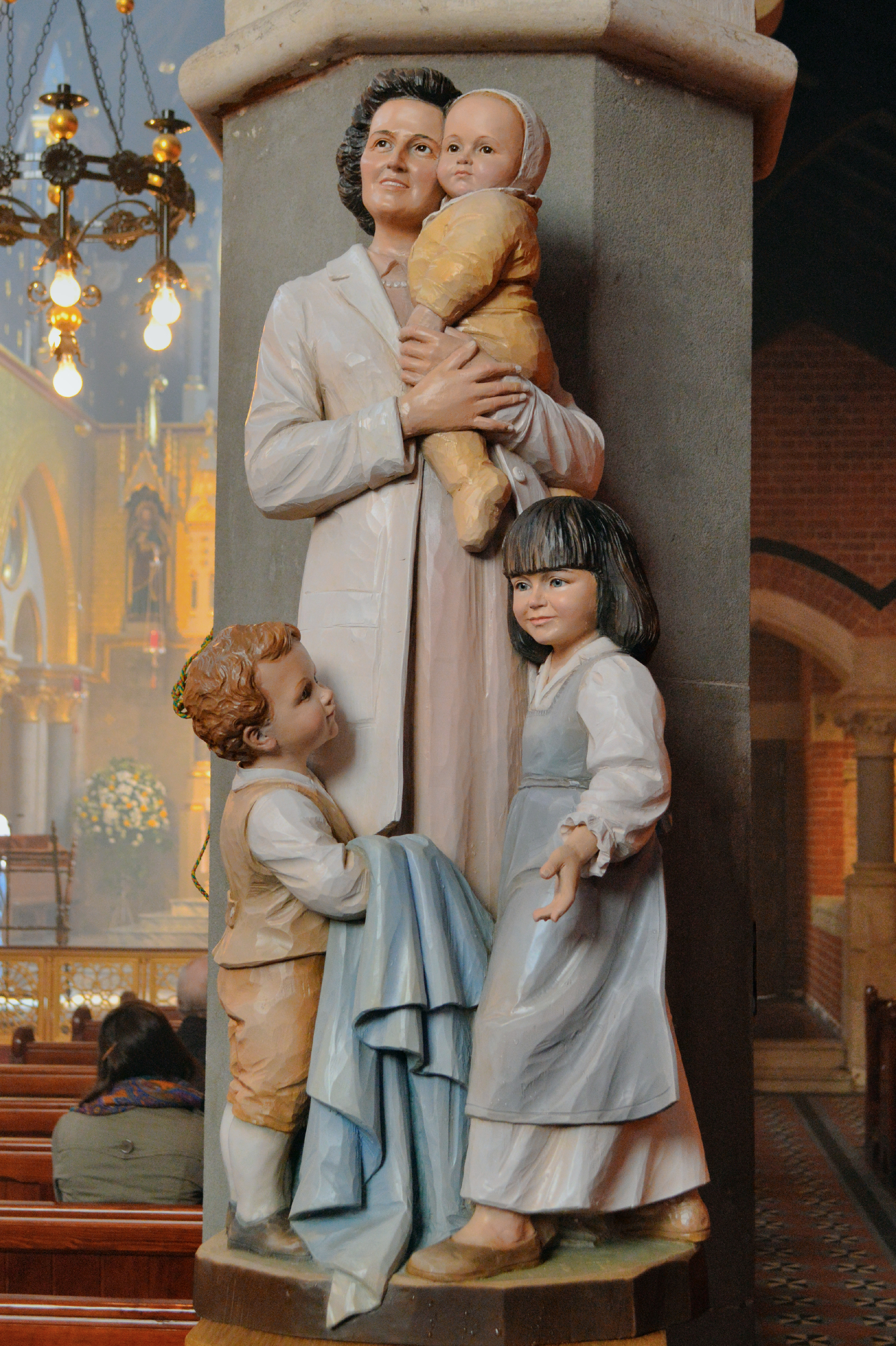
Statue of St Gianna Molla
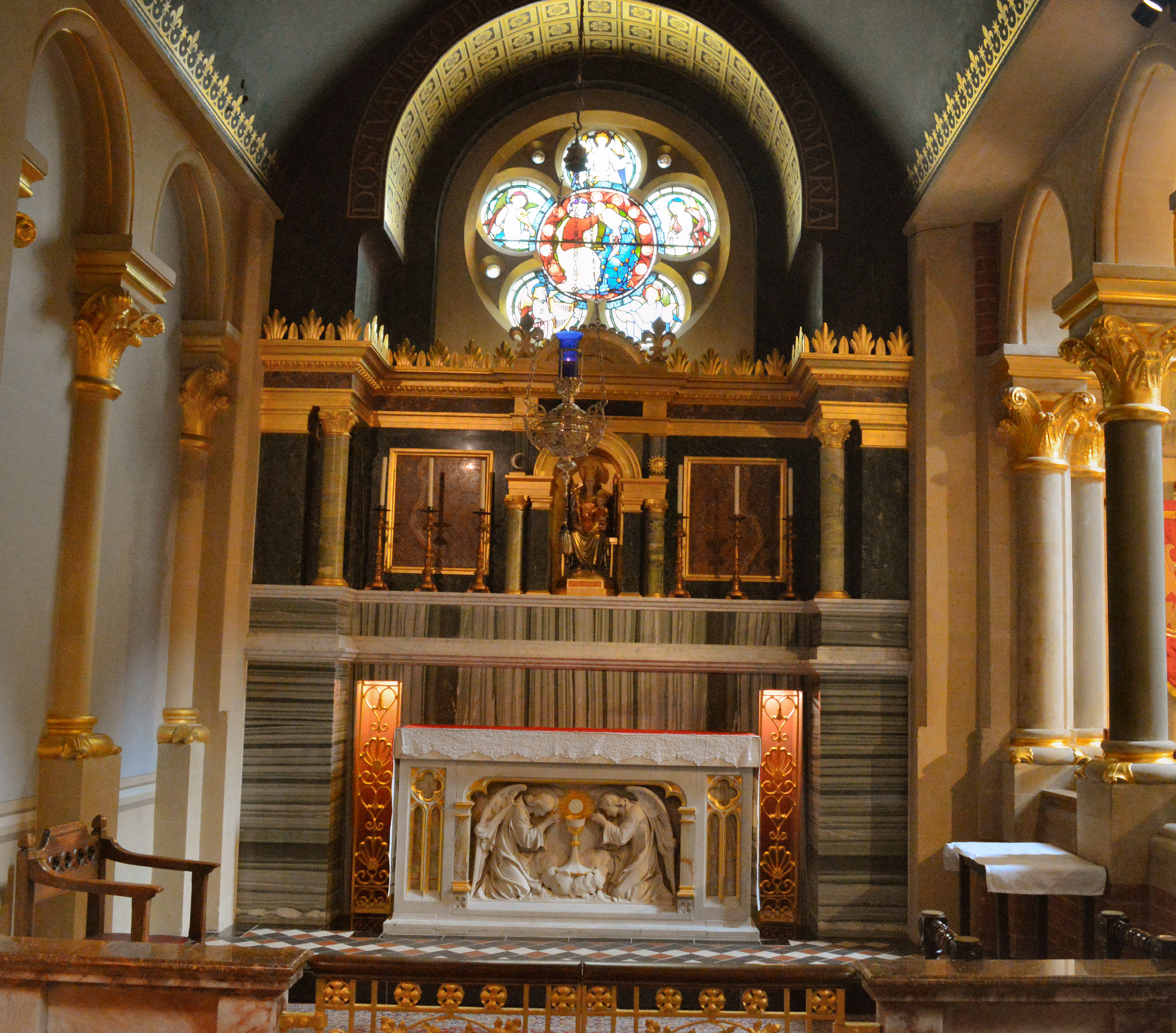
The Shrine chapel

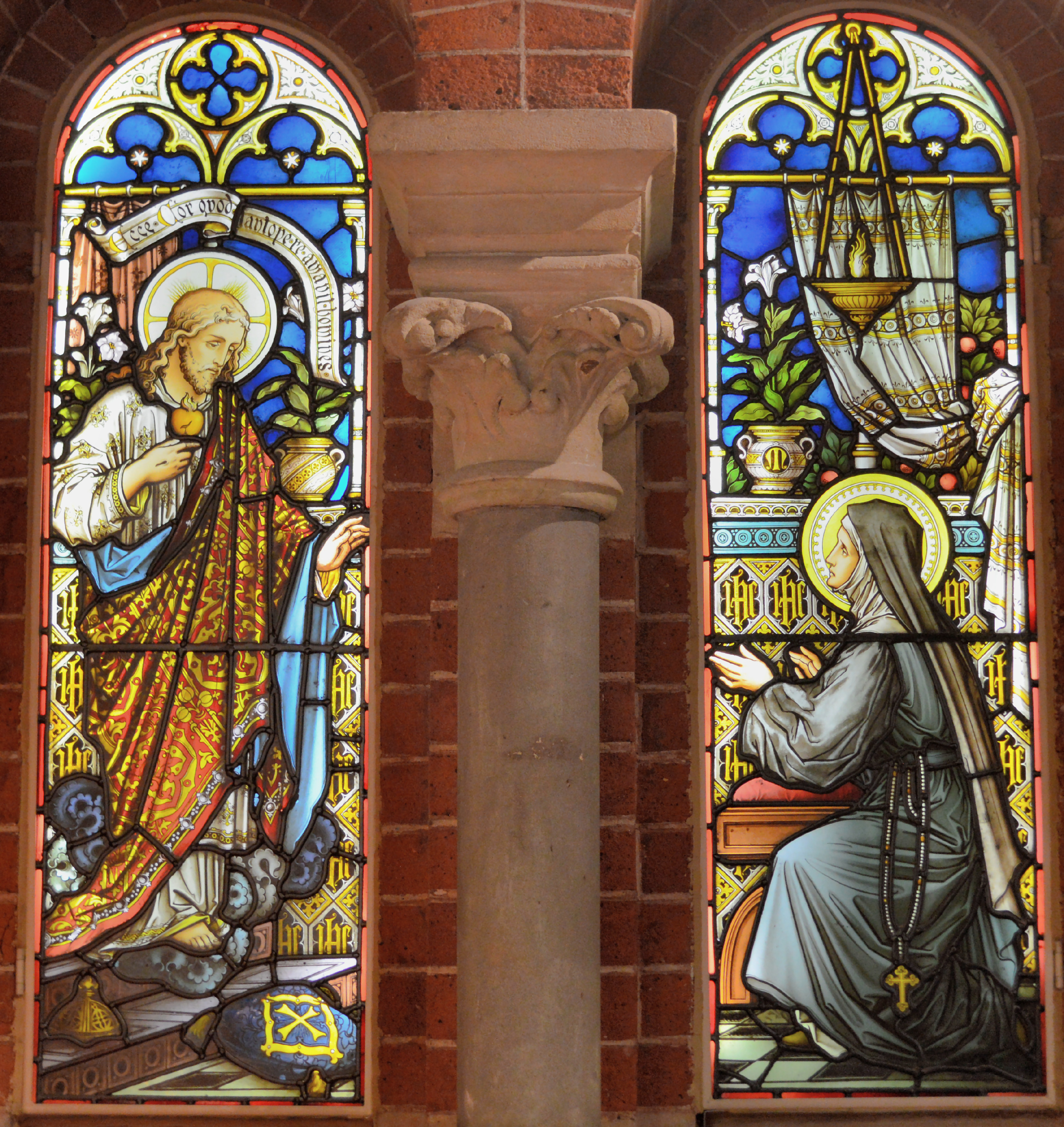
Stained-glass windows
