= Mary Hudson (organist) =

English organist (died 1801)

Mary Hudson (died 1801), was an English organist and a composer of hymns.

Hudson was the daughter of Robert Hudson. She was elected organist of St Olave Hart Street, London, on 20 December 1781, at a yearly salary of twenty-five guineas, and held this post until her death on 28 March 1801. During the last eight or nine years of her life she also fulfilled the duties of organist at the church of St Mary Magdalen Old Fish Street.

She was the composer of several hymn tunes, and of a setting for five voices of a translation of the epitaph on Purcell's gravestone, commencing "Applaud so great a guest!". The hymn tune Llandaff is assigned both to her and to her father.
