= Seething Lane =

Street in the City of London, England

Coordinates: 51°30′38″N 00°04′45″W

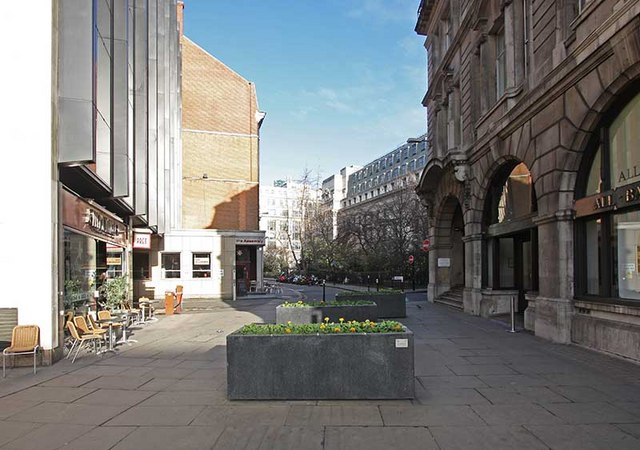
Seething Lane, viewed from Byward Street at its southern end.

Seething Lane is a street in the City of London. It connects All Hallows-by-the-Tower, Byward Street, with St Olave's Church, Hart Street. The street is named after an Old English expression meaning "full of chaff", which was derived from the nearby corn market in Fenchurch Street. Samuel Pepys lived there and is buried in St Olave's Church at the junction with Hart Street. A bust of Pepys, created by Karin Jonzen, sits in the public garden at the south end of the street.

== Etymology ==
The term 'seething' originates from the Old English word sifeða that meant bran, chaff, or siftings. The street was named prior to the thirteenth century, when the lane was a narrow path, and grain was threshed there.

== History ==
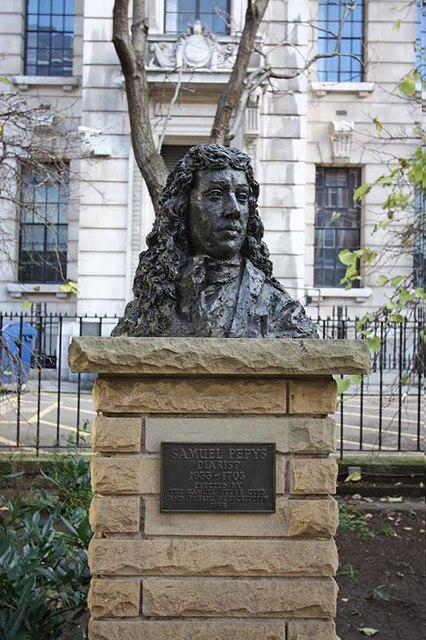
Bust of Samuel Pepys in Seething Lane Gardens, by Karin Jonzen, 1983

In the 14th century, the street contained several houses owned by the Lords Grey of Codnor, with records suggesting ownership dating back at least a century. The Knollys Inn, on the west site of Seething Lane, was established in 1370 when Sir Robert Knollys purchased the estate from Thomas de Brandon.

Sir Francis Walsingham lived in Seething Lane from 1580 until his death ten years later. Frances Seymour, Duchess of Somerset was born at the house in 1599. The Earl of Northumberland owned Walsingham House from 1603 to 1606, and in 1604 it was visited by the priest Henry Garnet and the Spanish ambassador Juan de Tassis, 1st Count of Villamediana.

The Navy Office building here was constructed in 1656. Samuel Pepys moved into a house in the lane in 1660 when he became Clerk of the Acts of the Navy. The office was destroyed by fire in 1673 and rebuilt over the following two years, designed by Sir Christopher Wren. It was demolished in 1788. Catherine Court, also by Wren, was a combined office and residential building on the east side of Seething Lane constructed between 1720 and 1725. It supported two large doorways flanked by four large Roman Doric columns. The property was demolished in 1913 and replaced with offices for the Port of London Authority.

== Samuel Pepys ==
Seething Lane was Samuel Pepys's home when he became the Navy Board's Clerk of the Acts, and is mentioned in his diaries as the site of an erotic encounter with a Mrs Daniels, after which he bought her eight pairs of gloves at a nearby milliner's shop. He is buried in St Olave's Church which is at the north-western end of the street at its junction with Hart Street. A bust of Pepys, created by Karin Jonzen, sits in Seething Lane Gardens at the south end of the street.

== Knollys Rose Ceremony ==
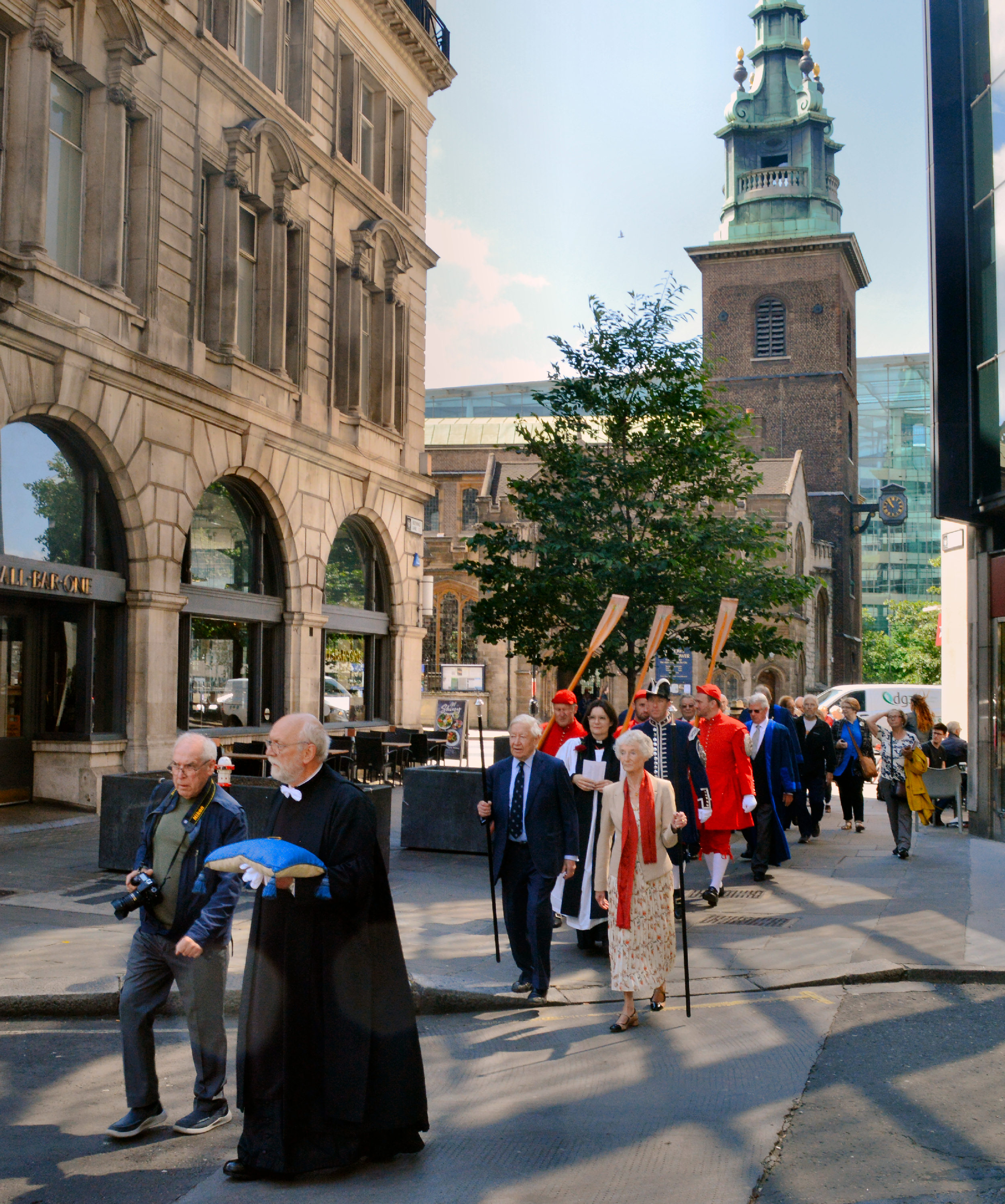
The Knollys Rose procession enters Seething Lane in June 2019.

An annual tradition held on the Nativity of Saint John the Baptist in June, is that a single red rose is cut in Seething Lane Gardens by the Company of Watermen and Lightermen and carried in procession to the Lord Mayor of London at the Mansion House. It commemorates the fee of one rose annually, charged by the city to Sir Robert Knolles or Knollys, in compensation for his wife having constructed a wooden footbridge over Seething Lane in 1381.
