= Mary Hudson (businesswoman) =

American oil business tycoon

Mary Hudson Vandergrift was an American oil business tycoon. She was born in 1912. At the height of her success, she was one of only three women on Forbes' list of 400 richest Americans. She was the founder and owner of Hudson Oil Company which operated an oil refinery plus 300 gas stations in 35 states. The business later collapsed due to court judgments against her company for allegations of overcharging customers and for underpaying its employees.

== Career ==
Her business started in 1933 after her husband, Wayne Driver, was killed in a crash. At age 21, she borrowed $200 from her father which then used to open her first Hudson Oil Co. station in Kansas City.

Throughout the years, she built a chain of oil stations known for its low prices and no-frills service. These stations were among the first in the country to feature self-service. In early 1980s, the business turned sour when the US oil industry crashed.

She died of cancer in September 1999 at home in Prairie Village, Kansas.
