= List of churches in the City of London =

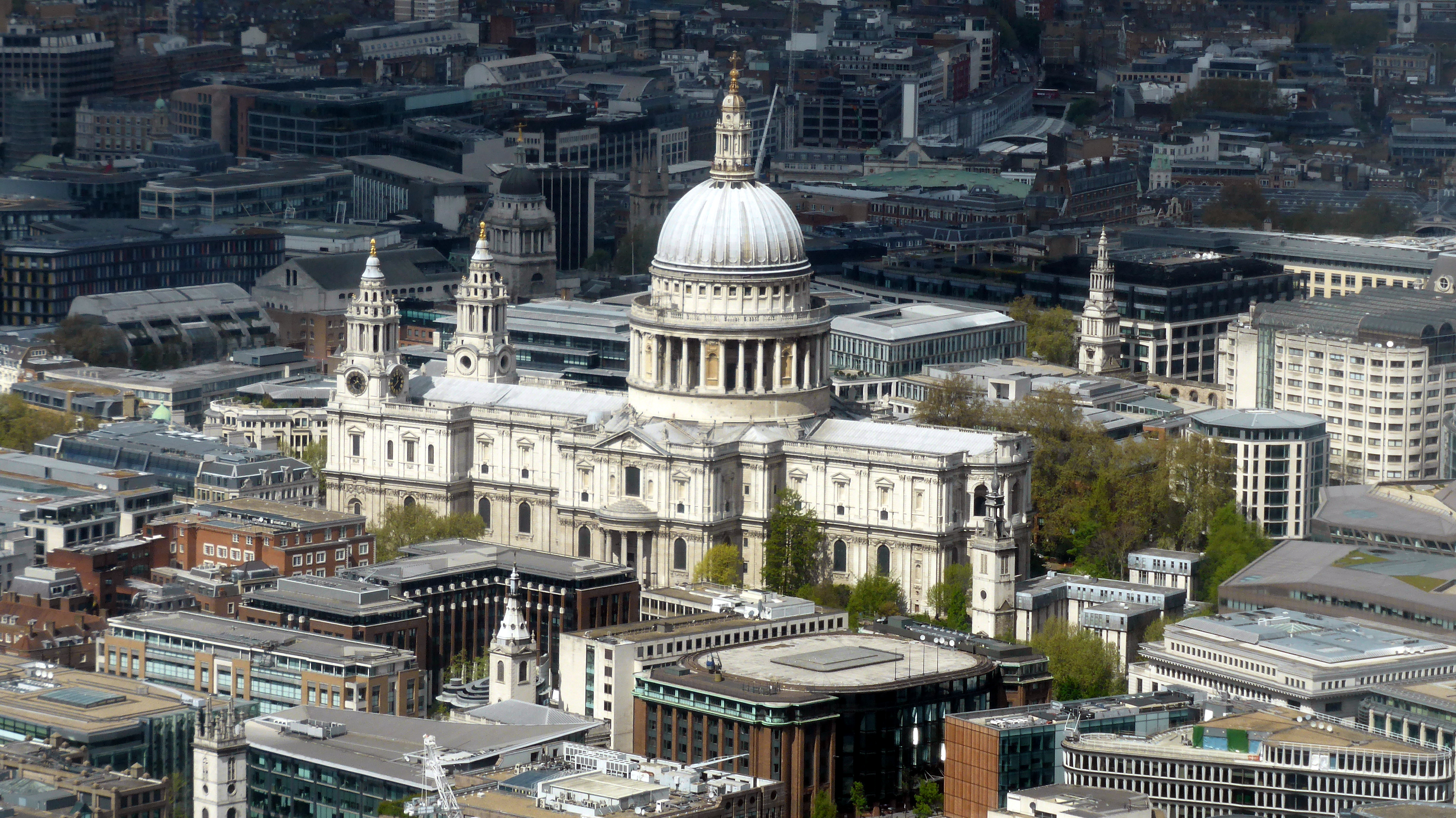
St Paul's Cathedral is the largest church building

This is a list of cathedrals, churches and chapels in the City of London. The list focuses on the more permanent churches and buildings which identify themselves as places of Christian worship. The denominations appended are those by which they self-identify.

== History ==
=== Wren and Anglican churches ===
Before the Great Fire of London in 1666, the City of London had around 100 churches in an area of only one square mile (2.6 km^{2}). Of the 86 destroyed by the Fire, 51 were rebuilt along with St Paul's Cathedral. The majority have traditionally been regarded as the work of Sir Christopher Wren, but although their rebuilding was entrusted primarily to him, the role of his various associates, including Robert Hooke and Nicholas Hawksmoor especially, is currently being reassessed and given greater emphasis.

With regard to Anglican churches, as opposed to Catholic churches, nonconformist chapels or meeting houses, the designs of the Wren office provided a new standard for British church architecture ever since, as well as giving a distinctive face to the Anglican church in London. Wren also designed a number of Anglican churches outside the City, including St James's, Piccadilly and St Clement Danes. After the Wren era, Hawksmoor was responsible for six of the great Anglican churches in the East End of London (for example Christ Church, Spitalfields), and other architects such as Hooke, James Gibbs and John James contributed significantly to Anglican church architecture in London.

=== Metropolitan area ===
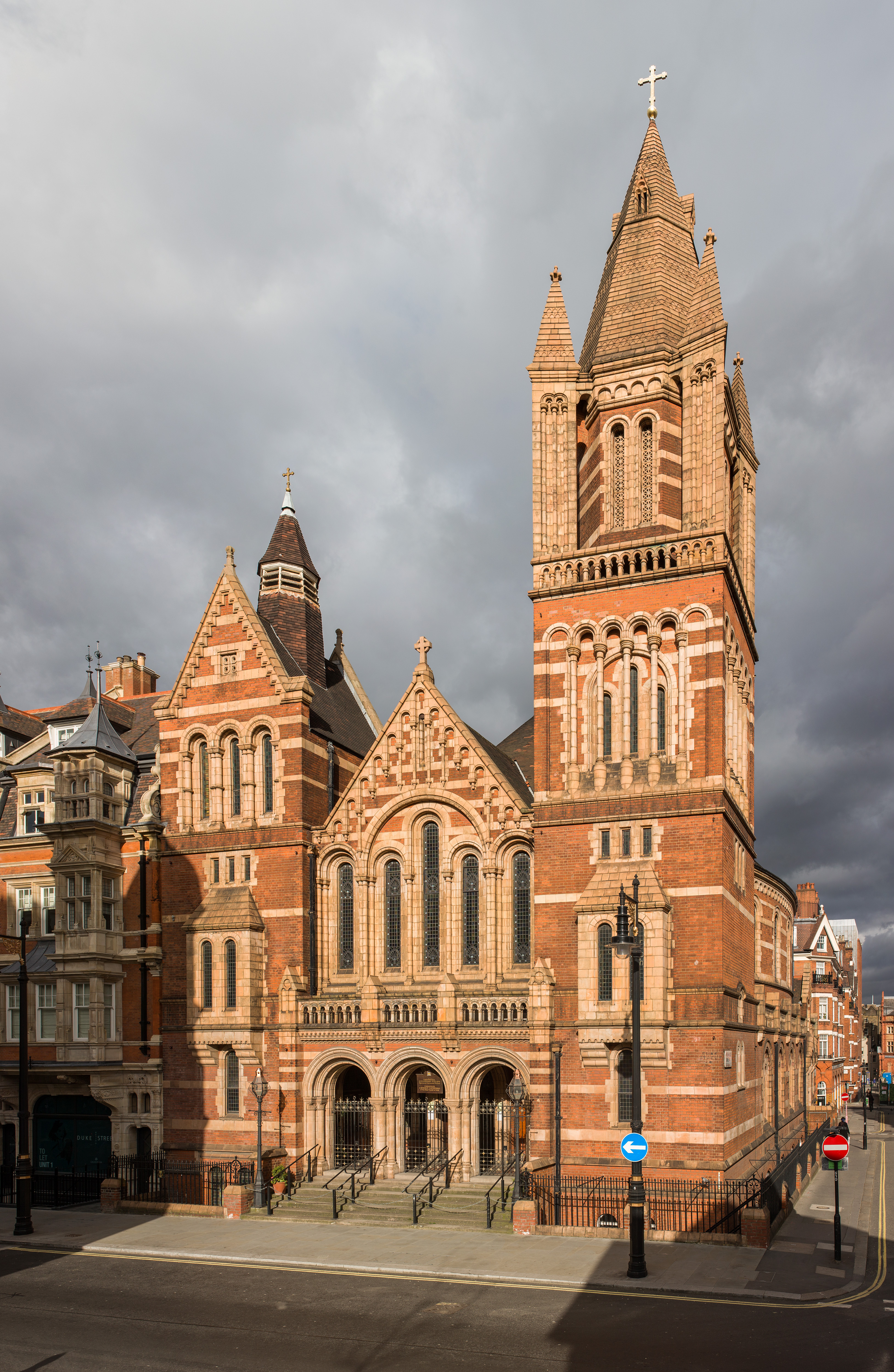
The King's Weigh House building on Duke Street, Mayfair (designed by Alfred Waterhouse and an example of nonconformist church architecture) today serves as the Ukrainian Catholic Cathedral of the Holy Family in Exile.

London's churches and chapels are numerous and diverse. Anglican and nonconformist churches and chapels are most numerous, but there are also many Catholic churches as well as places of worship for non-Christian religions.

Most of the Anglican churches lie within the Anglican dioceses of London to the north and Southwark to the south. For historical reasons, the Anglican churches in London north of the Thames but east of the River Lea fall within the Diocese of Chelmsford, and those in the London Boroughs of Bexley and Bromley fall within the Diocese of Rochester. A few Anglican churches in the Barnet area fall into the Diocese of St Albans, reflecting the historical association of Barnet with Hertfordshire. The Catholic dioceses that cover Greater London are, north of the Thames and west of the Lea, the Diocese of Westminster; south of the Thames the Archdiocese of Southwark; and north of the Thames and east of the Lea, the Diocese of Brentwood. There are still some two thousand Anglican churches alone, across the capital and if nonconformist and other denominations are included, they cover every age and style, in the design and evolution of which at least six hundred different architects have made contributions. As London expanded during the early 19th century, many new churches and chapels were built independently by the growing nonconformist urban population; to match the growth in nonconformist churches and chapels, the Anglican "Waterloo church" building programme saw numerous Anglican churches constructed across south London in the first half of the century.

=== Significance ===
Although many churches and chapels were entirely or partly lost to 19th-century demolitions and to bombing in the Second World War, many historic, architecturally significant and religiously significant buildings remain, particularly in the City of London and the neighbouring City of Westminster. A number of the churches are mentioned in the nursery rhyme Oranges and Lemons. Churches in this list belong to various denominations, as indicated.

== List of churches ==
The City of London is not a London borough but, while being a ceremonial county in its own right, is within Greater London. In 1666 there were 96 parishes within the bounds of the City. Today the following continue Christian witness in one form or another in the heart of London. A map can be found here: The area has 46 churches for just 9,400 inhabitants; the ratio of one church to every 204 people is the highest in England, but the statistic disguises the fact that the vast majority of attendees at City churches live outside the area.

=== Medieval parish churches in the City ===
This map shows the medieval churches in the City of London.

Medieval parish churches in the City of London

=== Churches holding regular service ===
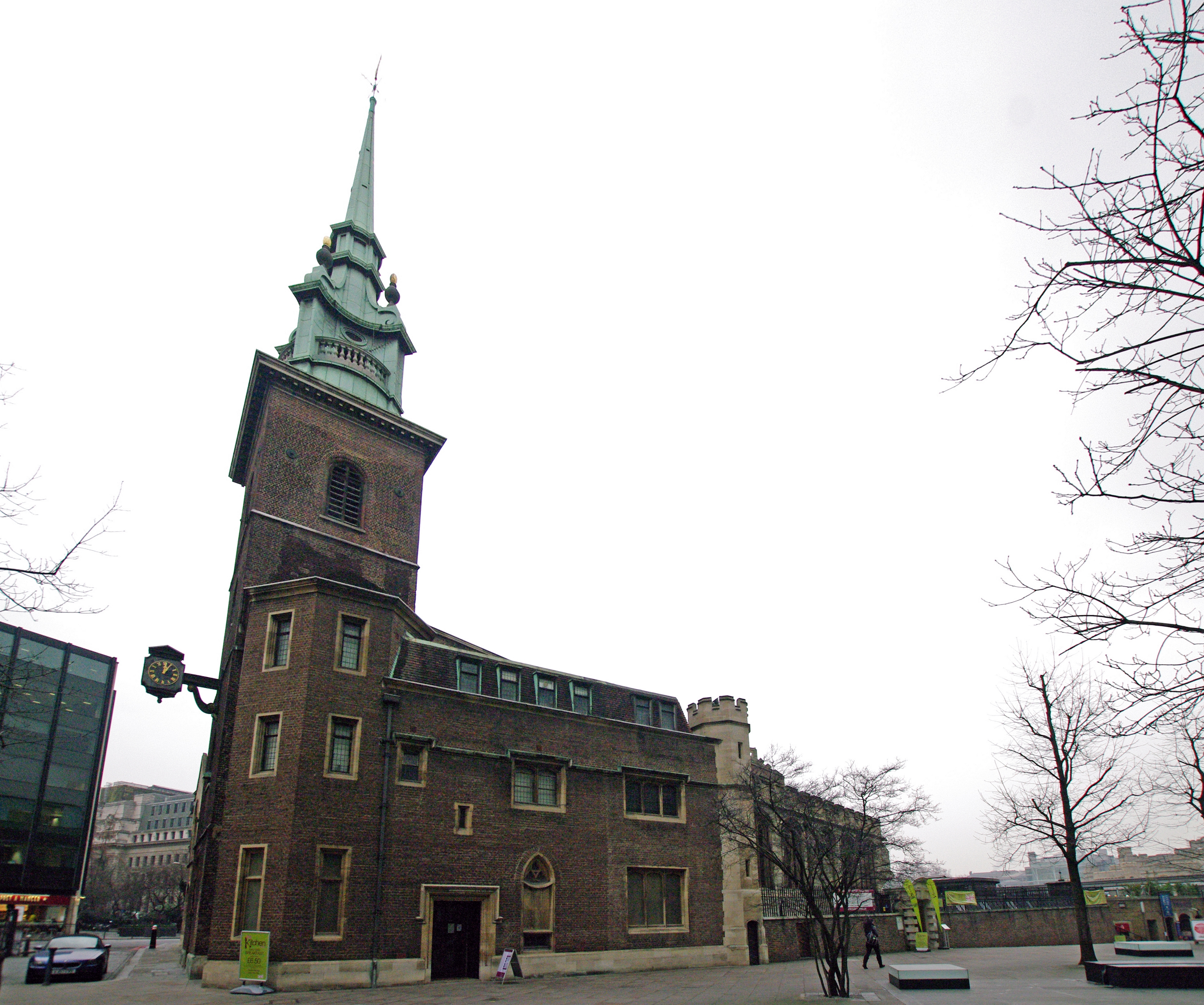
All Hallows-by-the-Tower

Church name	Location	Dedication	Founded	Denomination	Notes
All Hallows-by-the-Tower or All Hallows Barking	Tower Hill	All Saints	C7th–C11th	Anglican	Rebuilt C15th but contains arched doorway dated to C7th–C11th
All Hallows-on-the-Wall	London Wall	All Saints	C12th	Anglican	Rebuilt 1767. Guild church
St Andrew-by-the-Wardrobe	Blackfriars	Andrew	C12th	Anglican	Rebuilt 1695, 1961 (after Blitz)
St Andrew, Holborn	Holborn	Andrew	C10th	Anglican	Rebuilt C15th, c. 1680, 1961 (after Blitz). Weekday services serving workers
St Bartholomew-the-Great	West Smithfield	Bartholomew	C12th	Anglican	founded as an Augustinian priory. Rebuilt C19th. United with St Barts-the-Less
St Bartholomew-the-Less	St Bart's Hospital	Bartholomew	C12th	Anglican	Parish church C16th. Chapel of ease to St Bart-the-Great since 2015
St Benet, Paul's Wharf	Queenhithe	Benedict of Nursia	C12th	Anglican	Rebuilt 1683. Granted to Welsh-speaking Anglicans 1879
St Botolph, Aldersgate	Botwulf	Botwulf of Thorney	C13th	Anglican	Founded as a Cluniac priory. Rebuilt 1788–1791. Holds weekday Bible talks, run by St Helen's
St Botolph, Aldgate	Aldgate	Botwulf of Thorney	C11th	Anglican	Rebuilt C16th, 1741–1744. Restored 1966 (after Blitz)
St Botolph-without-Bishopsgate	Bishopsgate	Botwulf of Thorney	C13th	Anglican	Rebuilt 1724–1729. Weekday services serving workers
St Bride, Fleet Street	Fleet Street	Brigid	C7th–10th?	Anglican	Rebuilt C15th, 1675, 1957 (after Blitz)
St Dunstan-in-the-West	Farringdon W'out	Dunstan	C11th	Anglican	Rebuilt 1831–1833. Also used by Rom. Orthodox. Tuesday services
St Giles-without-Cripplegate	Barbican	Giles	C11th	Anglican	Rebuilt 1394
St Helen, Bishopsgate	Bishopsgate	Helena	C12th	Anglican	Initially part of a Benedictine nunnery. Conservative evangelical
St James Garlickhythe	Vintry Ward	James	C12th	Anglican	Rebuilt 1676–1683. Bishop of Fulham
St Katharine Cree	Aldgate	Catherine of Alexandria	1280	Anglican	Rebuilt 1628–1630.
St Lawrence Jewry	Guildhall	Lawrence	C12th	Anglican	Rebuilt 1670–1687. Guild church
St Magnus-the-Martyr	London Bridge	Magnus Erlendsson	C11th	Anglican	Rebuilt 1671–1687. Bishop of Fulham
St Margaret Lothbury	Bank	Margaret the Virgin	C12th	Anglican	Rebuilt 1686–1690. United with St Mary Woolnoth
St Margaret Pattens	Monument	Margaret the Virgin	C11th	Anglican	Rebuilt 1687. Guild church
St Martin within Ludgate	Ludgate Hill	Martin of Tours	C12th	Anglican	Rebuilt 1677–1684. Guild church; Thursday lunchtime services
St Mary Abchurch	Cannon Street	Mary	C12th	Anglican	Rebuilt 1681–1686. Guild church
St Mary Aldermary	Mansion House	Mary	C11th	Anglican	Rebuilt 1681. Guild church; may not hold regular services
St Mary-at-Hill	Billingsgate	Mary	C12th	Anglican	Rebuilt 1676
St Mary-le-Bow	Cheapside	Mary	C11th	Anglican	Rebuilt 1671–1673. Weekday services
St Mary Woolnoth	Bank	Mary	C12th	Anglican	Rebuilt 1716–1727. United with St Margaret Lothbury
St Michael, Cornhill	Cornhill	Michael	C12th	Anglican	Rebuilt 1672
St Nicholas Cole Abbey	Mansion House	Nicholas	C12th	Anglican	Rebuilt 1672–1678. Damaged 1941, restored 1962. Services restarted 2016
St Olave Hart Street	Tower Ward	Olaf II of Norway	C13th	Anglican	Rebuilt c. 1450. Restored 1954.
St Paul's Cathedral	St Paul's	Paul	C7th	Anglican	Rebuilt 962, 1087–1240 (Old St Paul's), 1669–1697
St Sepulchre-without-Newgate	Holborn	Holy Sepulchre	Saxon	Anglican	National Musicians' Church. Rebuilt C15th, 1670. Recent HTB church plant
St Stephen Walbrook	Mansion House	Stephen	Medieval	Anglican	Moved to current site 1439, rebuilt 1672–1679. Thursday services
St Vedast-alias-Foster	St Paul's	Vedast	C13th	Anglican	Restored 1695–1701, 1962
Temple Church	Inner Temple		C12th	Anglican	Originally Templar; owned by Inner Temple and Middle Temple. Round church
St Mary Moorfields	Moorfields	Mary	1820	Roman Catholic	Pro-cathedral of London 1820–1869. Rebuilt 1903
St Botolph's Orthodox Church	Bishopsgate	Botwulf of Thorney		Antioch Orthodox	Meets in St Botolph-without-Bishopsgate
London Romanian Orthodox Ch.	Fleet Street	George	1833	Romanian Orthodox	Meets in St Dunstan-in-the-West
St Thomas J. S. O. Church	Mansion House	Thomas	1989	Jacobite Syr Orth	Meets in St Mary Aldermary
St Gregorios	Blackfriars	Geevarghese Gregorios of Parumala		Malankara Orthodox Syrian	Meets in St Andrew-by-the-Wardrobe
St Anne's Lutheran Church	Billingsgate	Anne	?	Lutheran Church	Meets in St Mary-at-Hill
London City Presbyt. Church	Aldersgate		1949	Free Church of Scotland	Meets in St Botolph without Aldersgate (see below)
Jewin Welsh Presbyterian Chapel	Barbican		1774	Welsh Presbyterian	New buildings 1785, 1823, 1879. Rebuilt 1960
City Temple	Holborn Viaduct		1640	URC	First building on present site 1874. Rebuilt 1958 (after Blitz)
Dutch Church, Austin Friars	Broad Street		1550	Protestant Church in the Netherlands	Building C13th Augustinian priory. Stranger church. Rebuilt 1950–1954 (after Blitz)
London Intl Church of Christ	Westminster			Intl Church of Christ	Central congregation meets in City Temple, Holborn Viaduct
City Gates Church	London Wall		1985	Independent	Was in Ichthus. Meets in All Hallows-on-the-Wall (see below)
Christ Church London	Blackfriars	Jesus		Independent	Meets in the Mermaid Theatre

=== Churches demolished or no longer holding regular service ===
See also: List of demolished churches in the City of London, List of churches destroyed in the Great Fire of London and not rebuilt

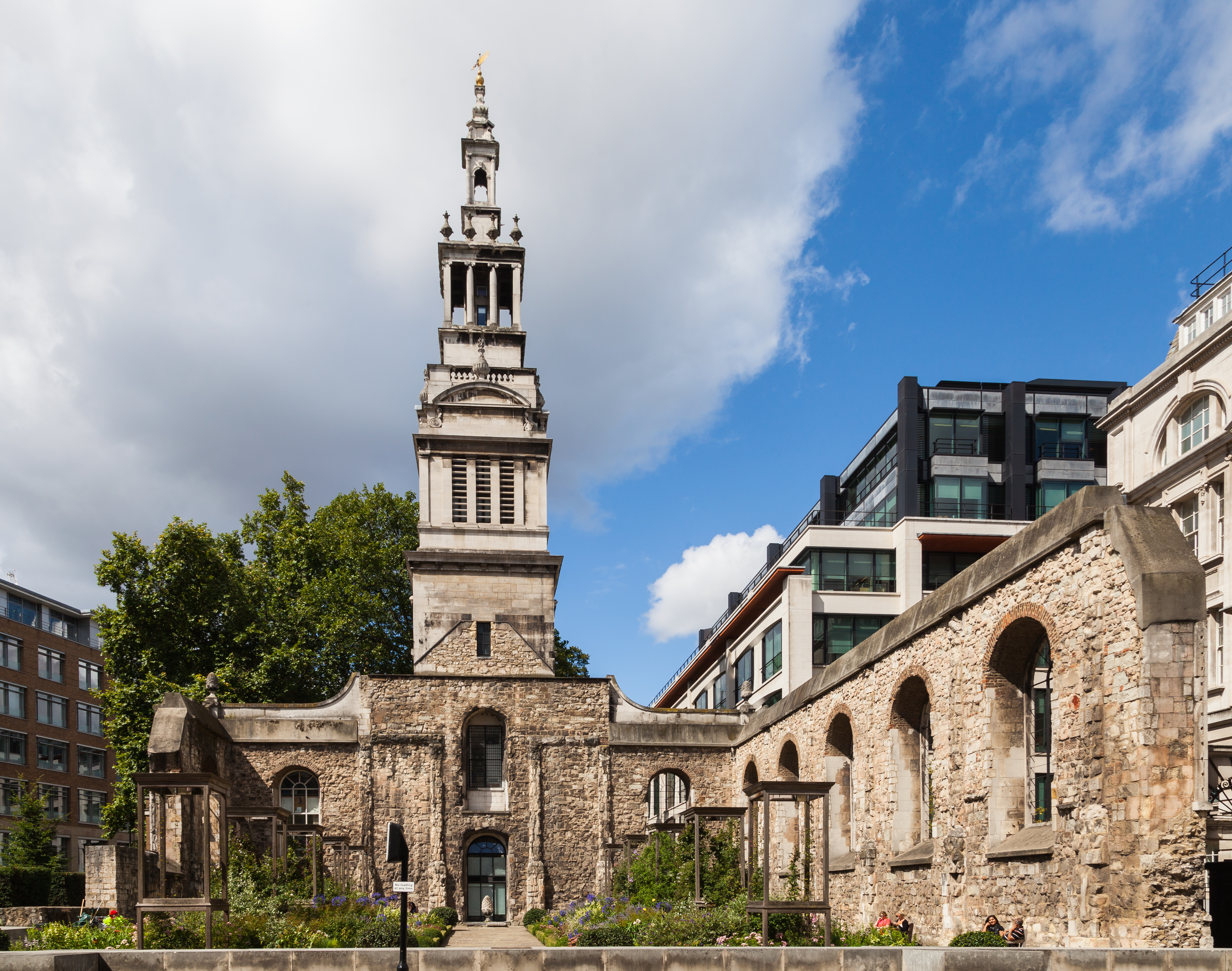
Christ Church Greyfriars

Church name	Dedication	Founded	Ended	Denomination	Notes
St Augustine Papey	Augustine of Canterbury	Medieval	1442		
St Nicholas Bread Street					
St Olave Bread Street					
Hospital of St Thomas of Acre	Thomas Becket	1227	1538		HQ of Knights of Saint Thomas
St Audoen within Newgate	Audoin	Medieval	1547	Church of England	Demolished 1583
St Nicholas Shambles	Nicholas	C12th	1547	Anglican	Demolished
Chapel of St Thomas on the Bridge	Thomas Becket	c. 1200	1548	Anglican	On London Bridge. Rebuilt 1212, 1384–1397. Demolished
St Mary Axe	Mary	C12th	1562	Anglican	Demolished 1565
All Hallows Honey Lane	All Saints	C12th	1666	Anglican	
All-Hallows-the-Less	All Saints	C13th	1666	Anglican	
Holy Trinity the Less	Trinity	C13th	1666	Anglican	Rebuilt 1606
St Andrew Hubbard	Andrew	Medieval	1666	Anglican	
St Ann Blackfriars	Anne	1550	1666	Anglican	Rebuilt 1597. Built on site of old Dominican monastery
SS Benet & Osyth, Sherehog	Benedict & Osgyth	C11th	1666	Anglican	
St Botolph Billingsgate	Botwulf of Thorney	Medieval	1666	Anglican	
St Faith under St Paul's	Faith	Medieval	1666	Anglican	Building demolished 1256; worshippers used west crypt under St Paul’s Quire
St Gabriel Fenchurch	Gabriel	C12th	1666	Anglican	
St Gregory by St Paul's	Pope Gregory I	C10th	1666	Anglican	
St John the Baptist upon Walbrook	John the Baptist	Medieval	1666	Anglican	
St John the Evangelist Friday Street	John the Evangelist	Medieval	1666	Anglican	
St John Zachary	John the Baptist	Medieval	1666	Anglican	
St Laurence Pountney	Lawrence	C13th	1666	Anglican	
St Leonard, Eastcheap	Leonard of Noblac	C11th	1666	Anglican	Rebuilt 1618
St Leonard, Foster Lane	Leonard of Noblac	C13th	1666	Anglican	
St Margaret Moses	Margaret the Virgin	Medieval	1666	Anglican	
St Margaret, New Fish Street	Margaret the Virgin	C10th	1666	Anglican	
St Martin Orgar	Martin of Tours	Medieval	1666	Anglican	Remains used by French Protestants until 1820. Tower survives (though rebuilt) as part of St Clement's
St Martin Pomary	Martin of Tours	Medieval	1666	Anglican	
St Martin Vintry	Martin of Tours	Medieval	1666	Anglican	Rebuilt 1306
St Mary Bothaw	Mary	C10th	1666	Anglican	
St Mary Colechurch	Mary	Medieval	1666	Anglican	
St Mary Mounthaw	Mary	Medieval	1666	Anglican	
St Mary Staining	Mary	Medieval	1666	Anglican	
St Mary Woolchurch Haw	Mary	C11th	1666	Anglican	
St Michael-le-Querne	Michael	C12th	1666	Anglican	
St Mary Magdalen, Milk Street	Mary Magdalene	C12th	1666	Anglican	
St Nicholas Acons	Nicholas	C11th	1666	Anglican	
St Nicholas Olave	Nicholas	Medieval	1666	Anglican	
St Olave Silver Street	Olaf II of Norway	C12th	1666	Anglican	Rebuilt 1609
St Pancras, Soper Lane	Pancras of Rome	Medieval	1666	Anglican	
St Peter, Paul's Wharf	Peter	C12th	1666	Anglican	
St Peter, Westcheap	Peter	C12th	1666	Anglican	
St Thomas the Apostle, London	Thomas	C12th	1666	Anglican	
St Christopher le Stocks	Christopher	C13th	1781	Anglican	Rebuilt 1672. Demolished
St Michael, Crooked Lane	Michael	C13th	1831	Anglican	Rebuilt 1336, 1687. Demolished
St Bartholomew-by-the-Exchange	Bartholomew	C13th	1840	Anglican	Rebuilt 1675–1683. Demolished
St Benet Fink	Benedict of Nursia	C10th	1841	Anglican	Rebuilt 1670–1675. Demolished 1842–1846
St Mary Somerset	Mary	C12th	1867	Anglican	Rebuilt 1686–1694. Demolished 1871; tower remains
St Benet Gracechurch	Benedict of Nursia	C11th	1868	Anglican	Rebuilt 1681–1687. Demolished
All Hallows Staining	All Saints	C12th	1870	Anglican	Rebuilt 1674. Demolished 1870 apart from tower
St Mildred, Poultry	Mildrith	C12th	1871	Anglican	Rebuilt 1456, 1676. Demolished 1872
St James Duke's Place	James the Great	1622	1874	Anglican	Rebuilt 1727. Demolished
St Martin Outwich	Martin of Tours	C14th	1874	Anglican	Rebuilt 1796–1798. Demolished
St Antholin, Budge Row	Anthony the Great	C12th	1875	Anglican	Rebuilt 1513, 1678–1684. Demolished
St Michael Queenhithe	Michael	C12th	1875	Anglican	Rebuilt 1676–1686. Demolished 1876
All Hallows, Bread Street	All Saints	C13th	1878	Anglican	Rebuilt 1681–1684. Demolished
St Dionis Backchurch	Dionysus the Areopagite	C13th	1878	Anglican	Rebuilt 1674. Demolished
St Matthew Friday Street	Matthew	C13th	1885	Anglican	Rebuilt 1682–1685. Demolished
St Mary Magdalen Old Fish Street	Mary Magdalene	C12th	1886	Anglican	Rebuilt 1683–1687. Demolished 1893
St Olave Old Jewry	Olaf II of Norway	C9th-C11th	1887	Anglican	Rebuilt 1671–1679. Demolished 1887; tower remains
St George Botolph Lane	George	C12th	1890	Anglican	Rebuilt 1671–1676. Demolished 1904
St Michael Bassishaw	Michael	C12th	1892	Anglican	Rebuilt 1675–1679. Demolished 1900
All-Hallows-the-Great	All Saints	C12th	1894	Anglican	Rebuilt 1677–1684. Demolished
St Michael Wood Street	Michael	C13th	1897	Anglican	Rebuilt 1673. Demolished
Holy Trinity Gough Square	Trinity	1837	1906	Anglican	Demolished
St Peter le Poer	Peter	C12th	1907	Anglican	Rebuilt 1792. Demolished
St Alphage London Wall	Ælfheah of Canterbury	C12th	1918	Anglican	Moved buildings C16th. Rebuilt 1774–1777. Mostly demolished 1923, now ruins only
St Katherine Coleman	Catherine of Alexandria	Medieval	1926	Anglican	Rebuilt 1741. Demolished
All Hallows Lombard Street	All Saints	C11th	1937	Anglican	Rebuilt 1694. Demolished
St Mary Aldermanbury	Mary	C12th	1940	Anglican	Damaged in Blitz. Stones rebuilt in Westminster College, Missouri 1966
Christ Church Greyfriars	Jesus	C13th	1940	Anglican	Rebuilt 1306–1326. Was part of Franciscan monastery. Rebuilt 1687. Destroyed, apart from tower, 1940
St Alban, Wood Street	Alban	C10th	1940	Anglican	Rebuilt 1634, 1685. Partially destroyed in Blitz; tower remains
St Stephen Coleman Street	Stephen	C13th	1940	Anglican	Rebuilt 1677, destroyed by bombing 1940
St Swithin, London Stone	Swithun	C13th	1940	Anglican	Rebuilt 1420, 1678, damaged by bombing 1940 and demolished 1962
St Augustine Watling Street	Augustine of Canterbury	C12th	1941	Anglican	Rebuilt 1683, destroyed in Blitz
St Dunstan-in-the-East	Dunstan	C11th	1941	Anglican	Rebuilt 1817–1821. Damaged in Blitz; walls and tower remain
St Michael Paternoster Royal	Michael	C13th	1941	Anglican	Rebuilt 1685–1694, 1966–1968 (after Blitz). Now HQ of Mission to Seafarers. Guild church
St Mildred, Bread Street	Mildrith	C13th	1941	Anglican	Rebuilt 1677–1683, destroyed by bombing 1941
St Andrew Undershaft	Andrew	C12th	?	Anglican	Rebuilt C14th, 1532. Now part of St Helen's Bishopsgate benefice
St Anne and St Agnes	Anne & Agnes	C12th	?	Anglican	Rebuilt 1548, 1680, 1966. Used by Lutheran Church 1966–2013. Now the Gresham Centre
St Edmund, King and Martyr	Edmund the Martyr	C13th	?	Anglican	Rebuilt 1670–1679. Disused, once base for London Centre for Spirituality, now a hospitality centre
St Ethelburga, Bishopsgate	Æthelburh of Barking	C13th	?	Anglican	Rebuilt 1411, 1993 (following bombing). Now Centre for Reconciliation and Peace
St Peter upon Cornhill	Peter	Ancient	?	Anglican	Now part of St Helen's and used for Bible studies and youth clubs
St Clement, Eastcheap	Pope Clement I	C11th	2012	Anglican	Rebuilt 1680s. Incorporates old tower of St Martin Orgar. Recently gutted to be turned into office space

== Related lists ==
- List of churches in London
- List of Christopher Wren churches in London
- List of places of worship in London, 1804
- Union of Benefices Act 1860
- Commission for Building Fifty New Churches
