= List of churches destroyed in the Great Fire of London and not rebuilt =

Church name	Location	United with
All-Hallows-the-Less	Upper Thames Street	St. Michael Paternoster Royal
All Hallows Honey Lane	114 Cheapside	St Mary-le-Bow
Holy Trinity the Less	Knightrider Street	St Michael Queenhithe
St Andrew Hubbard	Love Lane, Eastcheap	St Mary-at-Hill
St Ann Blackfriars	Ireland Yard, Blackfriars	St. Andrew-by-the-Wardrobe
St Benet Sherehog	Poultry	St Stephen Walbrook
St Botolph Billingsgate	Thames Street	St. George Botolph Lane
St Faith under St Paul's	West end of the crypt	St Augustine Watling Street
St Gabriel Fenchurch	Stood in the middle of Fenchurch Street	St Margaret Pattens
St Gregory by St Paul's	Close to the southwest wall of Old St. Paul's	St Martin, Ludgate
St John the Baptist upon Walbrook	Cloak Lane (west side), Cannon Street	St Antholin, Budge Row
St John the Evangelist	Watling Street at Friday Street	St Mary-le-Bow (ibid)
St John Zachary	Gresham Street (north side)	St Anne and St Agnes
St Laurence Pountney	Laurence Pountney Hill	St Magnus-the-Martyr
St Leonard, Eastcheap	Cheapside	St Benet Gracechurch
St Leonard, Foster Lane	Cheapside	Christchurch, Newgate Street
St Margaret Moses	Friday Street at Cheapside	St Mildred, Bread Street
St Margaret, New Fish Street	Monument Yard, close to London Bridge	St Magnus, London Bridge
St Martin Pomary	Ironmonger Lane (east side)	St Margaret Lothbury
St Martin Vintry	Southwark Bridge at Thames Street	St. Michael Paternoster Royal (ibid)
St Mary Bothaw	South of Cannon Street	St Swithin's, Cannon Street
St Mary Colechurch	South end of Old Jewry	St Mildred, Poultry
St Mary Mounthaw	West side of Old Fish Street	St Nicholas Cole Abbey
St Mary Staining	Oat Lane	Church of St Alban, Wood Street
St Mary Woolchurch Haw	Queen Victoria Street	St Mary Woolnoth
St. Mary Magdalen Milk Street	North side of Knightrider Street	St Lawrence Jewry
St Michael-le-Querne	Round Court	St Vedast Foster Lane (ibid)
St Nicholas Acons	West side of Nicholas Lane	St Edmund the King and Martyr
St Nicholas Olave	West side of Bread Street Hill	St Nicholas Cole Abbey (ibid)
St Olave's, Silver Street	Northeast end of Noble Street	Church of St Alban, Wood Street, London (ibid)
St Pancras, Soper Lane	Pancras Lane at Queen Street	St Mary-le-Bow (ibid)
St Peter, Paul's Wharf	Upper Thames Street at Peter's Hill	St Benet Paul's Wharf
St Peter, Westcheap	Southwest corner of Wood Street	St. Matthew Friday Street (ibid)
St Thomas the Apostle	St Thomas Apostle Street	St Mary Aldermary, Watling Street

== See also ==
- List of demolished churches in the City of London
- Great Fire of London
- List of Christopher Wren Churches in London

General:

- List of demolished buildings and structures in London

== Bibliography ==
- Betjeman, John (1992) [1967], Sovereign City of London Churches, Andover: Pitkin, ISBN 0-85372-565-9
- Huelin, G. (1996), Vanished Churches of the City of London, London: Guildhall Library Publications, ISBN 0-900422-42-4
- Reynolds, H. (1922), The Churches of the City of London, London: The Bodley Head Limited
