= Philipot =

Philipot is a surname. Notable people with the surname include:

- Fabrice Philipot (1965–2020), French road bicycle racer
- John Philipot (1588–1645), English officer of arms and politician
- John Philipot (MP) (died 1384), English merchant and alderman of London
- Margaret Stodeye, Lady Philipot (died 1431), English heiress
- Thomas Philipot (died 1682), English poet and writer
