= William Henry Overall =

English librarian and antiquary

William Henry Overall (1829–1888) was an English librarian and antiquary.

== Life ==
The son of William Henry Overall and Rosetta Davey, he was born on 18 January 1829 at St. John's Wood. He was educated at a private school and then at the newly opened City of London College, Crosby Hall, Bishopsgate. He entered the office of the town clerk at the Guildhall, City of London in 1847, and in 1857 was appointed sub-librarian of the Guildhall Library, which consisted of a few rooms in the front of the Guildhall. In 1865, on the death of William Turner Alchin, he received the appointment of librarian, and, on the completion of the new building in Basinghall Street at the eastern end of the Guildhall, he superintended the move of the collections to the new building and arranged the museum.

He was elected a Fellow of the Society of Antiquaries of London in May 1868. He was for many years a member of the councils of the Library Association and the London and Middlesex Archæological Society. He died at Crouch End, Middlesex, after a long illness, on 28 June 1888, and was buried in St. Pancras cemetery, Finchley, on 3 July.

== Works ==
In 1877 he was presented with the honorary freedom and livery of the Clockmakers' Company, whose library and museum of clocks and watches he had prepared a printed catalogue in 1875; which was followed in 1881 by his History of the company. In conjunction with his cousin, H. C. Overall, he prepared for the corporation library committee in 1878 an Analytical Index to the Series of Records known as the Remembrancia preserved among the Archives of the City of London, A.D. 1579–1664, with biographical and historical notes. This work was the outcome of an examination of the corporation records and a report on their condition.

Overall also wrote catalogues of various collections in the Guildhall Library, papers on antiquarian subjects, and:

- A Dictionary of Chronology, 1870;
- The Accounts of the Church-wardens of St. Michael, Cornhill, 1456–1608, edited in 1871;
- Civitas Londinum: a facsimile of Agas's Map of London, with an Introduction, 1874.

== Family ==
He was married, on 20 April 1851, to Mary Anne Elizabeth Bailey, by whom he had fourteen children, nine of whom survived him.
