= Alchin =

Alchin is a surname. Notable people with the surname include:

- Gordon Alchin (1894–1947), British politician
- Jason Alchin (born 1967), Australian rugby league footballer
- William Turner Alchin (1790–1865), English antiquarian and solicitor

== See also ==
- Allchin
