= St Botolph Billingsgate =

Former church in London, destroyed 1666

St Botolph's, Billingsgate
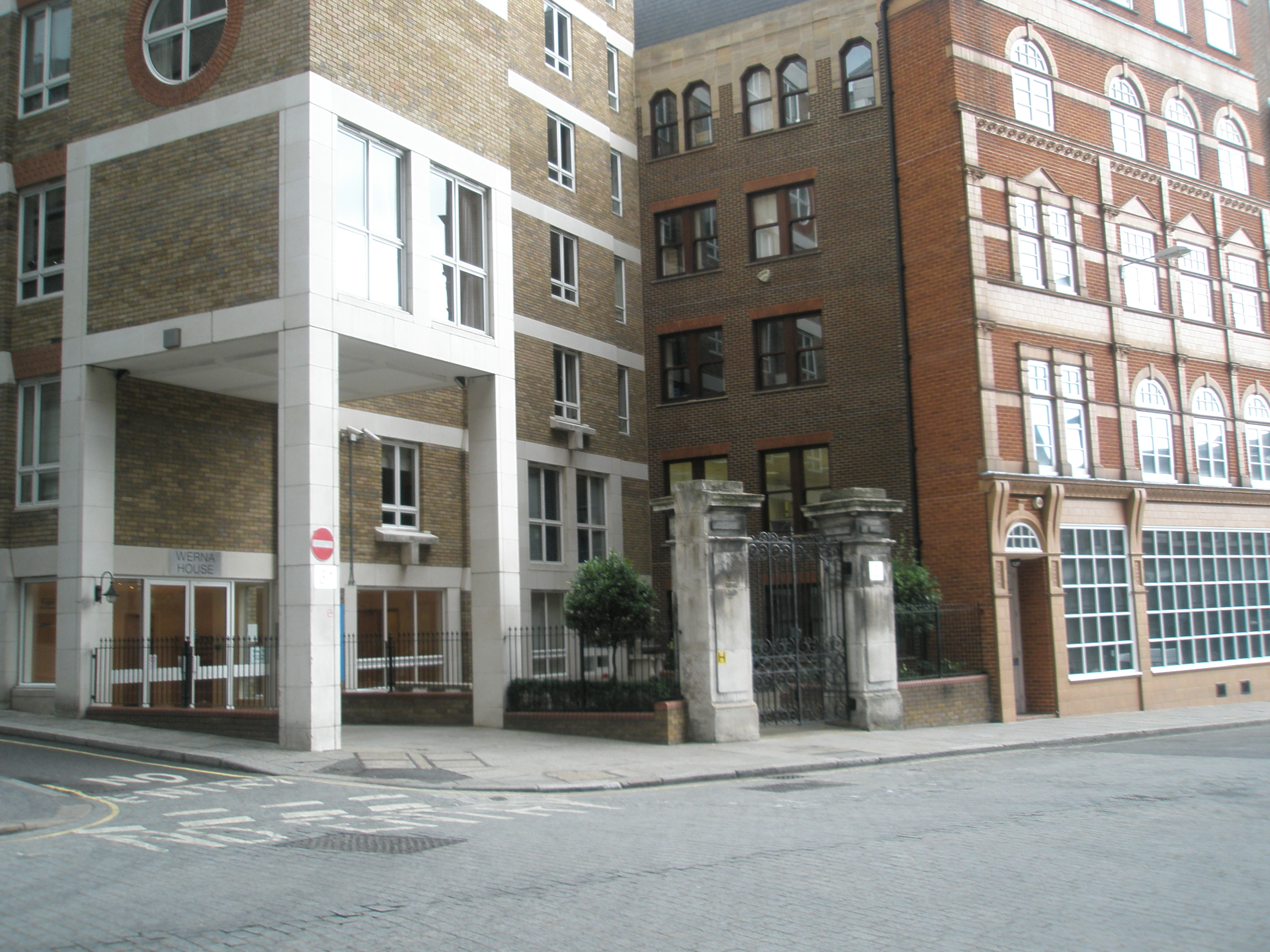
- The site of the churchyard
- St Botolph's, Billingsgate
- Denomination: Anglican

History
- Founded: 9th century

Architecture
- Demolished: 1666

St Botolph's, Billingsgate was a Church of England parish church in London. Of medieval origin, it was located in the Billingsgate ward of the City of London and destroyed by the Great Fire of London in 1666.

== History ==
The church, which dated back to medieval times, stood on the south side of Thames Street, at the corner of Botolph Lane. It was one of four churches in medieval London dedicated to St Botolph, a 7th-century East Anglian saint, each of which stood by one of the gates of the London Wall. The others erected were St Botolph's, Aldgate; St Botolph's, Aldersgate; and St Botolph's, Bishopsgate, all three of which survive. By the end of the 11th century Botolph was regarded as the patron saint of boundaries, and by extension of trade and travel. This was apt as the church was close to the city wharves and also to London Bridge, which at the time of the church's construction lay slightly further east.

During the 15th century the church was extended to the south over an undercroft. On the south side of this extension, at the south-east corner of the enlarged church, was a small stone-built vestry, which also had a cellar beneath. The parish rented out these cellars, usually to the same tenant. Archaeological excavations beneath part of the Billingsgate Lorry Park in 1982 uncovered the remains of the vault beneath the aisle of the church, and what may have been those of the one beneath the vestry.

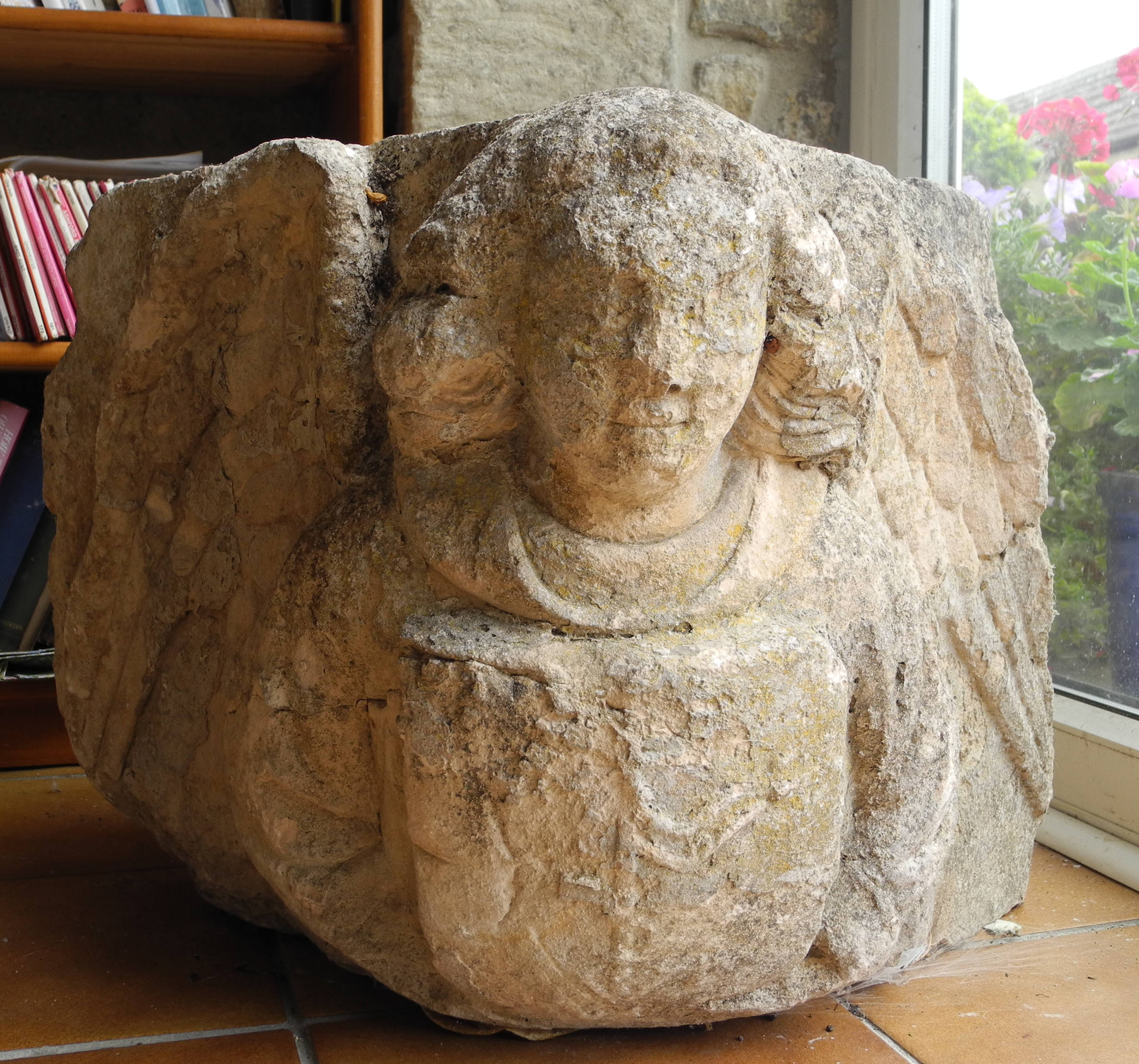
Angel corbel from St Botolph, accidentally cleared from the site by developers in 1984 and dumped on waste land in Thurrock, from where it was recovered and saved. It had gone unnoticed during the archaeological excavation. Mid-1440s, possibly from the extension built by John Reynewell.

A piece of land, formerly used as a passageway was given to the parish by the City corporation for use as an additional churchyard. Having been enclosed within a brick wall, it was consecrated in 1617. In 1620 the church was "repaired and beautified" at a cost of more than £600.

The composer Thomas Morley was buried in the churchyard.

== Destruction ==
St Botolph's, Billingsgate was destroyed by the Great Fire of London in 1666 and not rebuilt. Instead, the parish was united with that of St George Botolph Lane (which has itself since been united with St Mary-at-Hill). The site of the church and its adjoining churchyard continued to be used for burials, although a house was built on part of the site of the nave and rented out by the parish. In around 1677 a shop was built above a newly constructed burial vault in the churchyard and leased out for the benefit of the poor at a rent of £4 a year; a second vault was built, and a shop constructed over it in 1693. In the same year the site of the chancel was sold and the land used to widen the lane between Thames Street and Botolph Wharf.

The upper churchyard was also retained as a burial ground for the united parishes. It survives as a privately owned garden at the corner of Monument Street and Botolph Lane, under the name of "One Tree Park".

== Sources ==
- Newcourt, Richard (1708). Repetorium Ecclesiasticum Parochiale Londinense. Vol. 1. London.
- Seymour, Robert (1733). A Survey of the Cities of London and Westminster, Borough of Southwark, and Parts Adjacent. Vol. 1. London: T. Read.

51°30′34.87″N 0°5′5.03″W
