= Horndon =

Horndon may refer to the following places:

- Horndon, Devon, a location in England
- Horndon railway station, Essex, England
- Horndon-on-the-Hill, a village in Essex, England
  - Horndon mint, a mint
- West Horndon, a village in Essex, England
  - East Horndon, a village in Essex, England
- Darfield, New Zealand, formerly Horndon Junction
