= Allchin =

Allchin is a surname which may refer to:

- Basil Charles Allchin (1878–1957), British organist and teacher
- Bridget Allchin (1927–2017), British archaeologist
- Donald Allchin (1930–2010), British Anglican priest and theologian
- Jim Allchin (born 1951), American blues rock guitarist, computer scientist, and philanthropist
- Raymond Allchin (1923–2010), British archaeologist
- Sir William Allchin (1846–1912), English physician and lecturer
- William Thomas Howell Allchin (1843–1883), British organist, father of Basil

== See also ==
- Alchin
