= Adam Bamme =

English goldsmith and politician

Adam Bamme (died 1397) was an English goldsmith and politician who served two non-consecutive terms as Lord Mayor of London in the 14th century.

== Early career ==
Bamme's early origins are completely obscure, with nothing known about him prior to 1369. A member of the Goldsmiths' Company, he gained a reputation for skillful workmanship that earned him a place as a chief supplier to the household of John of Gaunt.

== Marriages and family ==
Bamme is known to have married twice. His first wife, whom he married in 1375, was the widow of another goldsmith, while his second was a Margaret Stodeye, a thrice-widowed, wealthy heiress, daughter of John Stodeye, MP. He had one son, Sir Richard Bamme, whose son in turn would serve as High Sheriff of Kent. Another goldsmith, Henry Bamme, may have been his brother; the latter succeeded him as alderman of Aldersgate.

== Political career ==
Bamme held a variety of political offices over the course of his life. He was one of the Sheriffs of the City of London in 1382–3, and an alderman for, successively, Aldersgate Ward (1382–3), Cripplegate Ward (1384-5, 1387–8), Cheap Ward (1388–1393), and Lime Street Ward (1393 until his death).

Bamme served his first term as mayor in 1390, succeeding William Venour, who was in a different faction in City politics of the time. During this term, Bamme negotiated the purchase of a very large quantity of grain which were sold on at fixed prices to those in need during national food shortages. This act was popular with the city's citizens, and helped gain Bamme a second term in 1397. Also during his first term, he issued a proclamation to silence the ongoing political dispute between the supporters of two previous mayors, Nicholas Brembre and John Northampton.

== Death ==
Bamme did not finish his second term as mayor. He died in office on 6 June 1397, and Richard II chose his replacement, Richard Whittington. He was buried at St George Botolph Lane.

== Sources ==
- Castor, Helen (2024). The Eagle and the Hart: The Tragedy of Richard II and Henry IV.
- Hatfield, Emma (2015). London's Lord Mayors: 800 Years of Shaping the City.
- Rawcliffe, Carole (1993). "Adam Bamme (d. 1397)". History of Parliament.
