= Margaret Stodeye, Lady Philipot =

Margaret Stodeye, Lady Philipot (other married names Berlingham, Fitznichol, and Bamme, d. 1431) was an English heiress known for her four sequential marriages to elite Londoners, including two Mayors of London. In each case her increasing wealth helped the political careers of these men. She then took a vow of chastity and had a quiet thirty-four-year widowhood. A contemporary of Geoffrey Chaucer, she has been compared to the five-times-widowed Wife of Bath in The Canterbury Tales.

== Early life ==
Margaret was the second of four daughters of vintner and politician John Stodeye and his wife Joan, née Gisors. Her sisters were Idonia, Margery, and Joan. Stodeye arranged prosperous marriages for three of his daughters: Idonia to politician Nicholas Brembre, Margery to fellow vintner Henry Vanner, and Margaret's first marriage. These two brothers-in-law were to loom large in Margaret's economic affairs during her married life. Joan, who entered Brembre's custody on her father’s death, went on to marry royal officer Thomas Goodlake in 1379.

== Married life ==
=== John Berlingham ===
By December 1370, Margaret was married to mercer and member of parliament John Berlingham. Berlingham and Nicholas Brembre appear in transactions concerning the Stodeye family in the 1370s. He and Margaret had two sons and a daughter, Idonia, but he died in October 1373 while she was pregnant with their third child. Margaret inherited a third of Berlingham’s considerable estate.

=== John Philipot ===
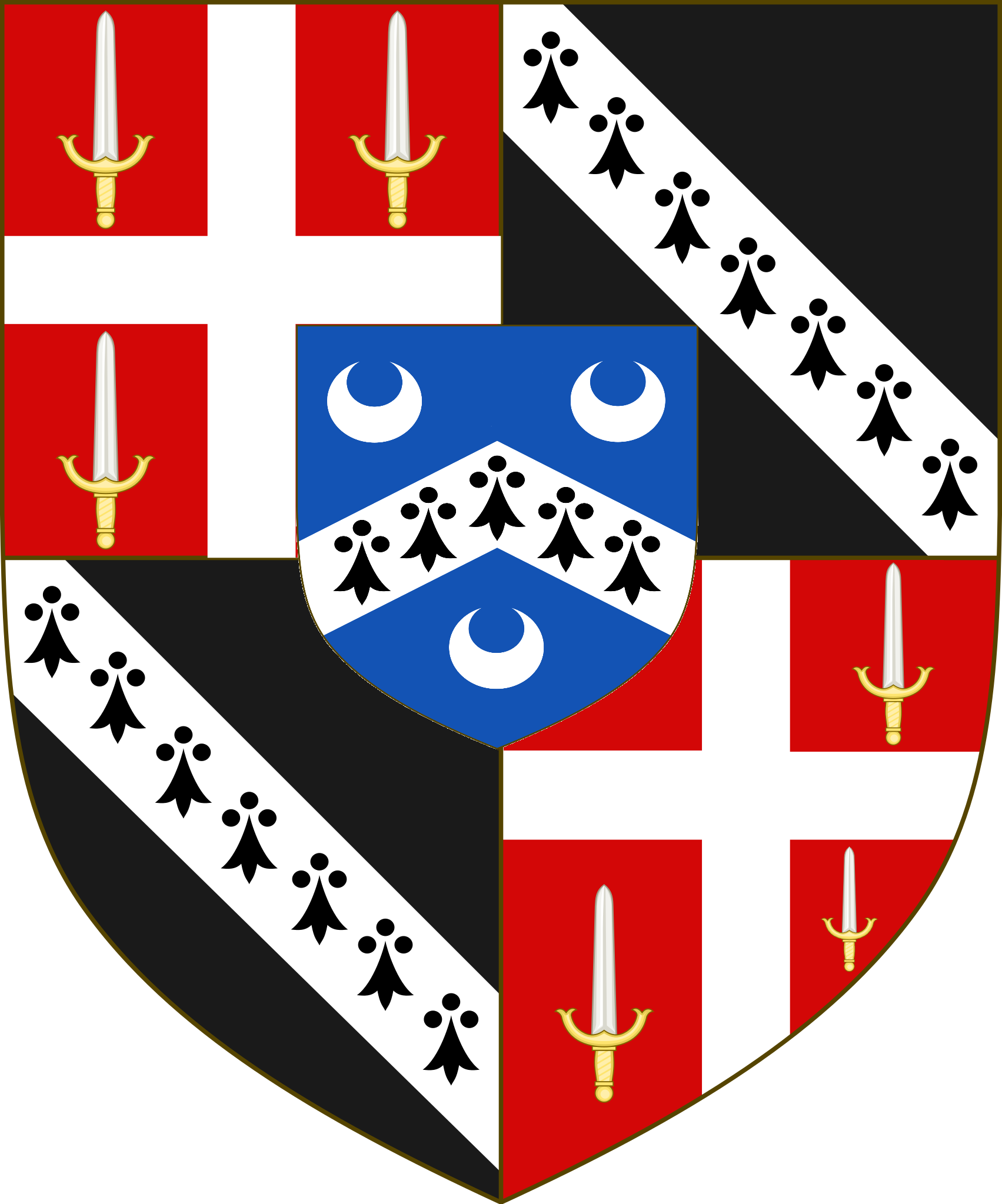
Arms of John Philipot awarded by Richard II

By March 1376 she had married her second husband, fishmonger and major landowner John Philipot, who was a colleague of Brembre’s. Philipot’s second wife had died at about the same time as Margaret’s first husband. Margaret’s fortune increased with the death of her father in 1376.

Brembre and Philipot dominated London politics in the 1380s, with Philipot being Lord Mayor of London in 1378. Margaret became Lady Philipot when her husband received a knighthood during the Peasants' Revolt in 1381. In his will he provided Margaret with a life estate, at the expense of his grown-up children, and made her responsible for some of the religious bequests in his will. Margaret’s sons with Berlingham were disinherited from their share in the Stodeye money in order to provide a marriage portion for Sir John Philipot's eldest daughter by his previous marriage; but Sir John was generous to Idonia Berlingham. Sir John died in 1384, and Margaret’s brothers-in-law Brembre and Vanner became trustees of all her property and made plans to marry her daughter Idonia Berlingham to an associate of Vanner’s.

=== John Fitznichol ===
Margaret married as her third husband bureaucrat John Fitznichol, who was trustee of Brembre’s country estates, in about 1387. Fitznichol was not as wealthy as Margaret's other husbands, but had close connections to the royal court. These connections led to Margaret’s sister Idonia marrying her second husband, Sir Baldwin Raddington, a member of the king's household. When Brembre was executed in 1388, Vanner and Fitznichol attempted to recover his property. Fitznichol died in 1391, leaving Margaret a life interest in his holdings in London.

=== Adam Bamme ===
Margaret’s fourth marriage was her 'most politically expedient.' She married Adam Bamme, a goldsmith who had been a political opponent of Brembre’s. Bamme helped Margaret to escape debt-payments and to recover money from Sir John Philipot's estate as well as some of Brembre's property. They had a son, Richard, in about 1397. Bamme died during his second term as Mayor of London that year.

== Widowhood ==
In her fourth widowhood, and in control of her own property after the death of her brothers-in-law Brembre and Vanner, Margaret decided to 'remove herself permanently from the marriage market' by taking a vow of chastity before the Bishop of London, seven weeks after her fourth husband’s death. Brembre and Vanner having had no surviving children, Margaret and the children of her youngest sister Joan inherited the last of the Stodeye inheritance after the deaths of Brembre's and Vanner's wives, and Margaret inherited further property on the death of her relative Joan Gisors. After selling some of her holdings to clear Bamme's debts, she had an annual income of £116. She went by the name Lady Philipot, but asked to be buried next to Adam Bamme. Her will makes no mention of her first or third husbands or of her three children by Berlingham, but she involved her youngest son Richard Bamme in property conveyances from 1407 and left all her London holdings to him on her death in 1431.
