= William Turner Alchin =

English antiquarian and solicitor

William Turner Alchin (1790 – 3 February 1865) was an English antiquarian and solicitor.

== Life ==
Alchin was born at St. Mary-at-Hill, Billingsgate in the City of London. For nearly twenty years he practised as a solicitor at Winchester. On the retirement of William Herbert as librarian of the Guildhall Library, London in 1845, Alchin was appointed to the office, which he held until his death, which occurred at Chelsea on 3 February 1865.

== Works ==
During the latter part of his time at Winchester he was engaged in the compilation of indexes to the ecclesiastical registers, etc. of the city and of Salisbury. These indexes have been important to genealogists and antiquaries. He also made indexes to the ancient records of the Corporation of the City of London, and a calendar of the wills enrolled in the Court of Hustings of London.
