= St Augustine Papey =

Coordinates: 51.5148°N 0.0796°W

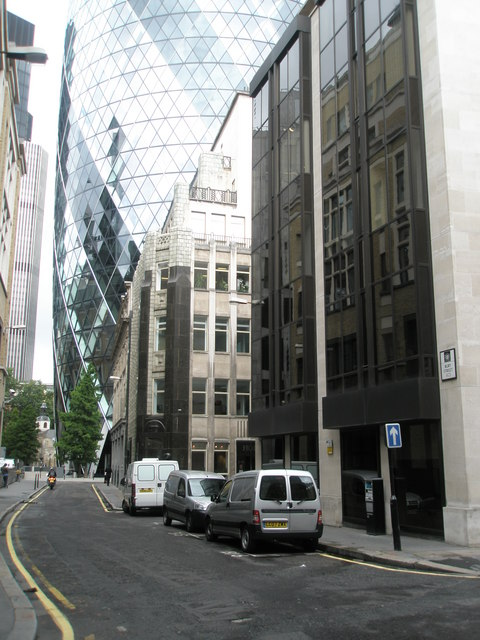
- Current photo of site
- St Augustine Papey
- Location: London
- Country: England

History
- Founded: 1170

Architecture
- Closed: 1442
- Demolished: 1547

St Augustine Papey was a mediaeval church in the City of London situated just south of London Wall opposite the north end of St. Mary Axe Street. First mentioned as "Sci augustini pappey", it originally belonged to the Priory of Holy Trinity. By 1430, the emoluments had become so small that it was united with All Hallows-on-the-Wall and in 1442 was appropriated as an almshouse for elderly clergy. At the time of the Dissolution of the Monasteries it was demolished and the site built over. The churchyard was acquired by St Martin Outwich in 1539, and survives to this day on Camomile Street
