= St Andrew Hubbard =

Coordinates: 51°30′36″N 0°5′0″W

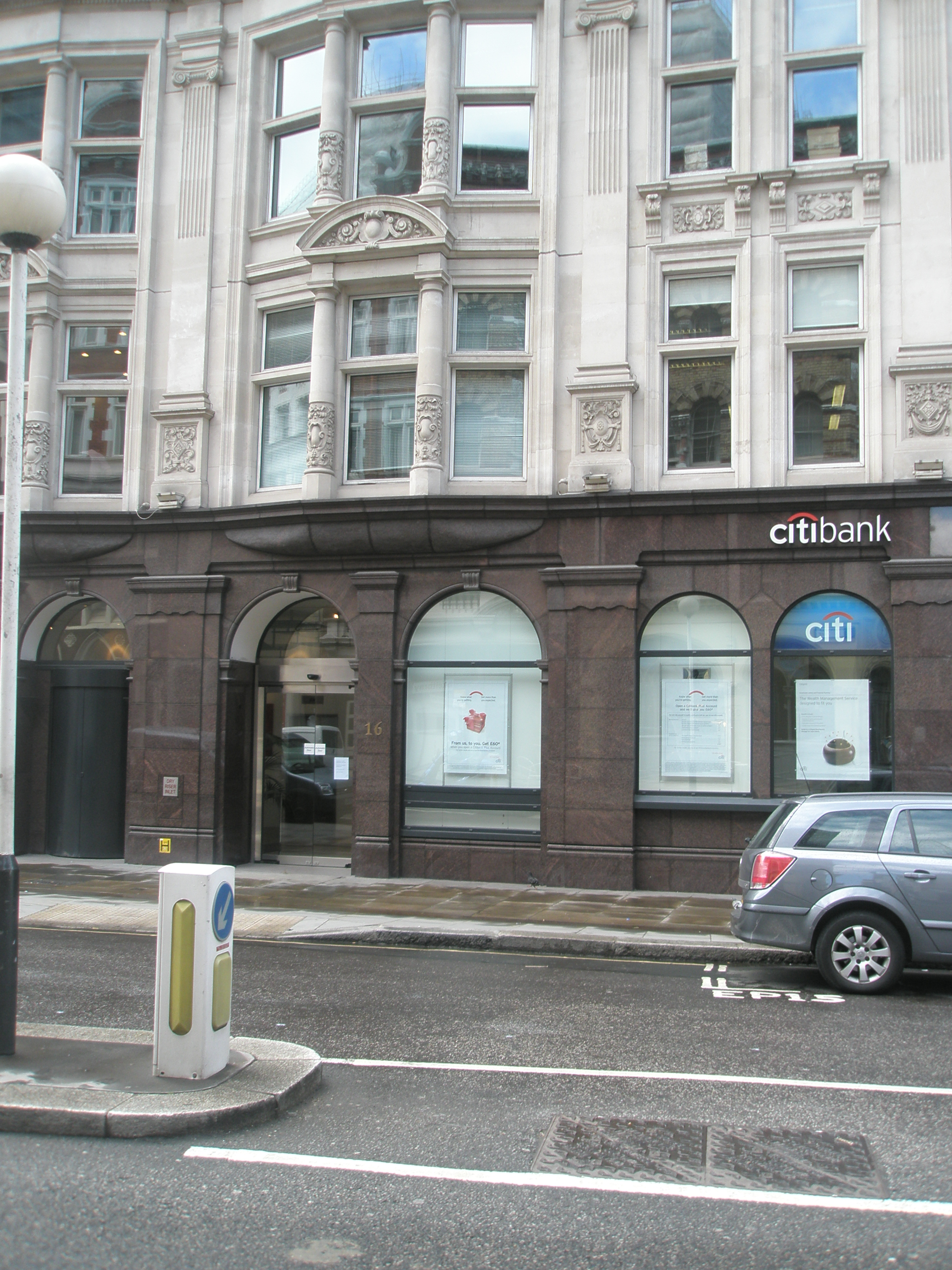
- Current photo of site
- St Andrew Hubbard
- Location: Rope Lane (now Lovat Lane), London
- Country: England
- Denomination: Church of England

Architecture
- Demolished: 1666

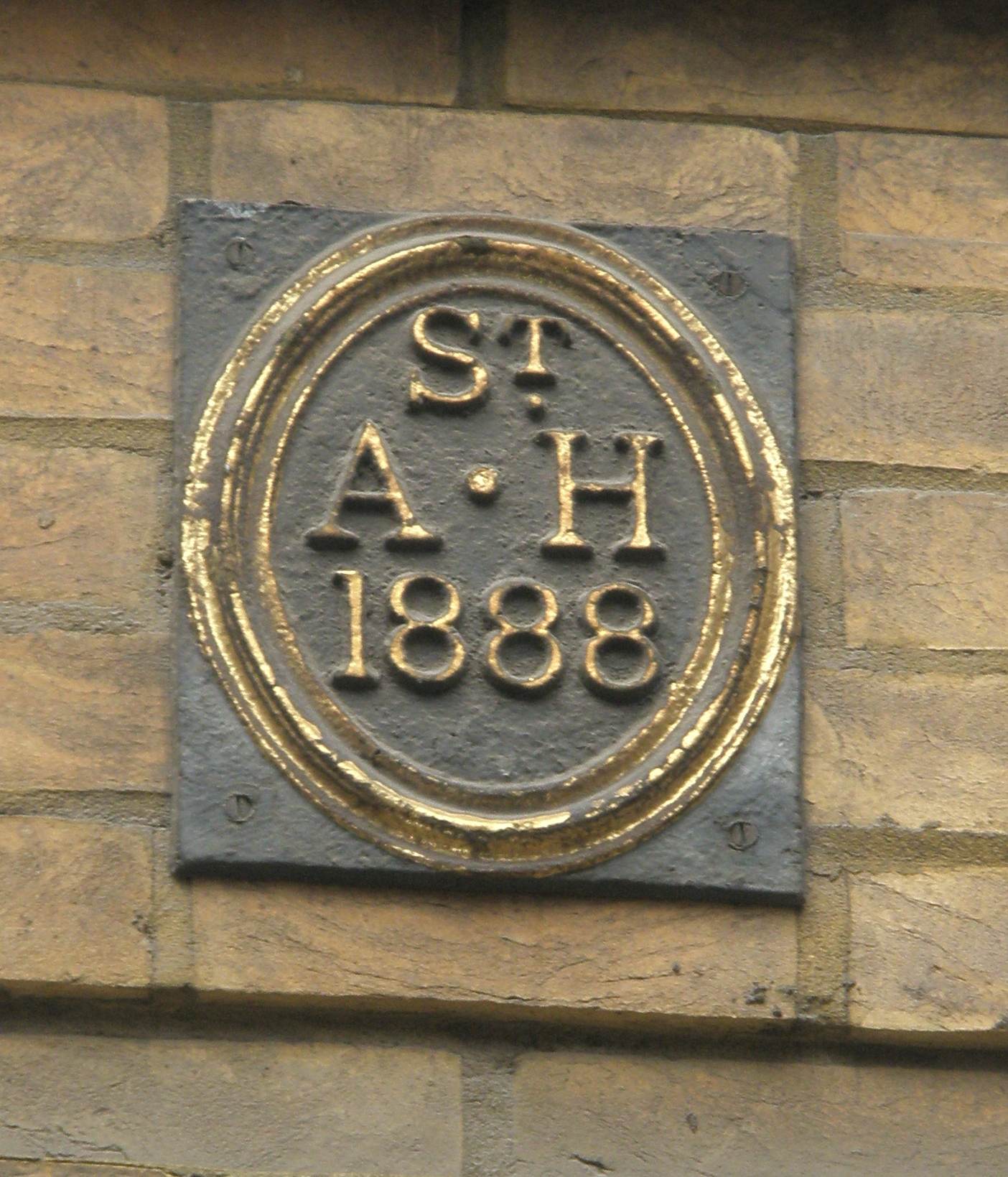
Parish boundary mark.

St Andrew Hubbard was a parish church in the Billingsgate ward of the City of London. It was destroyed in the Great Fire of London in 1666, and not rebuilt.

== History ==
The church stood in the Billingsgate ward of the City of London. The east end of the church adjoined Rope Lane, later known as Lucas Lane and then Love Lane; it is now called Lovat Lane. It took its name from Hubert, a mediaeval benefactor. Its parish records are among the most detailed in the United Kingdom, and have been extensively researched.

The church was repaired and "richly beautified" in 1630, at a cost to the parishioners of more than £600. It was destroyed in the Great Fire of London in 1666 and not rebuilt. Instead the parish was united with that of St Mary-at-Hill and the site sold to the city authorities. Part of the land was used to widen the roadway, and the rest to build the Royal Weigh House. A parish vestry was built at the east end of the weighhouse, beneath which were "a Portico, Publick Stocks, a Cage, and a Little Room".

A Parish boundary mark can be found in nearby Philpot Lane. Today Citibank occupies part of the site.
