= St Mary-at-Hill =

Church in the City of London

Coordinates: 51.510069°N 0.08374°W

- Parish Church of Saint Mary at Hill
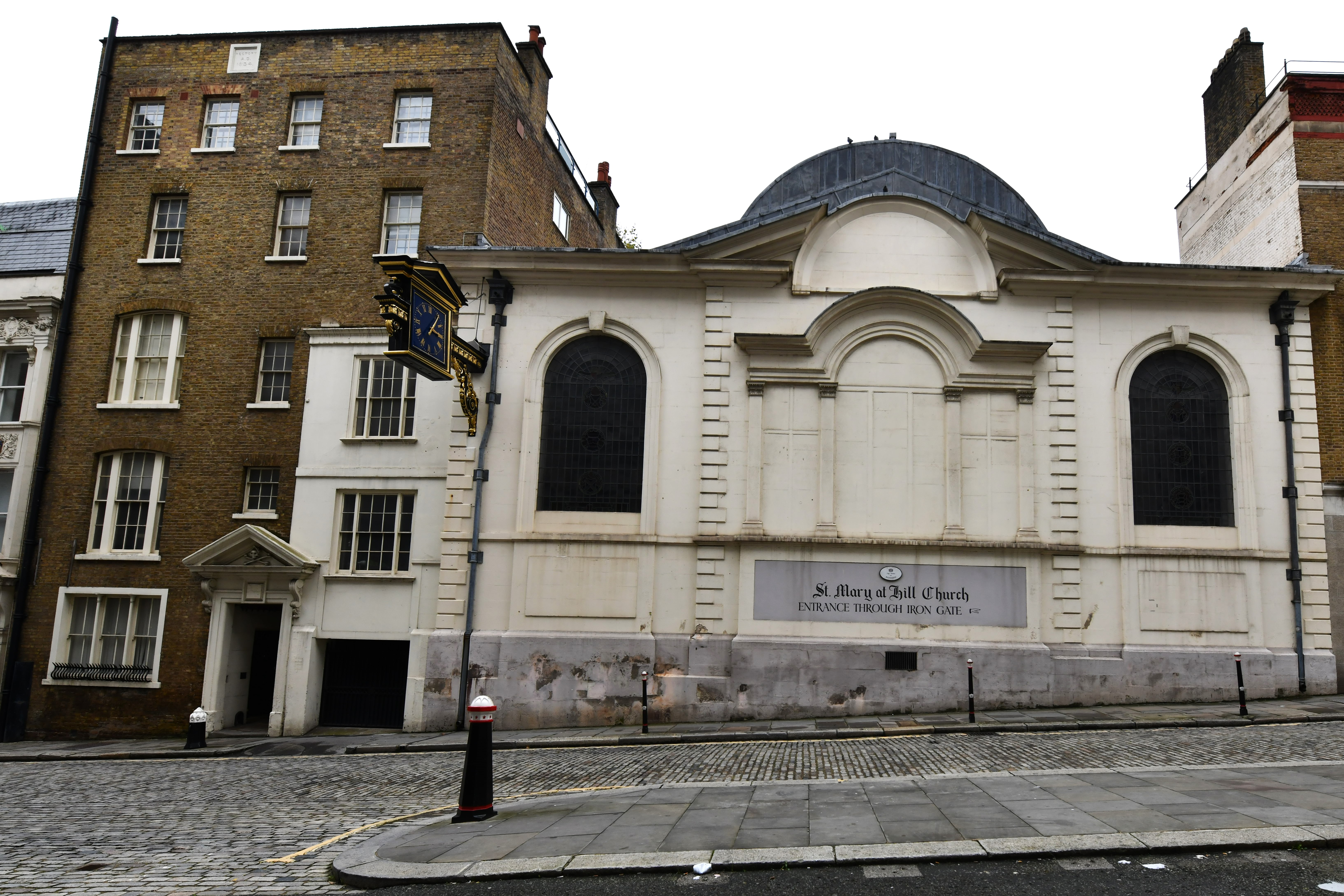
- East facade with blocked-up Venetian window

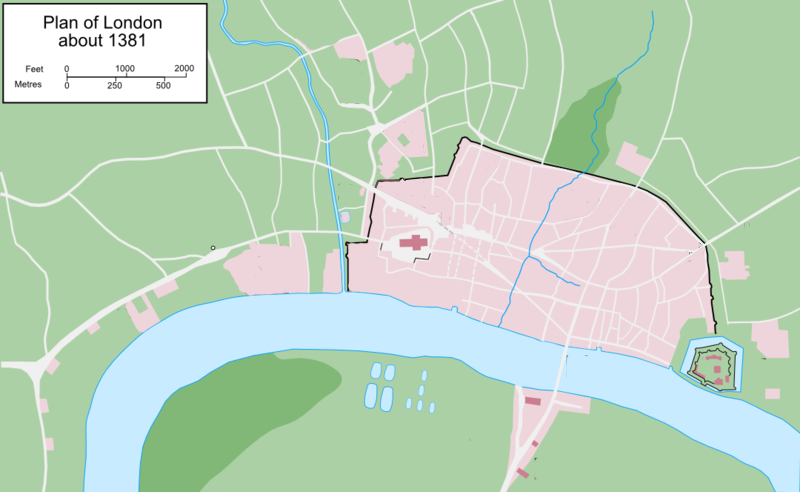
- Location within City of London Location within City of London in 1300
- Location: Lovat Lane, City of London, EC3
- Country: England
- Denomination: Church of England
- Previous denomination: Roman Catholic (to 1536)
- Website: stmaryathill.org

History
- Founded: c. 11th century
- Dedication: Mary, mother of Jesus

Architecture
- Heritage designation: Grade I listed building
- Architect: Sir Christopher Wren
- Style: English Baroque

Administration
- Diocese: London
- Parish: St Mary-at-Hill with St Andrew Hubbard, Eastcheap; St George, Botolph Lane; and St Botolph by Billingsgate

Clergy
- Bishop(s): Sarah Mullally, Bishop of London

St Mary-at-Hill is a Church of England parish church in the Ward of Billingsgate, City of London. It is situated on Lovat Lane, a cobbled street off Eastcheap.

It was founded in the 12th century as "St Mary de Hull" or "St Mary de la Hulle". It was severely damaged in the Great Fire of London in 1666. It was only partially rebuilt and has been much altered since, although some of its mediaeval fabric survives. Following the closure of three neighbouring churches, her parish is now called "St Mary-at-Hill with St Andrew Hubbard, Eastcheap; St George, Botolph Lane; and St Botolph by Billingsgate". The congregation of St Anne's Lutheran Church shares St Mary-at-Hill with its Anglican congregation.

The Church of St Mary-at-Hill is situated among some of the city's most ancient lanes: St Mary at Hill EC3, which has a large double-faced clock extending several feet into the street and which provides the best view of the church's elegant exterior; a narrow alleyway running alongside, but with no right of way; and, its entrance on Lovat Lane EC3, its postal address.

== History and architecture ==
A document of 1177 refers to an 'ancient' church on this site, implying a foundation in the 11th century or earlier. In 1336, a Rose Wrytell paid to establish a chantry. The north aisle was rebuilt at the end of the 15th century, and a south aisle and steeple were added a little later. John Stow, writing at end of the 16th century, described it as "the fair church of Saint Marie, called on the Hill, because of the ascent from Billingsgate".

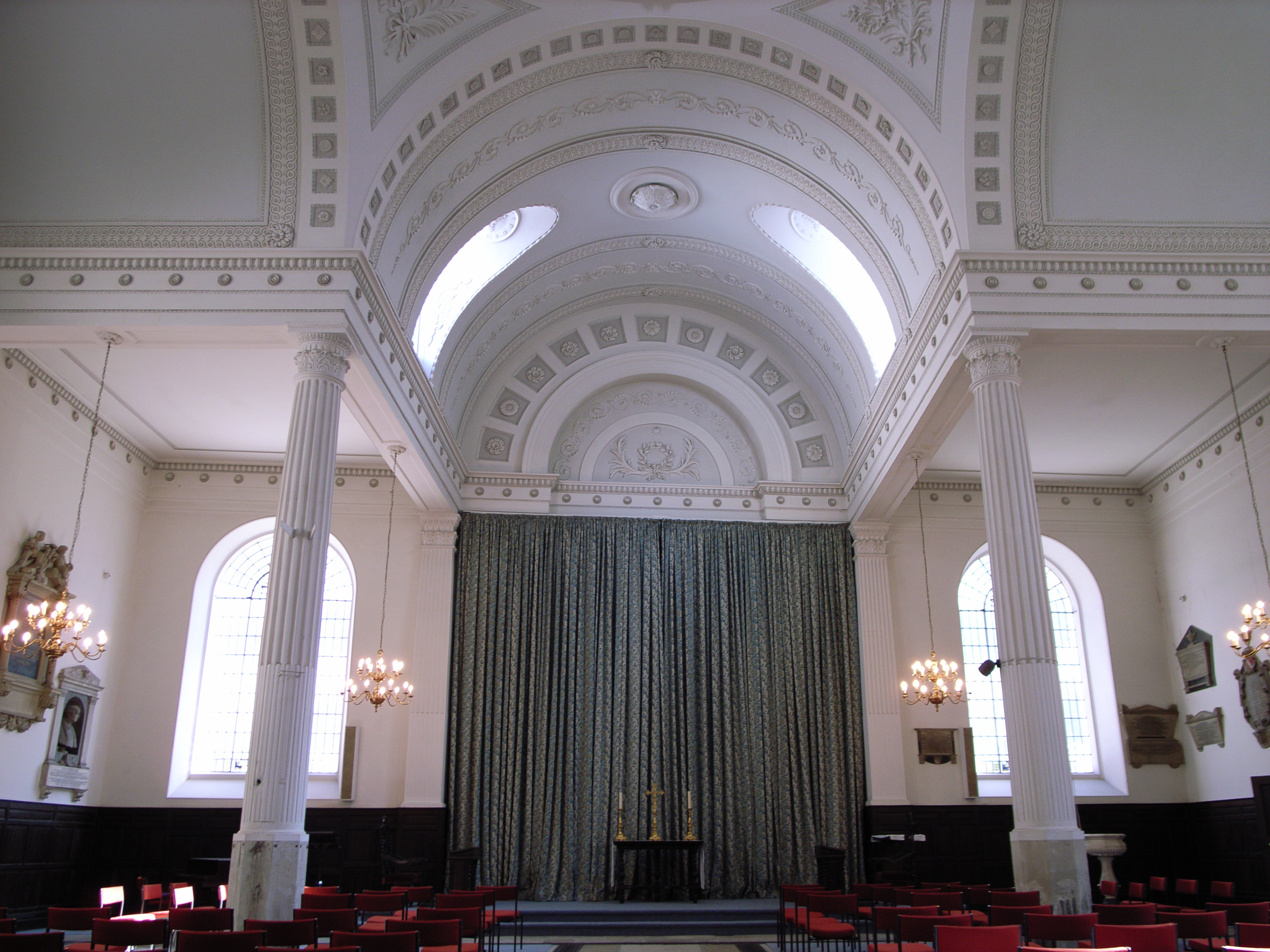
Interior

The Great Fire of 1666 started in the neighbouring street of Pudding Lane severely damaging the church. After the blaze, the parish of St Mary's was united with that of St Andrew Hubbard, whose church was not rebuilt.

Sir Christopher Wren rebuilt the church's interior and east end, managing to retain its medieval walls on the other three sides, and the west tower to which he added a lantern. Wren included in his design a venetian window at the east end, now blocked up, and a pediment, now broken. His interior displays four free-standing corinthian columns, supporting barrel vaults in a Greek cross pattern, and a coffered central dome. The church is 96 ft long and 60 ft wide.

A hoard of coins (now known as the Mary Hill Hoard) was found in a basement near St Mary-at-Hill in the 18th century. The hoard included the only known example of a coin from the Horndon mint.

There have been considerable further alterations since the 17th century. In 1787–88, George Gwilt rebuilt the west wall and replaced the tower in brick and in 1826–27 James Savage installed round-headed iron-framed windows in the north wall and replaced the vaults, ceilings and plasterwork. In 1848–49 he added a cupola to the dome and cut windows through the chancel vault. In 1849, the 17th century woodwork was sympathetically augmented and adapted by W. Gibbs Rogers. In 1904 the church's parish was united with that of St George Botolph Lane (to which had already been united St Botolph Billingsgate), and St Mary-at-Hill received the sword rests, plate, royal arms, ironwork, organ and organ case from St George. In 1939, the writer Dornford Yates used the church as a setting for some of the action in his thriller Gale Warning, calling it “St. Ives”. Use is made of the open-work screens on the roof.

The church survived the Blitz in the Second World War unscathed, but was severely damaged by a fire in 1988, after which its roof and ceiling required rebuilding. At first it was proposed to make the church redundant, but a full restoration was soon promised and the roof, the plaster vaults and the dome were put back in 1990–91. Most of the interior fittings and woodwork survived the fire and were not destroyed. To date, the interior otherwise remains a bleak shell as the fine woodwork which includes the pulpit, reredos and other pieces of furniture, have not been reinstated and remain in storage even though the church has been in use again for two decades, despite pressure from preservationists and the Georgian Group.

Writing before St Mary's 1988 fire, John Betjeman said of the church: "This is the least spoiled and the most gorgeous interior in the City, all the more exciting by being hidden away among cobbled alleys, paved passages, brick walls, overhung by plane trees…"

The church was designated a Grade I listed building on 4 January 1950. On the street St Mary at Hill, there is an adjacent Grade II brick and stone rectory of 1834 designed by James Savage, incorporating a vestry of the late 17th century.

== Music and traditions ==
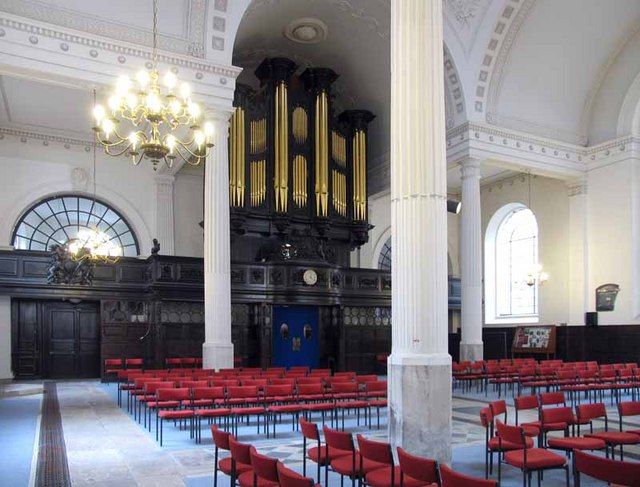
The organ at St Mary-at-Hill Church.

From 1510 the Chapel Royal choir sang here. The organ-builder Mighaell Glocetir worked at St Mary-at-Hill from 1477 to 1479. He is possibly the same person as Myghell Glancets who worked on St Michael, Cornhill, in 1475.

The composer Thomas Tallis was organist at St Mary-at-Hill between 1538–1539.

A William Hill organ was installed in 1848 and partly restored after the 1988 fire, but its complete restoration did not commence until 2000. The church is a popular venue for its regular concerts and recitals.

In several books on English folklore, or about ceremonies of London, there is mention of the Costermongers' Festival held here every October. It also goes by the name "Fish Harvest Festival" or "Harvest of the Sea", associated with the fishmarket that was held at Billingsgate. Another notable ceremony is Beating the Bounds, where notables and children process around the boundary of a parish or ward on Ascension Day, carrying slender rods. Originally the children were whipped (not severely) at points along the route. Almost every such example died out in the middle of the 19th century, but the account books of St Mary-at-Hill testify to its existence here. Four shillings were paid for the provision of fruit on the day of the "Perambulation" in 1682. In another example at Chelsea the whipped children were given four pence. Rare surviving examples of Beating the Bounds are at the nearby City Church of All Hallows-by-the-Tower (every three years), and at The Queen's Chapel of The Savoy, Westminster.

== Burials ==
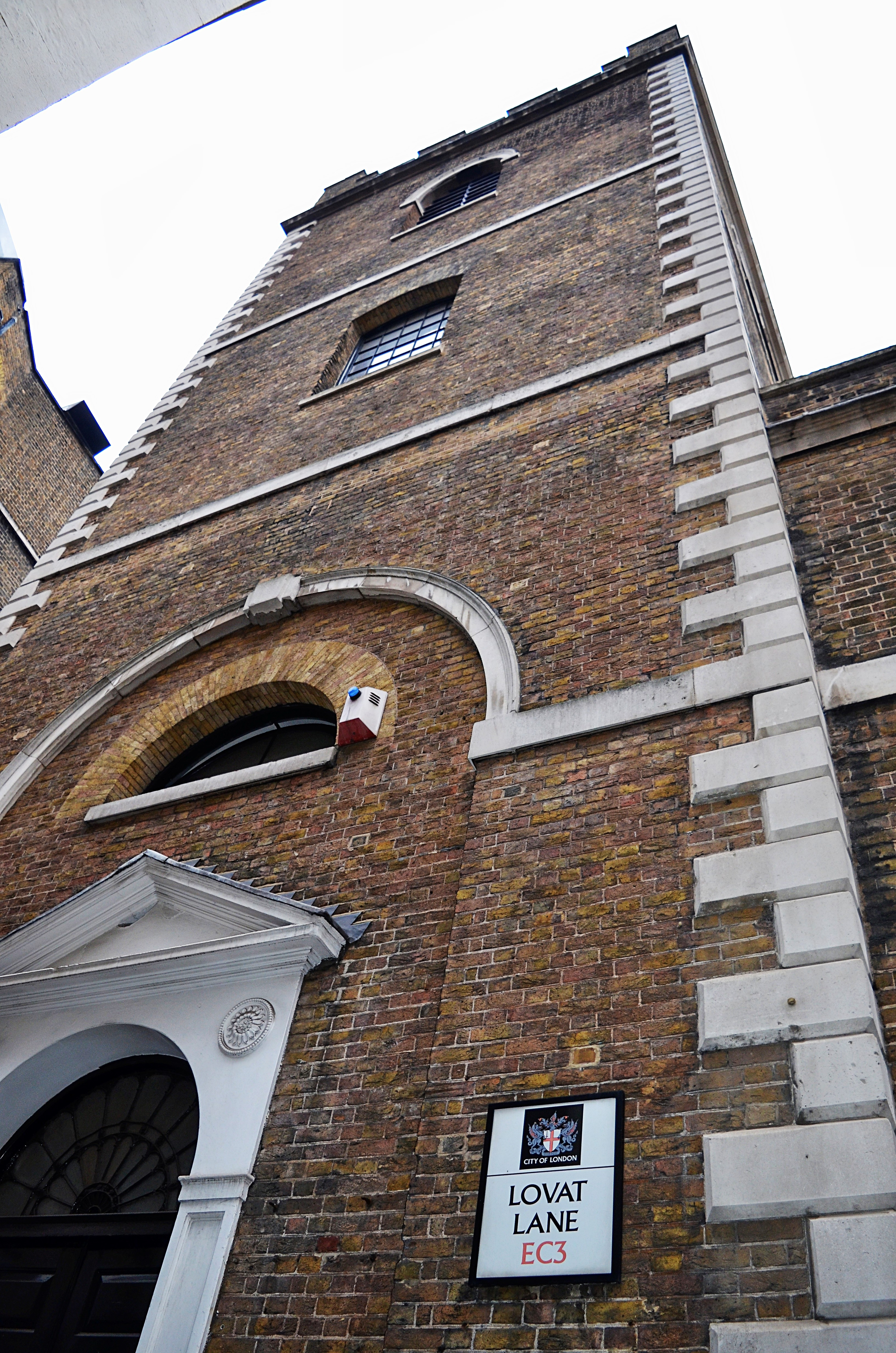
The tower of Mary-at-Hill with street sign.

Parliament outlawed new burials in the City of London during the Victorian era, forcing the closure of its churchyards; in 1847 the Church purchased burials rights 'in perpetuity' in a small section of the consecrated ground at West Norwood Cemetery for the parish's own use. It stood out from the main cemetery through its railed enclosure and planting, including monkey puzzle trees.

The London Borough of Lambeth subsequently compulsorily-purchased the main cemetery and removed the memorials in this section during 1990–91. A subsequent Chancery Court hearing found this to be illegal and ordered a mechanism be set up to restore those monuments at the request of descendants.

== Notable people ==
- Richard Beearde, hymn writer, was Rector of St Mary-at-Hill, 1560–1574
- Cuthbert Buckle, a Sheriff of the City of London and later a Lord Mayer of London, was a parishioner of St Mary-at-Hill, buried there in July, 1594
- Edward Young, poet and author of Night Thoughts, was married at St Mary-at-Hill in 1731
- Sarah Elizabeth Utterson, translator and author, was born in 1781 in the parish
- John Brand, an antiquarian, was appointed Rector of St Mary-at-Hill in 1784
- William Turner Alchin, another antiquarian, was born 1790 in the parish
- Wilson Carlile, founder of the Church Army, was a minister at the church in the late 19th/early 20th century
- Rose Hudson-Wilkin, the previous priest-in-charge, was also Chaplain to the Speaker of the House of Commons and is now, at November 2019, Bishop of Dover, the first black woman to be consecrated a bishop in the Church of England.

== See also ==
- List of churches and cathedrals of London
- List of Christopher Wren churches in London
- 17th-century Western domes
