= St Mary Staining =

Coordinates: 51°31′0″N 0°5′42″W

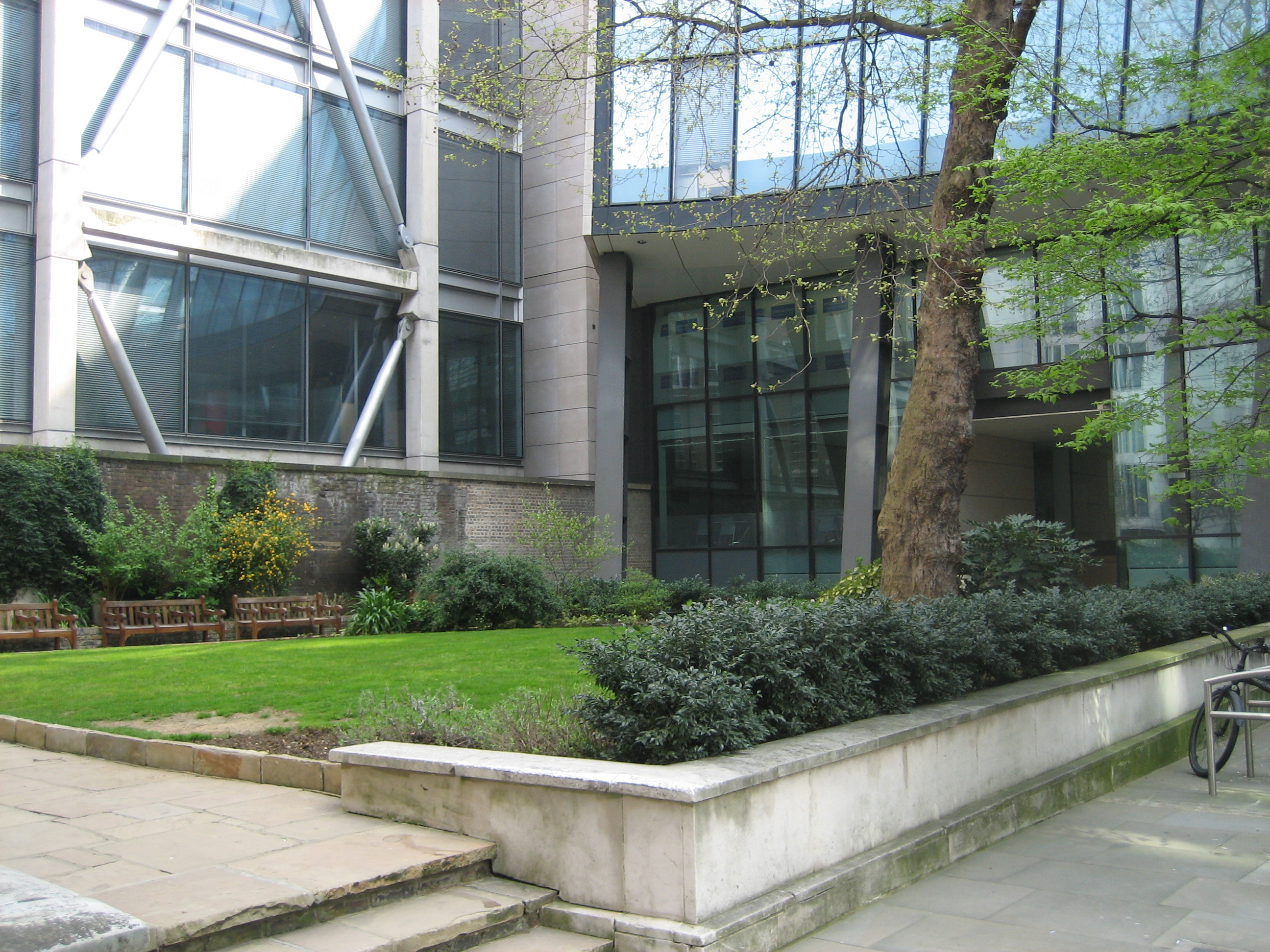
- Photo of the current site
- St Mary Staining
- Location: Oat Lane, City of London
- Country: England
- Denomination: Anglican

Architecture
- Years built: 10th century
- Demolished: 1666

St. Mary Staining was a parish church in Oat Lane, northeast of St. Paul's Cathedral, in the City of London. First recorded in the 12th century, it was destroyed in the Great Fire of London in 1666 and not rebuilt.

== History ==
The first reference to it is to "Ecclesia de Staningehage" in 1189, probably deriving from a family from Staines holding land in the area of the church. It was destroyed in the Great Fire of London in 1666 and not rebuilt. Its parish was united to St. Michael Wood Street in 1670, and later to St. Alban Wood Street in 1894, and finally St. Vedast Foster Lane in 1954.

Nikolaus Pevsner found a "few battered tombstones" in nearby Oat Lane. Since 1965 its site has been a City of London Corporation garden, containing a historic tree; an adjacent office block was built semi-circular so as not to damage it.
