= St Swithin, London Stone =

Coordinates: 51°30′42″N 0°5′22″W

St. Swithin, London Stone
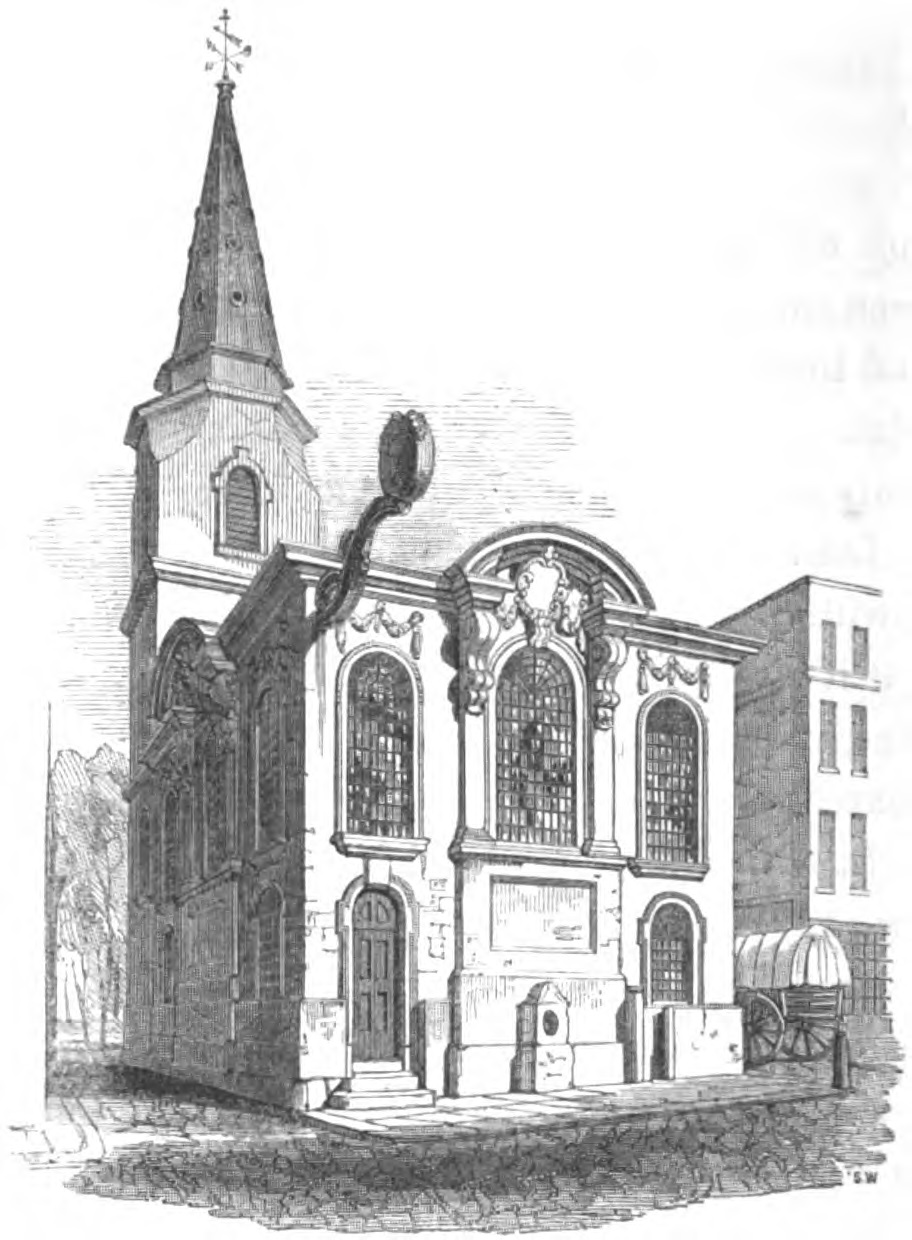
- St Swithin's Church, with the London Stone housed at front beneath its central window
- St. Swithin, London Stone
- Location: Cannon Street, London
- Country: England
- Denomination: Church of England

Architecture
- Architect: Christopher Wren
- Style: Baroque
- Closed: 1940
- Demolished: 1962

St Swithin, London Stone, was an Anglican church in the City of London. It stood on the north side of Cannon Street, between Salters' Hall Court and St Swithin's Lane, which runs north from Cannon Street to King William Street and takes its name from the church. Of medieval origin, it was destroyed by the Great Fire of London, and rebuilt to the designs of Sir Christopher Wren. It was badly damaged by bombing during the Second World War, and the remains were demolished in 1962.

== Medieval church ==
St Swithin's Church was first recorded in the 13th century, and was dedicated to Saint Swithin, a 9th-century bishop of Winchester. At first known as "St Swithin in Candlewick Street" (the medieval name of Cannon Street), in 1597 it was referred to as "St Swithin at London Stone", and this became the normal designation. London Stone itself stood on the south side of Candlewick Street, opposite the church.

One of the earliest references to the church is as the final resting place of Catrin Glyndŵr, wife of rebel Edmund Mortimer and daughter of Owain Glyndŵr, the legendary Welsh leader. She was taken hostage when the English recaptured Harlech Castle in 1409, and incarcerated in the Tower of London. Catrin Glyndŵr died in mysterious circumstances four years later. The only record of her death is in the Exchequer documents of 1413: "for expenses and other charges incurred for the burial of the wife of Edmund Mortimer and her daughters, buried within St Swithin's Church London ... £1".

The church was rebuilt at the expense of Sir John Hind in 1420, renovated in 1607–1608, and again, shortly before the Great Fire, at a cost of £1,000.

The patronage of the church belonged to the priory of Tortington in Sussex until the Dissolution of the Monasteries, following which Henry VIII granted it, along with the prior of Tortington's nearby London house, to John, Earl of Oxford. After passing through the hands of several owners both mansion and the patronage of the church were bought by the Salters Company.

== Rebuilding after the Great Fire ==
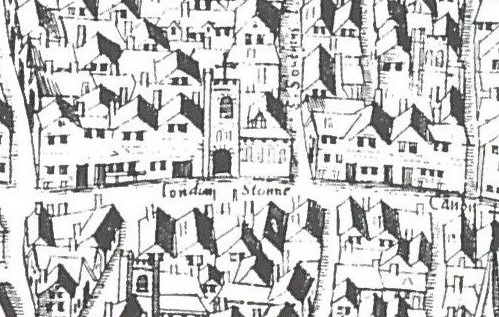
St Swithin's Church and London Stone as shown on the "Copperplate" map of c.1553–59

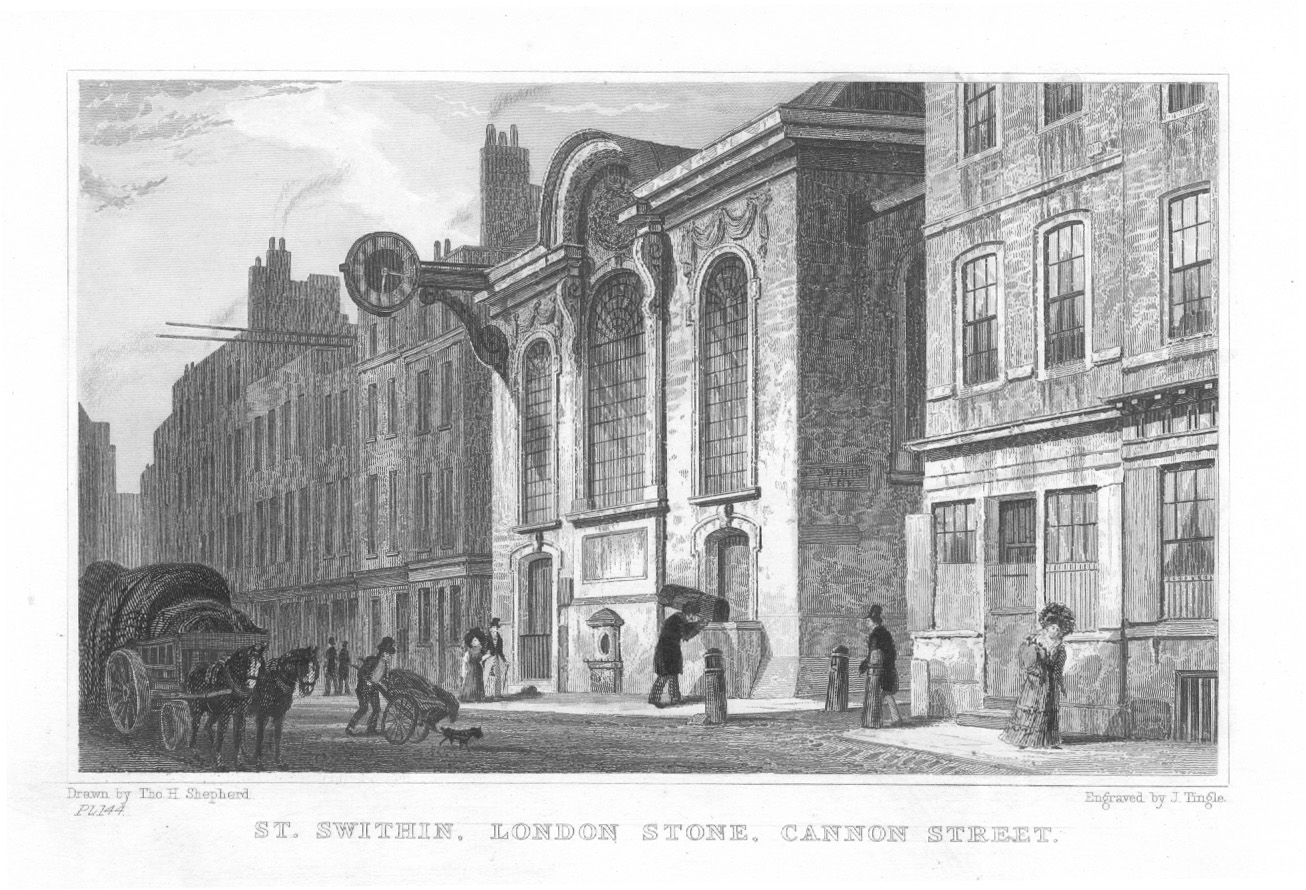
The south front of Wren's church of St Swithin London Stone, in an engraving after T. H. Shepherd, 1831.

Destroyed in the Great Fire of London in 1666, the church was rebuilt to a design by Sir Christopher Wren in 1678 at a cost of £4,687 4s 6d. The parish was united with that of St Mary Bothaw, also destroyed in the fire, but not rebuilt. The new church was 61 feet long and 42 feet wide. It had a tower and spire rising from the north-west corner of the building, with a total height of about 150 feet.

The south, east and west fronts each had three windows, with an elliptical pediment over the central one; the pediment on the south front, towards Cannon Street, was decorated with a carved wreath, flanked by festoons in high relief, while the heads of the flanking windows were decorated with festoons of drapery. This decoration was omitted on the other sides. Most of the length of the north side had other buildings against it.

The church was rectangular in plan. The northwest corner was occupied by the tower, and the rest of the north side was taken by an aisle, containing a gallery. Most of the church, however, was covered by an octagonal dome, springing from seven half-columns against the walls, and from one complete column in front of the north gallery. Robert Seymour described the building in 1733:

This church and tower are well built with Stone, the Roof covered with lead, supported with Demy-Columns of the Composite Order; the floor is paved with stone, and pewed, with three Isles...and the whole is commodious and pleasant, tho' small.

An organ was installed in 1805.

== Later history ==
In 1742 London Stone, from which the church took its name, was moved from the south side of the street to a location beside the church door. Eventually in the 1820s it was placed in an alcove within a stone casing set into the south wall of the church, where it remained until the demolition of the church in 1962.

In around 1820 repairs were made under the supervision of Henry Elmes. Further repairs, and internal alterations, were made in 1869. The pews, which had formerly faced south, were cut down and turned towards the east, galleries were removed, the pulpit was lowered and its sounding board taken away, and a brass chandelier that had hung from the centre of the dome taken down. In 1879 the chancel was remodelled, and a vestry constructed beneath the north gallery.

In 1940, during the Second World War, the church was badly damaged in an air raid. Only the pulpit was salvaged; it is now at All Hallows by the Tower. The church was not rebuilt; instead the parish was united with that of St Stephen Walbrook in 1954, and the site sold in 1960. The ruined church was finally demolished in 1961–1962.

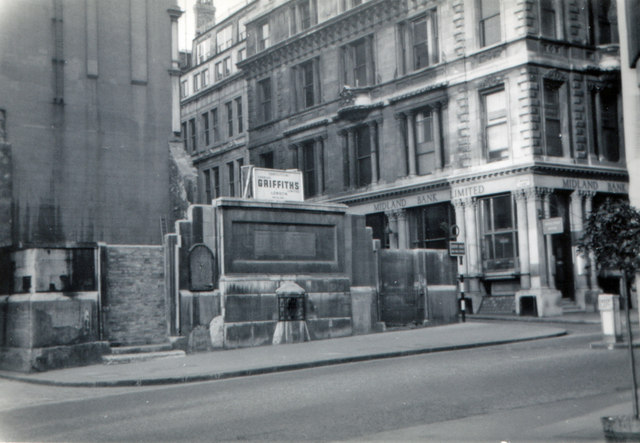
Demolition of the Wren church, 1961–1962

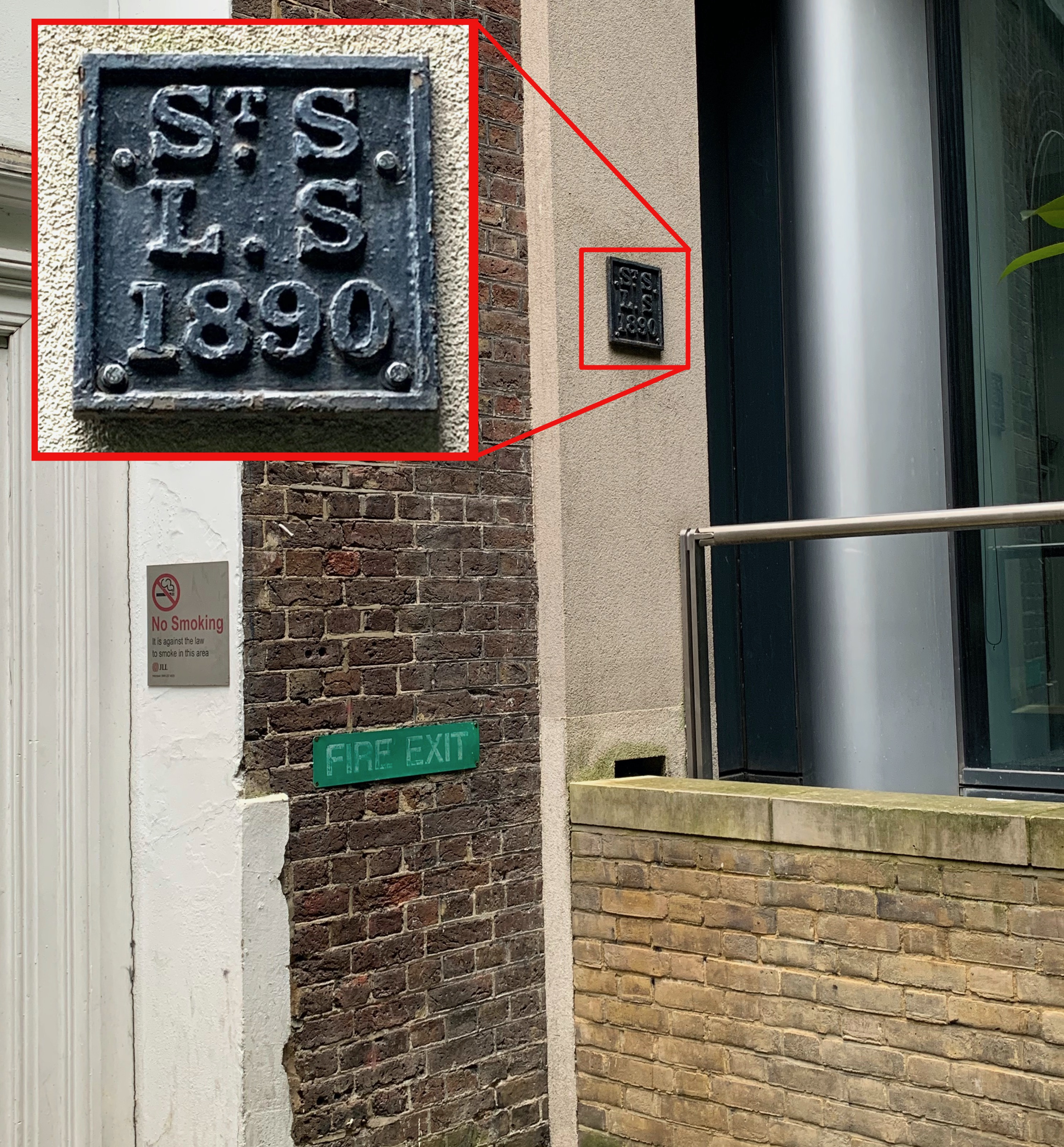
Parish boundary marker for St Swithin London Stone in Oxford Court off Cannon Street

Excavations were carried out on the site by Professor W. F. Grimes on behalf of the Roman and Medieval London Excavation Council. The northern edge of a Roman street on the line of Cannon Street was discovered, with timber and stone buildings to the north of it. Foundations of the early 15th-century church were discovered below those of the Wren church. The medieval church, which was slightly smaller than the Wren church, consisted of three bays, with a nave and north and south aisles. This structure, presumably the rebuilding of 1420, replaced an earlier church of which few traces remained; these suggested it had been a simple building with a nave and a single aisle, dating to the 12th century. A medieval grave slab of Purbeck marble was found reused in the foundations of the Wren church. The inscription revealed that it had covered the heart-burial of Joanna, wife of Fulke de St Edmond, who had been one of the sheriffs of the City of London in 1289–1290. The slab is now in the Museum of London.

London Stone was installed in the front of the new building, numbered 111 Cannon Street. The churchyard was retained as a public garden, St Swithin's Church Garden. It was re-landscaped in 2010, in conjunction with a new development just to the north. It contains a memorial to Catrin Glyndwr, additionally dedicated to the suffering of all women and children in war. There is a church mark in nearby Salters’ Hall Court.

== Burials ==
- Catrin ferch Owain Glyndŵr and three of her daughters
- Ralph Josselyn, Lord Mayor of London in 1464 and 1476

== See also ==
- List of Christopher Wren churches in London
- List of churches rebuilt after the Great Fire but since demolished
