= St Mary Bothaw =

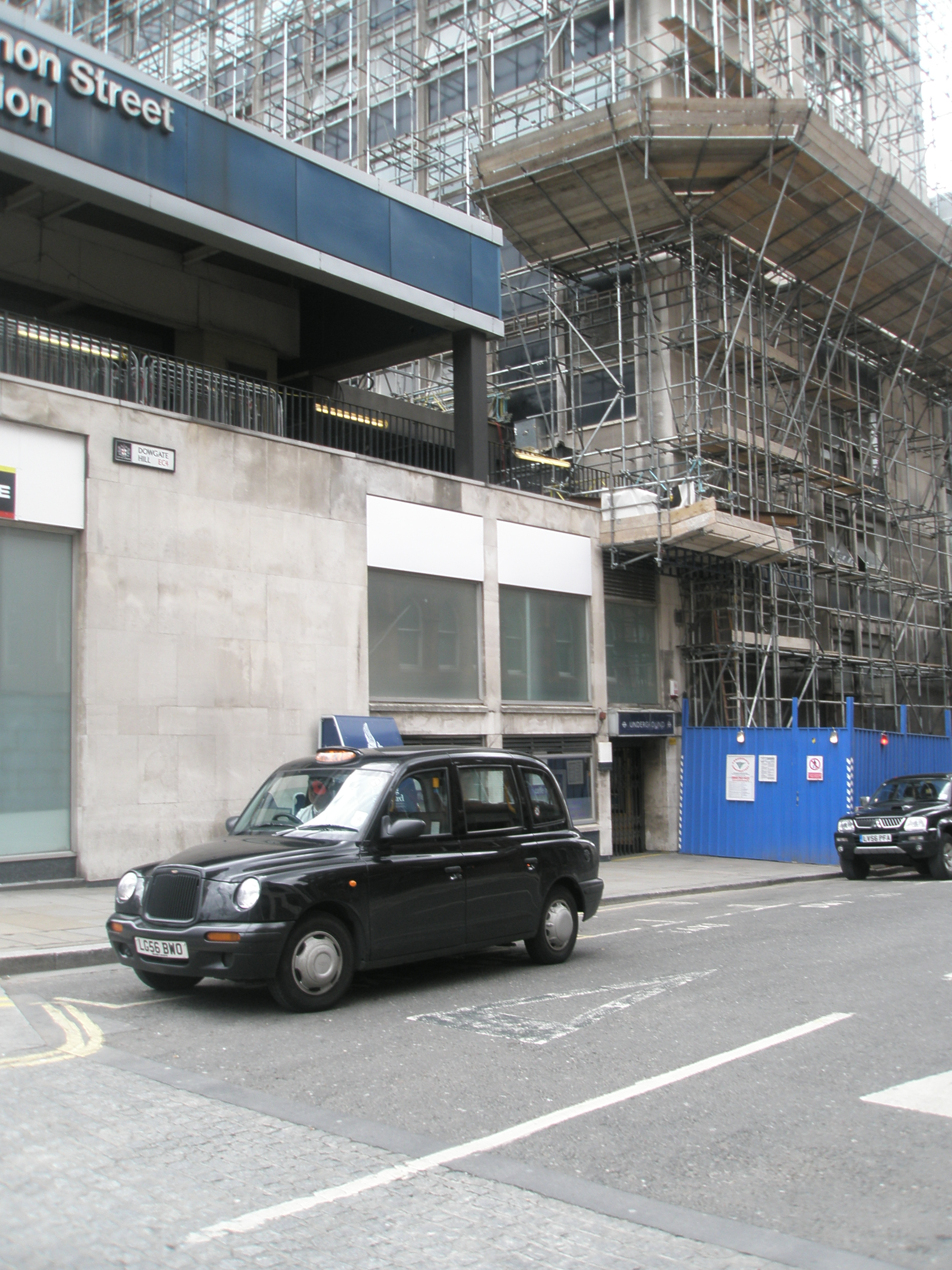
- Current photo of site
- St Mary Bothaw
- Location: Corner of Cannon Street and Dowgate Hill London
- Country: England
- Denomination: Anglican, originally Roman Catholic

History
- Founded: 10th century

Architecture
- Demolished: 1666

St Mary Bothaw (or Saint Mary Boatehaw by the Erber) was a parish church in the Walbrook ward of the City of London. It was destroyed in the Great Fire of London in 1666 and not rebuilt. However, some of its materials were used in the rebuilding of St Swithin, London Stone, with which parish it was merged.

== Location ==
The church stood in the Walbrook ward, in a narrow lane just to the south of Candlewick Street (now Cannon Street).

== History ==
St Mary Bothaw was described by John Stow as a "proper parish church"; he also suggested that "Bothaw" was probably derived from "boat-haw", meaning "boatyard".

Robert Chichele, Lord Mayor of London, in 1422, was buried in the church. A stained glass window in St Mary's is recorded as showing the arms of Henry Fitz-Ailwin de Londonestone, the first Lord Mayor of London, and according to some sources his tomb was also in the church. Stow, however, said that he was buried at the priory of the Holy Trinity in Aldgate.

== Destruction ==
Along with the majority of parish churches in the city, St Mary Bothaw was destroyed by the Great Fire of London in 1666. A Rebuilding Act was passed in 1670 and a committee set up under Sir Christopher Wren to decide which would be rebuilt; St Mary Bothaw was not amongst them. Instead the parish was united to that of St Swithin, London Stone, and some of the materials from St Mary's were used to rebuild that church. The site was retained as a churchyard until the Cannon Street Railway Station was built over it in the nineteenth century.

== Sources ==
- Seymour, Robert (1733). A Survey of the Cities of London and Westminster, Borough of Southwark, and Parts Adjacent. Vol. 1. London: T. Read.

51°30′36″N 0°5′20″W
