= St George Botolph Lane =

Coordinates: 51°30′38″N 0°5′7″W

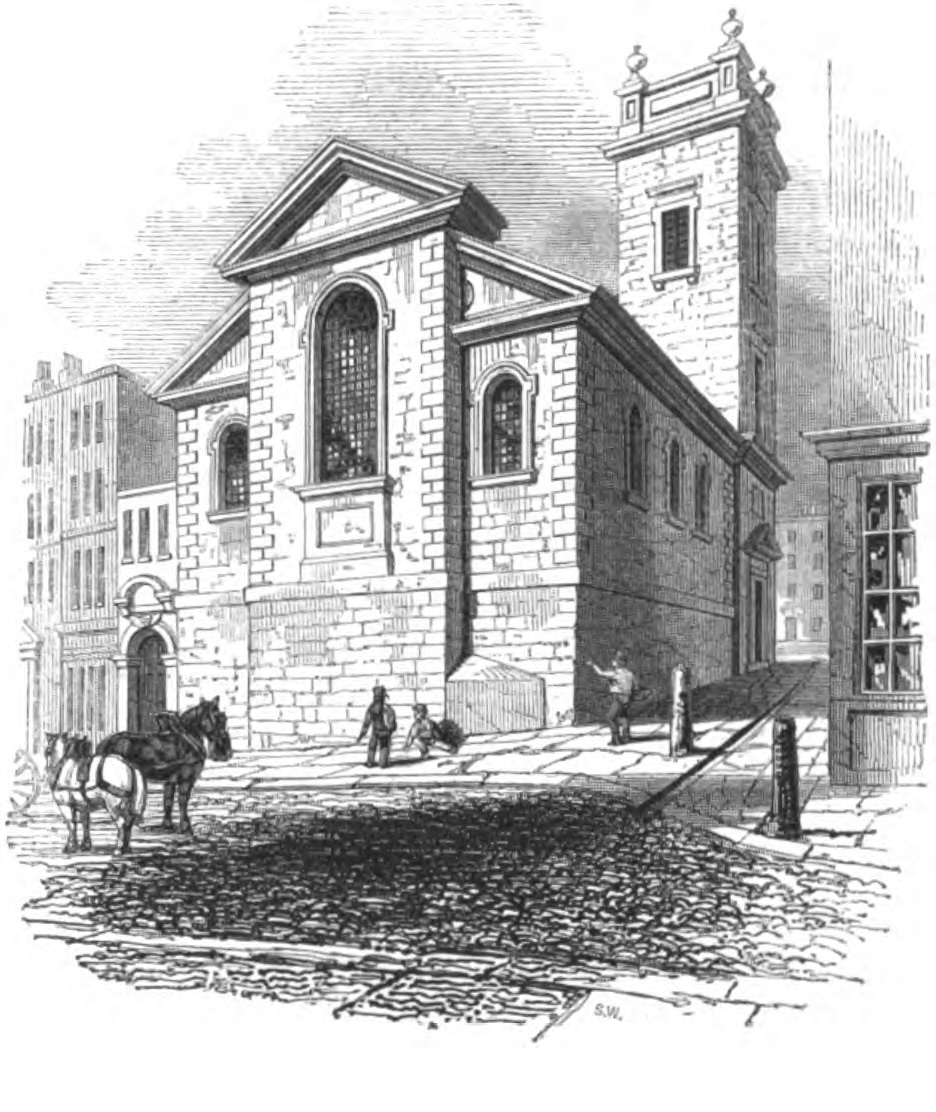
- St George Botolph Lane
- Location: London
- Country: England
- Denomination: Church of England

History
- Founded: 13th century

Architecture
- Architect: Christopher Wren
- Style: Baroque
- Closed: 1890
- Demolished: 1904

St George Botolph Lane was a church off Eastcheap, in the ward of Billingsgate in the City of London. The rear of the church overlooked Pudding Lane, where the fire of London started. It was first recorded in the twelfth century, and destroyed in the Great Fire of 1666. It was one of the 51 churches rebuilt by the office of Sir Christopher Wren. The church was demolished in 1904.

== History ==
St George Botolph Lane was the only church in the City of London dedicated to St George of Cappadocia, the patron saint of England. St Botolph was the Anglo-Saxon patron saint of travellers, consequently churches dedicated to him were usually built at city gates. There still three churches in the City of London dedicated to St Botolph (none by Wren)—St Botolph's Aldgate, St Botolph Aldersgate and St Botolph-without-Bishopsgate. Botolph Lane, on which St George's stood, was named after a fourth—St Botolph Billingsgate, which was destroyed in the Great Fire of London in 1666 and not rebuilt.

The earliest surviving reference to St George's is in a deed dated 1180, as "St. George's in Estehepe". Other early records refer to the church as "S. George the Martyr near Estchep," "St. George Buttolph" and "Seynt George in Podynge lane". The church underwent renovation in 1360 and 1627. According to John Stow, writing during the reign of Elizabeth I, the church had escaped the depredations of Tudor looting since its monuments "were well preserved from spoil".

Adam Bamme, the mayor of London who died in office on 6 June 1397 (and from whom Richard Whittington took over), was buried in St George Botolph Lane.

== Rebuilding after the Great Fire ==
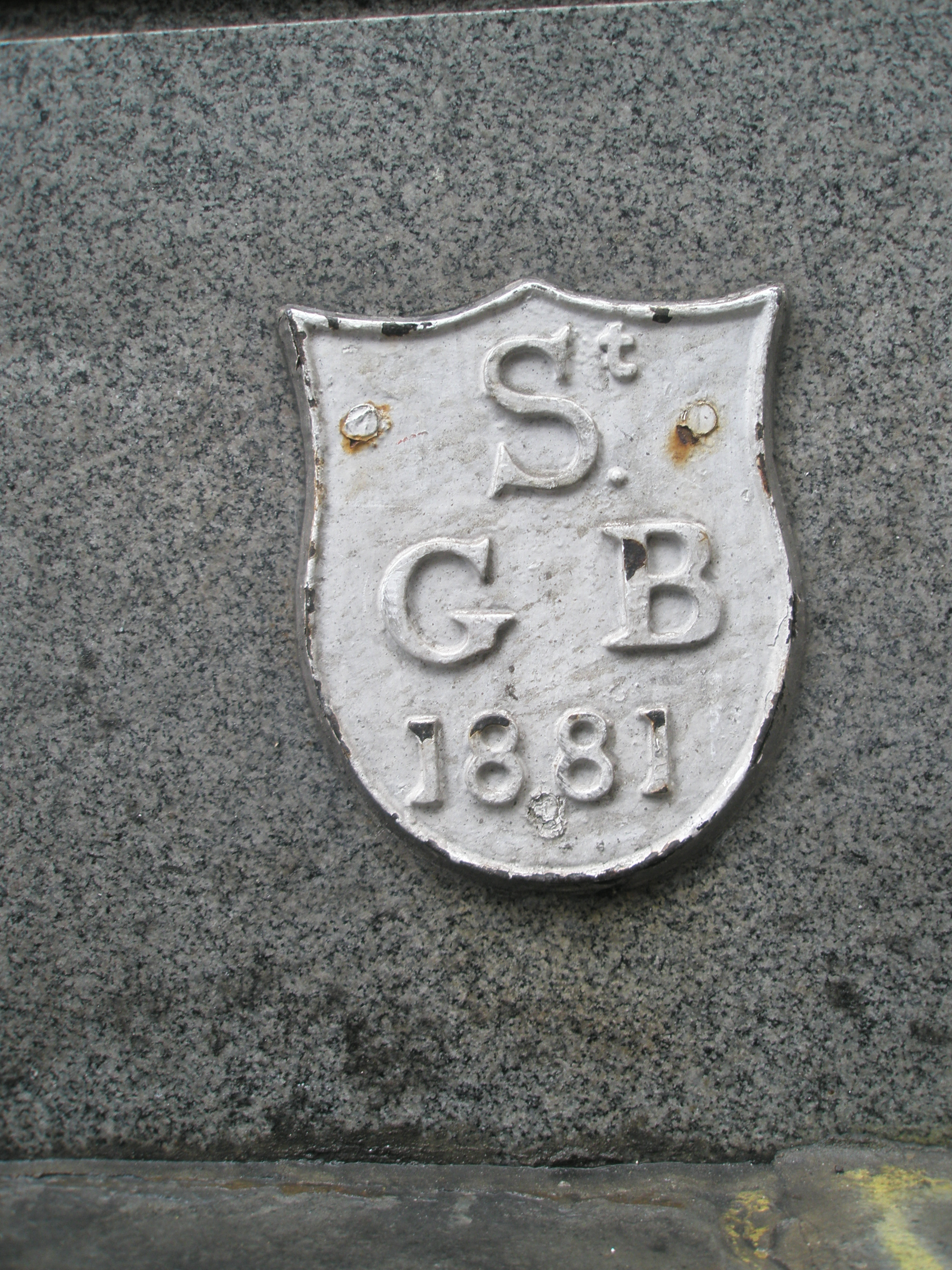
Parish boundary marker, set in a wall on Fish Street Hill

After the fire, the parish was combined with that of St Botolph Billingsgate. Rebuilding commenced in 1671, using rubble from old St Paul's Cathedral. Stone was recovered from St Botolph's for use in the walls. It was finished in 1676, at a cost of £4,466. An unusual feature of the church was that it was built on a stylobate; the site was originally low-lying and sloped downhill towards the Thames, so Wren raised the level and made it even by the construction of a platform. The new building was roughly square in plan. Its east front, facing Botolph Lane, consisted of three bays, the central one of which projected, and was slightly wider. The windows on the north and east sides were round-headed, and the church had Portland stone dressings. The square tower was accommodated within the north west of the church. It had square belfry windows and was topped with a parapet with flaming urns on the corners.

The new church measured internally 54 feet (16 m) long and 36 feet (11 m) wide. Nave and aisles were separated by two widely spaced Composite columns on each side. The nave had an arched ceiling, divided into panels and pierced by four circular windows; there were also large windows in each wall. The ceilings of the aisles were flat. There was an oak reredos, and the walls were panelled to the height of about 9 feet (2.7 m).

== Later history ==
The most famous character associated with the church was Lord Mayor and MP for the City of London, William Beckford (father of the writer and constructor of follies William Thomas Beckford). The sword rest used during his 1770 mayoral visit has the inscription "Sacred to the memory of that real patriot the Right Hon. William Beckford, twice Lord Mayor of London: whose incessant spirited efforts to serve his country hastened his dissolution." It is now in St Mary-at-Hill.

The church's proximity to Billingsgate fish market prompted James Peller Malcolm to write "The narrow streets and alleys and their wet slippery footways will not bear description or invite unnecessary visits". St George's fell into decay during the second half of the 19th century. The last service was held in 1890, and in May 1900 a letter to The Times reported that not only had the church been condemned as structurally unsafe, but that the accumulation of human remains in the vault had become a health hazard. The church was closed in 1901 and demolished in 1904, the parish being combined with that of nearby St Mary-at-Hill. Many bodies were disinterred from the churchyard and reburied at Brookwood Cemetery. The site of the church is now occupied by Richard Seifert’s Farryner House of 1973. The churchyard gates survive in Lovat Lane, and a parish boundary mark can still be found on Fish Street Hill.

The church's sword rests, plate, royal arms, ironwork, organ and organ case all went to St Mary-at-Hill. The pulpit is now in St George's church in Southall in West London.

== See also ==
- List of Christopher Wren churches in London
- List of churches rebuilt after the Great Fire but since demolished
