= Statue of William IV =

Statue in London, England

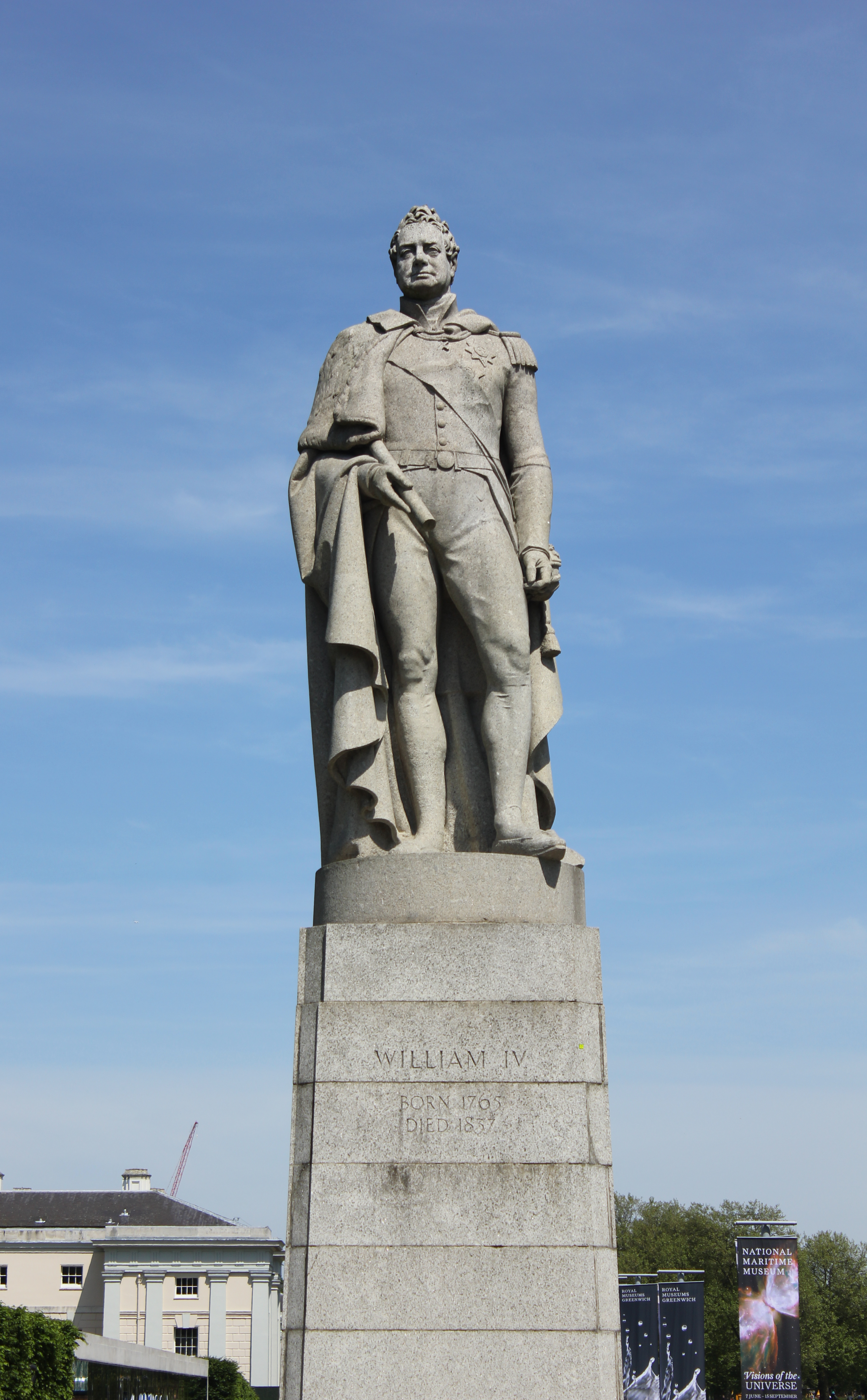
- Artist: Samuel Nixon
- Year: 1844
- Medium: Sculpture
- Location: King William Walk, Greenwich

The Statue of William IV is an 1844 sculpture by the English artist Samuel Nixon depicting King William IV of the United Kingdom. Since 1936 it has stood in King William Walk in Greenwich having been shifted from an earlier location in Central London.

William IV reigned from 1830 to 1837 and was succeeded by his niece the Queen Victoria. The Corporation of the City of London voted the funds to erect a monument in his memory. It was originally located in the recently constructed King William Street in the City of London, raised on a high plinth on the former site of the Boar's Head Inn. The former king is shown wearing the uniform of an admiral, in acknowledgement of his previous service in the Royal Navy. It was one of the first statues to be created using granite.

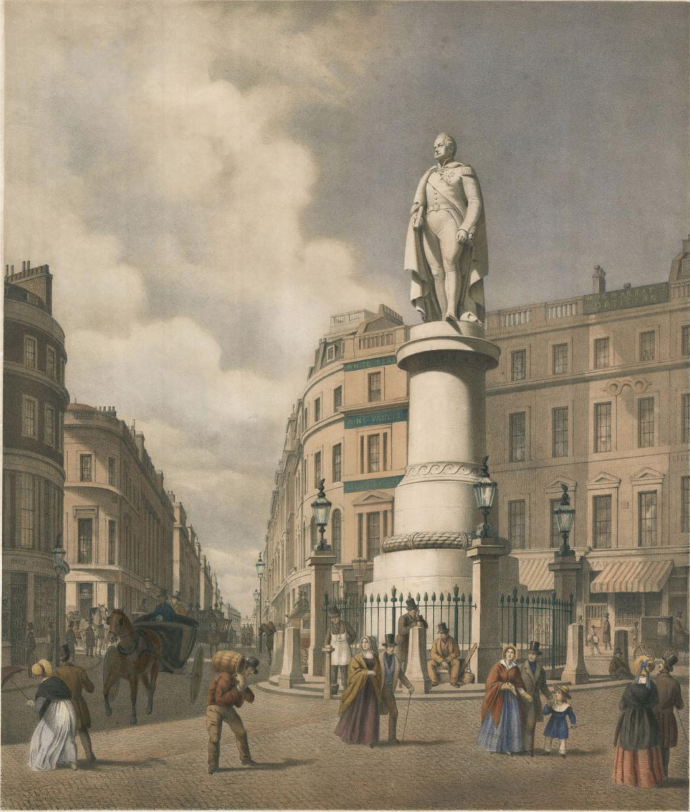
The statue at its original site in the City of London in the 1840s.

By the mid-1930s the increasing motor traffic meant that William's statue was adding to delays and the City was looking to redevelop the site. It was agreed that the statue should be shifted to Greenwich and be placed by the site of the recently demolished St Mary's Church. It has remained there, close to the National Maritime Museum and Greenwich Park ever since. It has been Grade II listed since 1973.

== See also ==
- Equestrian statue of George IV, Trafalgar Square, a statue of William's brother and predecessor as monarch
- Statue of the Duke of Kent, a memorial to William's elder brother the Duke of Kent

== Bibliography ==
- Cavanagh, Terry. Public Sculpture of South London. Liverpool University Press, 2007.
- Saunders, Ann. Historic Views of London: Photographs from the Collection of B.E.C. Howarth-Loomes. English Heritage, 2008.
- Smith, Nicola. The Royal Image and the English People. Routledge, 2017.
- Van Der Kiste, John. William IV: The Last Hanoverian King of Britain. Pen and Sword History, 2022.
