= London Capital =

London Capital may refer to:

- London Capital Club, a private members' club, at the former Gresham clubhouse
- London Capital Credit Union, a savings and loans co-operative, based in Archway
- PAWS London Capital, a former basketball team, active 1998–2013

== See also ==
- Capital London, an independent local radio station, owned by Global Radio
- London, the capital city of England and the United Kingdom
