= Marratt and Ellis Opticians =

Marratt & Ellis Opticians was a company established in 1828 in London, England. Initially known as J S Marratt, then Marratt and Short, this optician's was situated at 63 King William Street, the northern end of London Bridge where King William Street meets Gracechurch Street. Marratt and Ellis was at one time a large business engaged in sight testing, dispensing spectacles, making artificial eyes and a supplier of optical and scientific instruments. There are many examples of opera glasses, thermometers, barometers and meteorological instruments etc. which are engraved with the company name.

The Illustrated London Progress Commerce 1893

== History ==
IN 1828 a business was established in the City of London by the oculist J S Marratt.

In 1851, Marratt participated in the Great Exhibition of 1851 at Hyde Park, and was listed as an instrument maker.

In 1859, the company was known as Marratt and Short, and one of its proprietors was Thomas W. Short. That year the premises of the company were the subject of a scientific study of the toxicity of arsenic-impregnated green wallpaper which was popularly used at the time. Marratt and Short in 1862 also helped to develop an improved version of the laryngoscope.

A war damaged book of the company's accounts running from October 1857 to July 1866 shows the business doing well, maintaining takings between £300 and £400 a month. During the first six months of 1862 the figures were boosted to £500 by the sale of tickets to the Crystal Palace at its new site on a hill overlooking Sydenham, SE London.

In 1866, Short, working with an inventor named George Ansell, created an alarm system which would alert miners to the infiltration of gases. Short left the partnership in 1867.

Marratt then took on another partner, George Everest Ellis. This partnership was dissolved in 1880; however, the company continued to be called Marratt and Ellis. The company developed a line of artificial eyes, and exhibited at the International Medical and Sanitary Exhibition in 1881.

Although John Symonds Marratt died in Streatham in 1889, the company continued to operate under this name for many years. There are references to the business in The Illustrated London Progress Commerce in 1893. The business was operated by John Clement Ellis; according to the "Optician" Centenary Supplement 1991 stated that Mr J Ellis was considered a pioneer in sight-testing methods.

In 1914 G. E. Ellis was still connected with the company; he also represented the ward of Warwick on the Common Council of the City of London.

In May 1941, during World War Two, the premises suffered total destruction when a high explosive bomb landed nearby. The business reopened in various addresses in the City (Arthur Street, Eastcheap and Great Tower Street). John Clement Ellis, a batchelor, died intestate in 1952 at Wisborough Green, Sussex.

During the 1960s the business relocated to Forest Hill, SE London under the ownership of Wallis Cupit, at 14 Dartmouth Road. A letter from the manager of Westminster Bank Lombard Street dated 1961 invited the owner to lunch as their records show that Marratt and Ellis had held an account there for 84 years and they had never met.

Chris Watts took over the practice in 1974 and moved the business in 1994 to 50 London Road.

In 2007 the business was acquired by Johann Blandford and Alnoor Kassam and the name changed to Kassford Opticians. This was an amalgamation of their surnames. Johann and Alnoor still run the practice to this day at the 50 London Road address. Their company, Kassford Opticians Limited, was dissolved in 2021 and the business acquired as a branch by London Eye Care Centre of West Norwood. Alnoor continued to be associated with the Forest Hill branch until 2026.

== Photographs ==
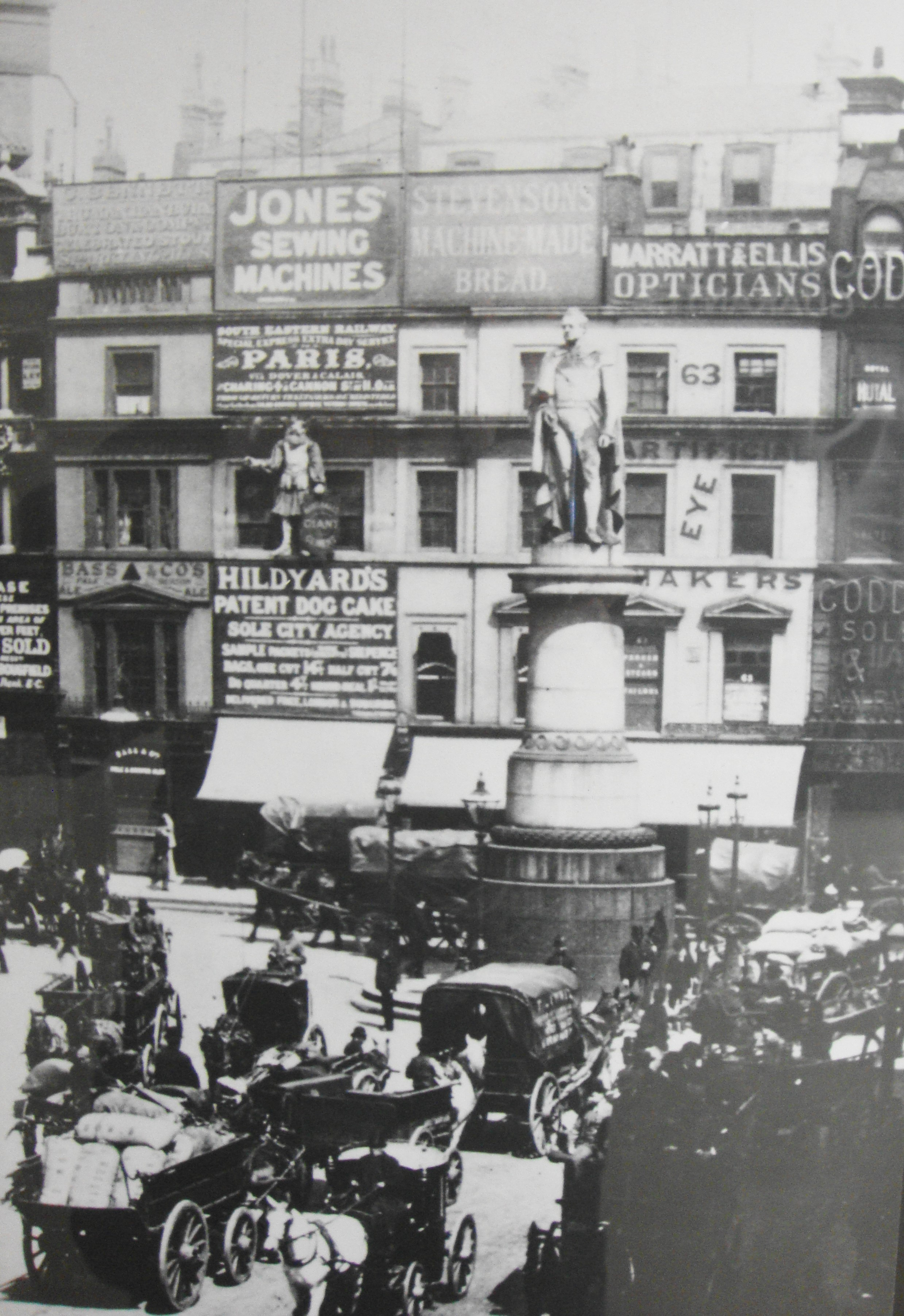
King William Street 1890 Permission PamlinPictures.co.uk

In 1844, a granite statue of King William IV, sculpted by Samuel Nixon, was erected at the intersection to the memory of the Sailor King. During this period, pictorial records of the statue, with the opticians directly behind, show how the area developed from the 1830s to the 1940s and prints and later photographs, show the changing life, and transport from hand carts to horse-drawn carriages, trolley buses and finally motor vehicles. These prints of the original engravings can be seen at the British Library, and many photos are in the Francis Frith Collection. The statue was moved to Greenwich Park in 1935.
