= White Hart, Bishopsgate =

Former pub in London, England

Coordinates: 51.5168°N 0.0811°W

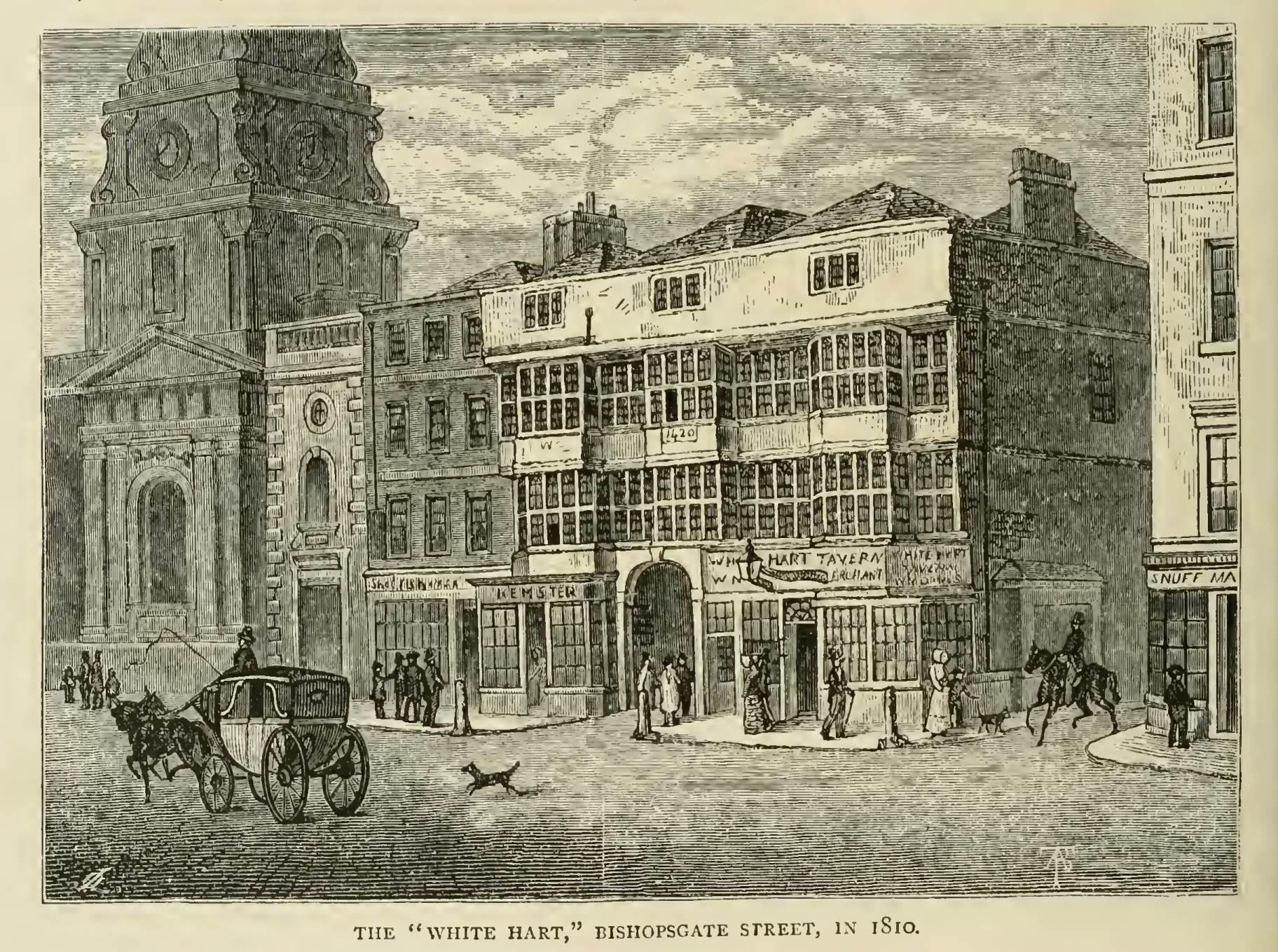
The White Hart, 1810

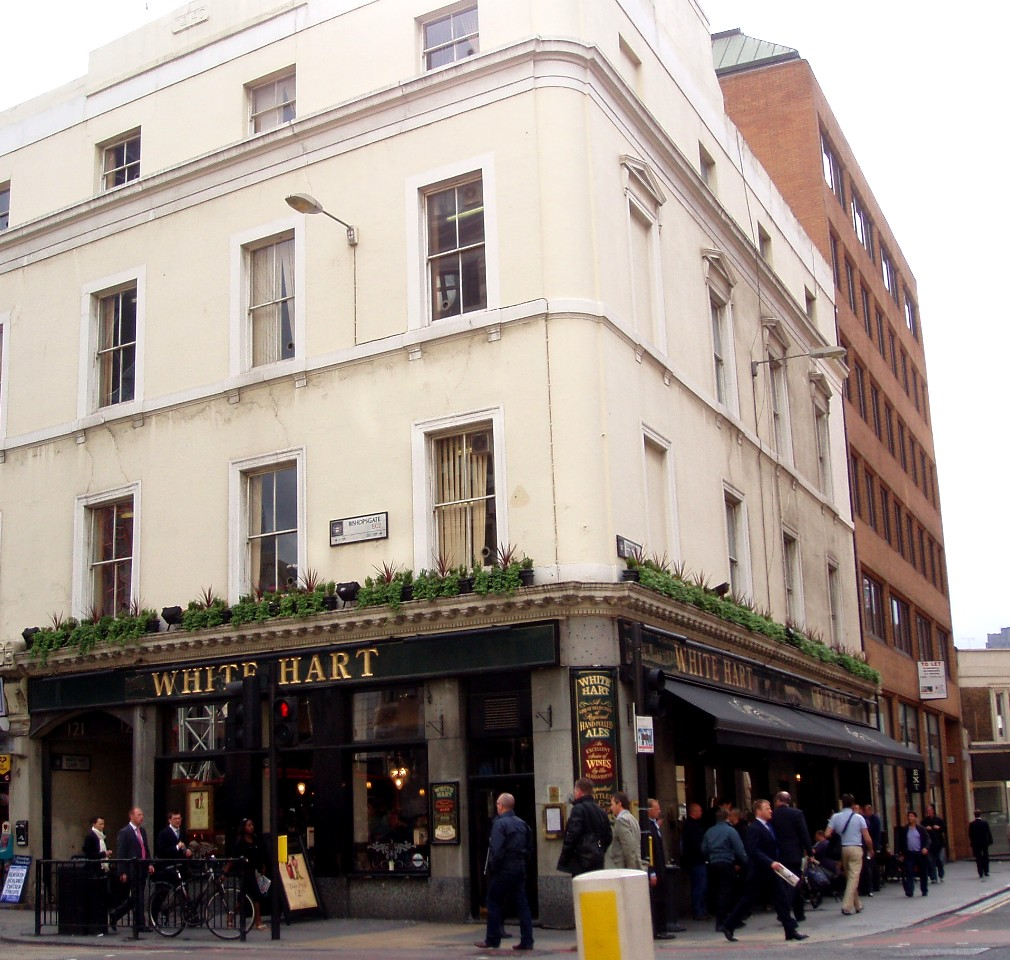
The White Hart, 2008

The White Hart is a former pub at 121 Bishopsgate, London.

The librarian at the Bishopsgate Institute, Charles Goss, wrote a history of the White Hart in 1930, and believed that it dated back to 1246. Samuel Nixon (sculptor) had his workshop at The White Hart (1838–1854).

It certainly existed as The White Hart in 1377. However, it was rebuilt in 1480 and 1829. It closed in 2014, and its facade was integrated into a nine-storey office block.
