= King William Walk =

Street in Greenwich, London

Coordinates: 51.48050°N 0.00889°W

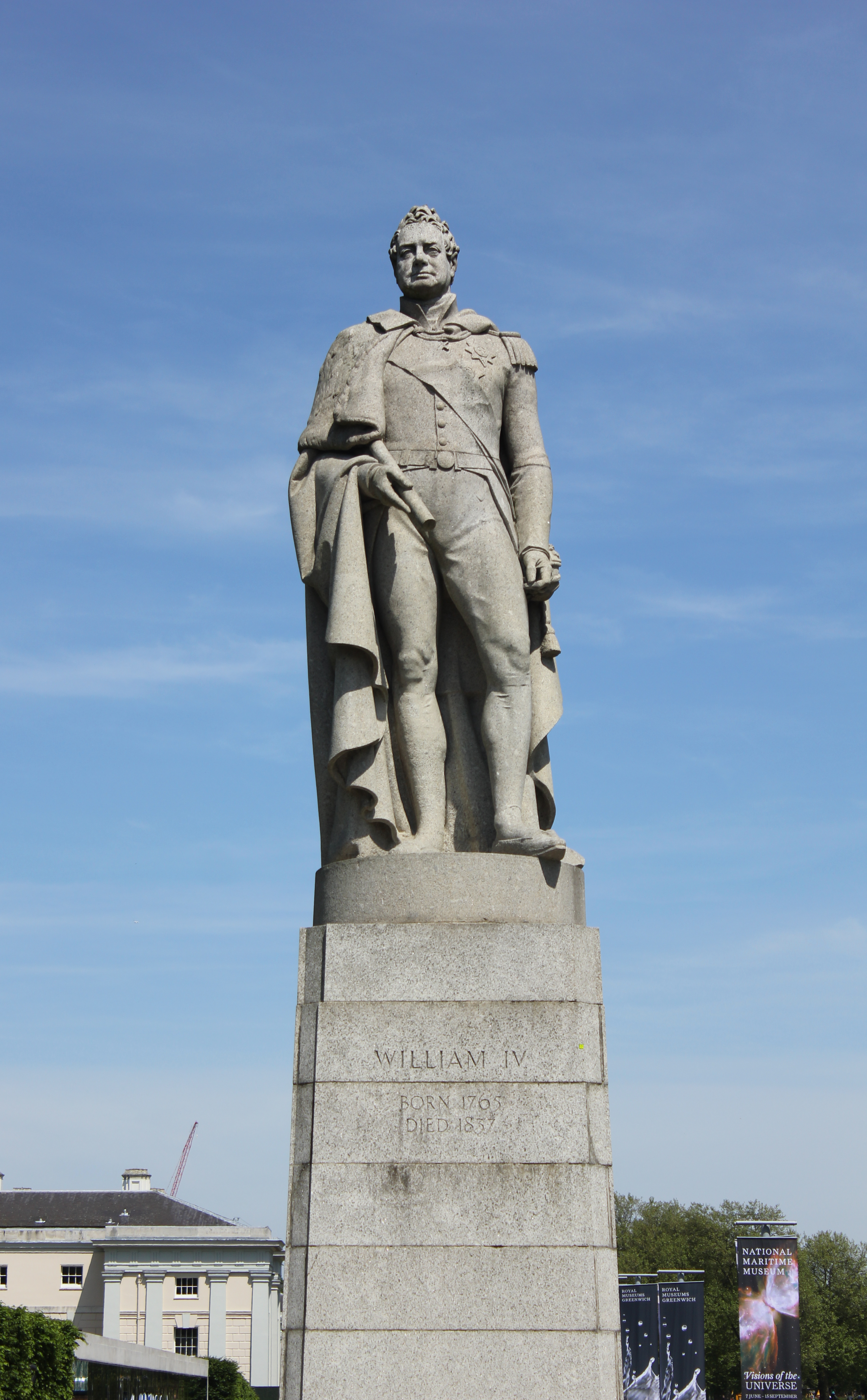
Statue of William IV, relocated from the City of London in the 1930s.

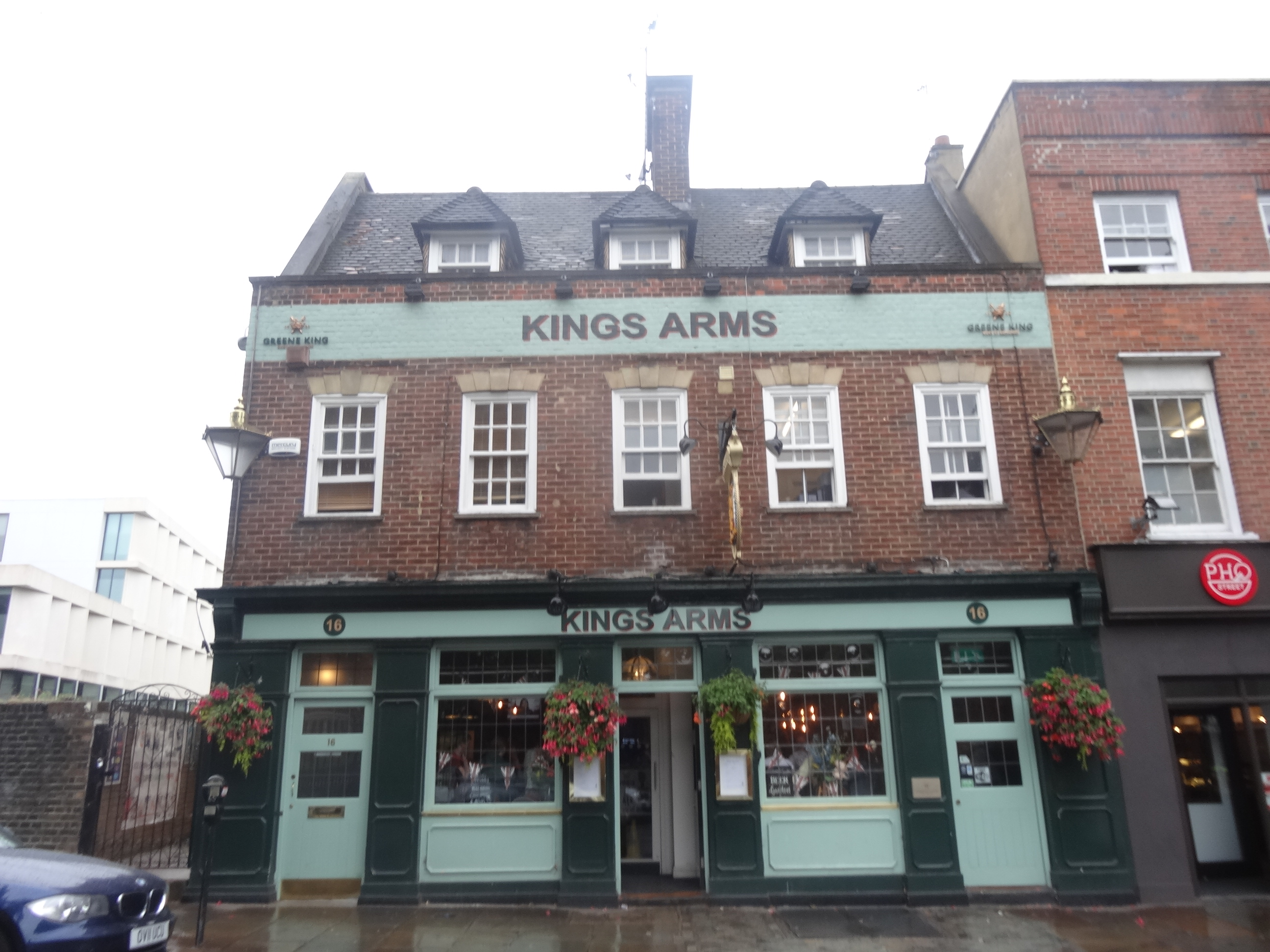
The King's Arms pub on King William Walk.

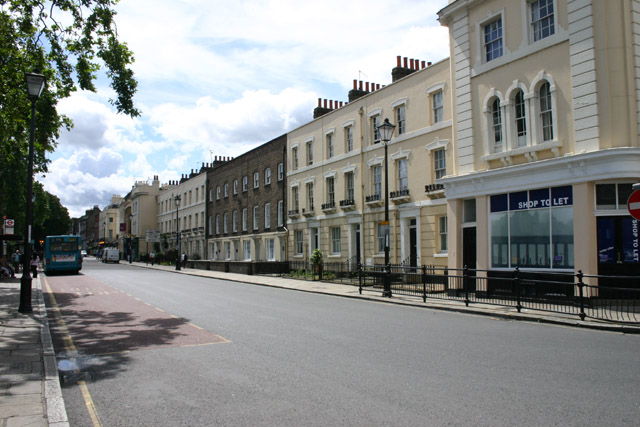
Houses on King William Walk.

King William Walk is a street in central Greenwich in London. It runs northwards from the entrance to Greenwich Park along the edge of the Old Royal Naval College to the Cutty Sark and the nearby Greenwich foot tunnel. The western side of the street comprises a mixture of residential and commercial properties, with several shops, restaurants and, south of Nelson Road, two pubs. The eastern side includes the Discover Greenwich Visitor Centre and several former College buildings and open spaces today used by the University of Greenwich, including residential accommodation in Devonport House, south of Nelson Road.

The street was originally part of the Medieval centre of Greenwich and was known as Friars Road after a pre-Reformation Franciscan friary built to the west of the Palace of Placentia. The street was known during the eighteenth century as King Street, but was partly redeveloped and extended during the 1820s when central Greenwich was rebuilt. This process also saw the construction of Nelson Road (1829) and College Approach (1836) and the establishment of a new Greenwich Market.

The street contains several surviving eighteenth century buildings. At the northern end is the statue of Statue of William IV, which was created by Samuel Nixon. Originally it stood in King William Street in the City of London but was relocated to Greenwich in 1935. It stands where St Mary's Church, designed by George Basevi, was located from 1823 to 1935. At the southern end, by the Greenwich Tavern pub, King William Walk is joined by the short Nevada Street; from Nevada Street's western end, Croom's Hill runs southwards up the west side of Greenwich Park towards Blackheath, London.

== Bibliography ==
- Cherry, Bridget & Pevsner, Nikolaus. London 2: South. Yale University Press, 2002.
- Humphreys, Rob. The Rough Guide to London. Rough Guides, 2003.
- Ramzan, David C. Greenwich Reflections. Amberley Publishing Limited, 2021.
- Richardson, Albert E. Monumental Classic Architecture in Great Britain and Ireland. Courier Corporation, 2001.
