= Boar's Head Inn, Eastcheap =

Boar's Head Inn
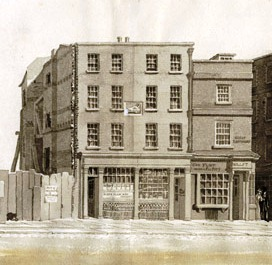
- The Boar's Head Inn in 1829, shortly before demolition. The original Boar's Head sign is in the centre of the building, which was no longer an inn. On the ground floor are a perfume shop and a hat shop.

- Location within City of London

General information
- Type: Public house
- Location: Eastcheap, City of London
- Coordinates: 51°30′39″N 0°05′12″W
- Opened: before 1537
- Demolished: 1831; 195 years ago

The Boar's Head Inn was a tavern in Eastcheap in the City of London which is supposed to be the meeting place of Sir John Falstaff, Prince Hal and other characters in Shakespeare's Henry IV plays.

== Historical basis ==
The Boar's Head Tavern is featured in historical plays by Shakespeare, particularly Henry IV, Part 1, as a favourite resort of the fictional character Falstaff and his friends in the early 15th century. The landlady is Mistress Quickly. It was the subject of essays by Oliver Goldsmith and Washington Irving. Though there is no evidence of a Boar's Head inn existing at the time the play is set, Shakespeare was referring to a real inn that existed in his own day. Established before 1537, but destroyed in 1666 in the Great Fire of London, it was soon rebuilt and continued operation until some point in the late 18th century, when the building was used by retail outlets. What remained of the building was demolished in 1831. The boar's head sign was kept, and is now installed in the Shakespeare's Globe theatre.

== Neo-Gothic building ==
The site of the original inn is now part of the approach to London Bridge in Cannon Street. From 1844 to 1935 the Statue of William IV stood on the location of the former inn, before being moved to Greenwich. Near the site, at 33–35 Eastcheap, the architect Robert Lewis Roumieu created a neo-Gothic building in 1868; this makes references to the Boar's Head Inn in its design and exterior decorations, which include a boar's head peeping out from grass, and portrait heads of Henry IV and Henry V. Roumieu's building originally functioned as a vinegar warehouse, though it has since been converted into offices. Nikolaus Pevsner described it as "one of the maddest displays in London of gabled Gothic brick". Ian Nairn called it "the scream you wake on at the end of a nightmare".

== Depiction by Washington Irving ==
Washington Irving, in his The Sketch Book of Geoffrey Crayon, Gent., wrote "The Boar's Head Tavern East Cheap," as a detective story of sorts, in which the author attempts to locate the real-life tavern of Shakespeare's Falstaff.

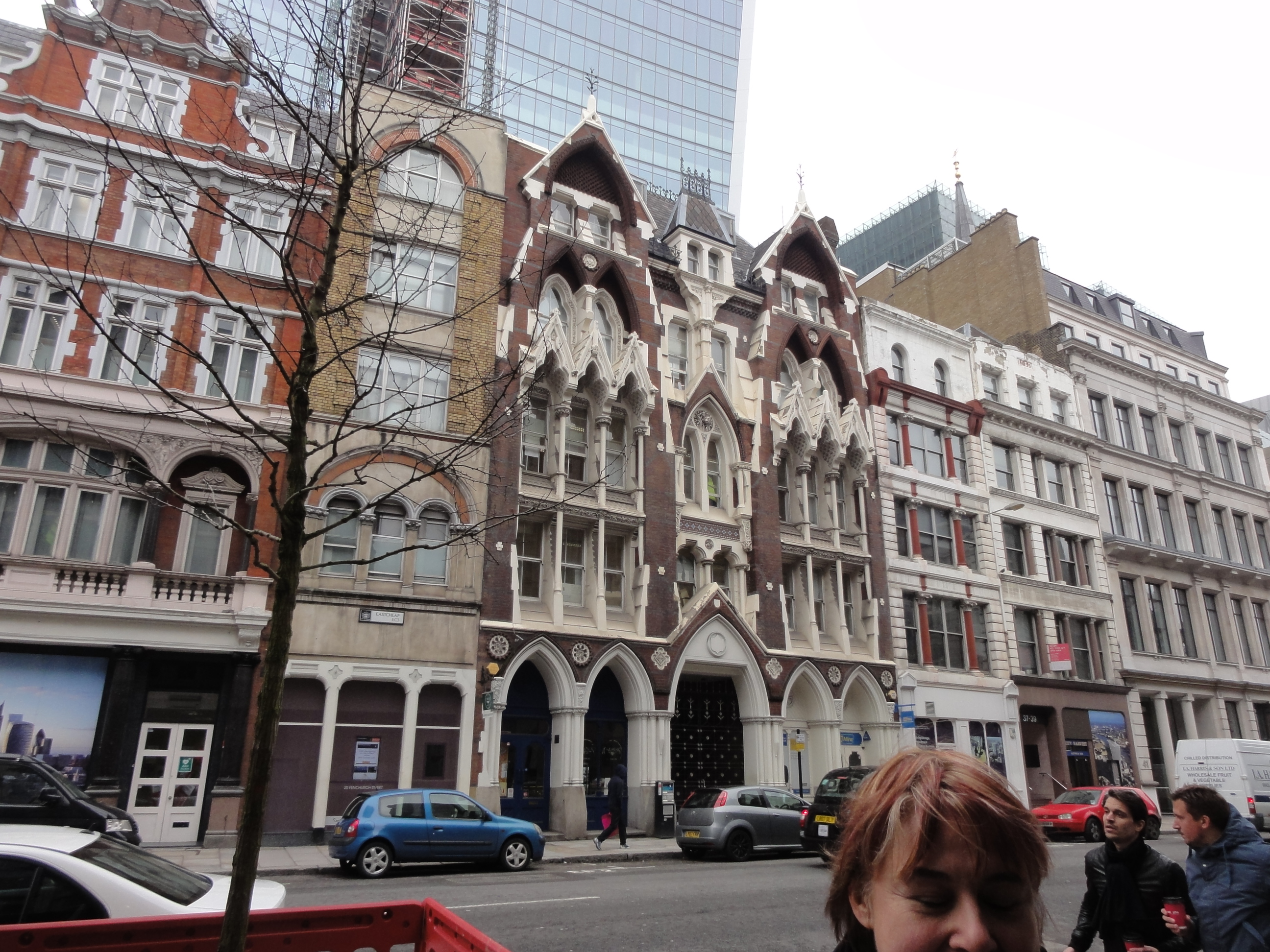
The 1868 building near the site, with architectural references to the inn.

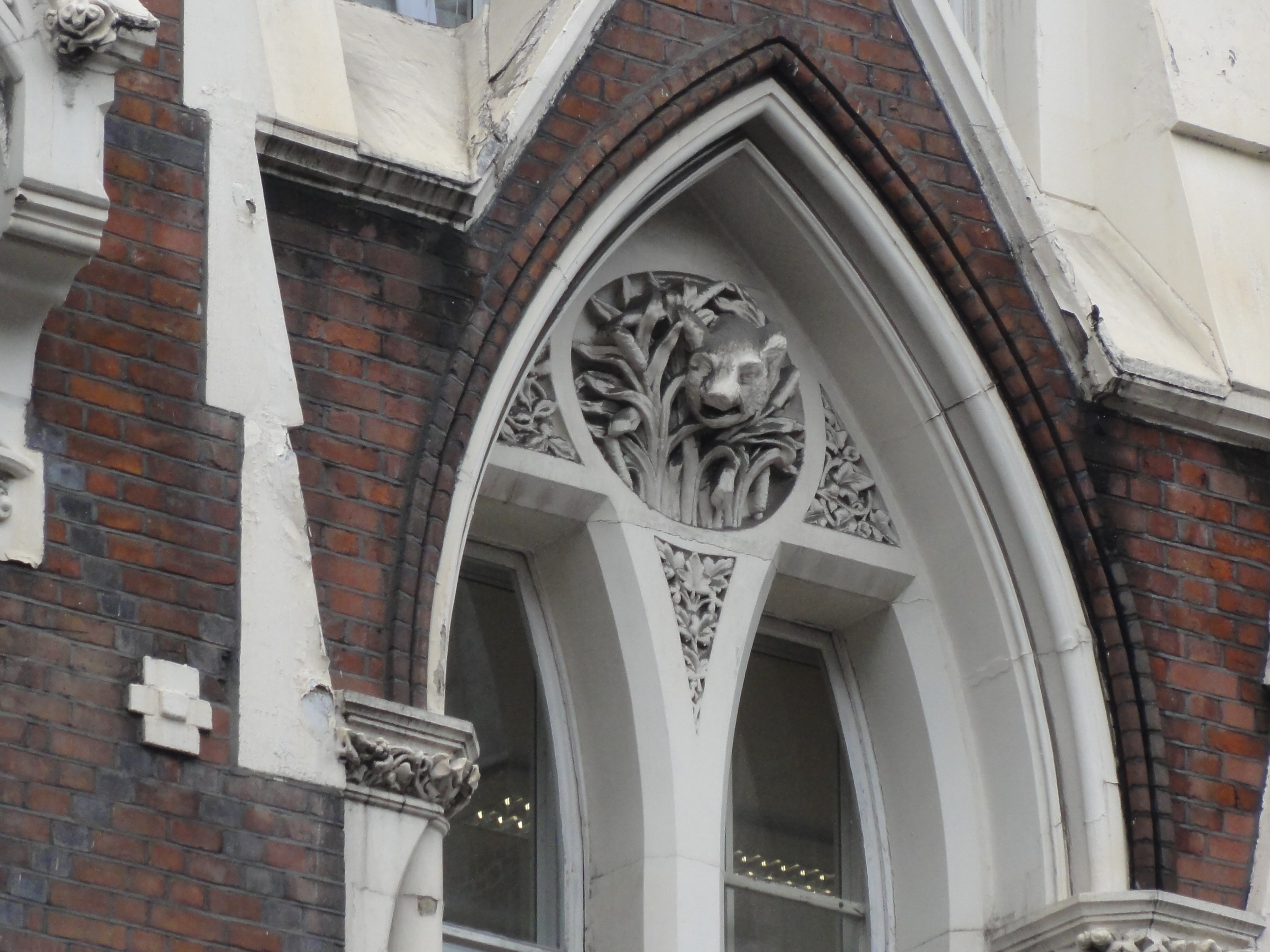
Close up, showing boar's head decoration

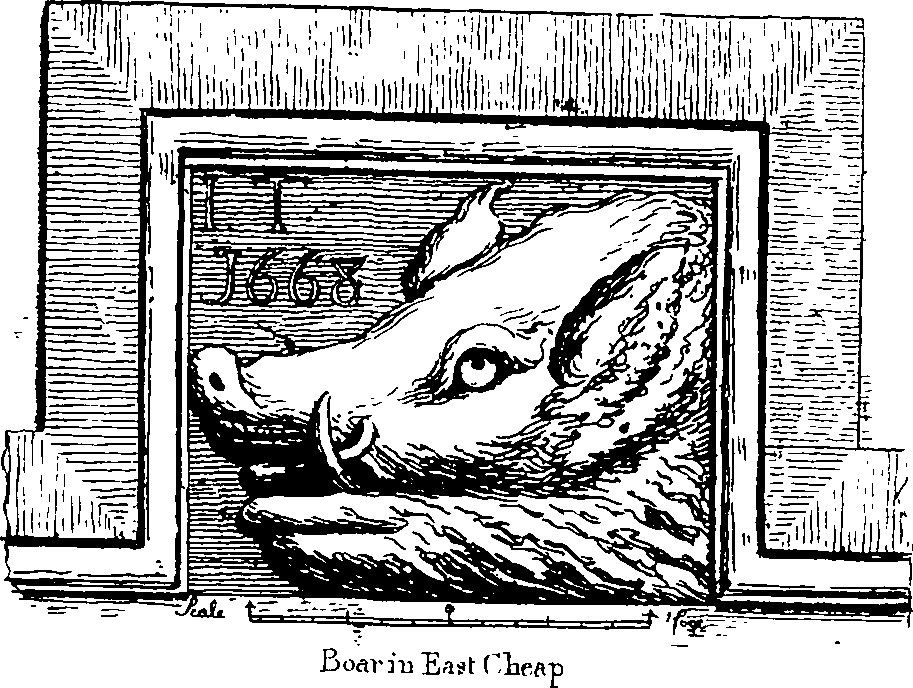
The old sign of the Boar's Head

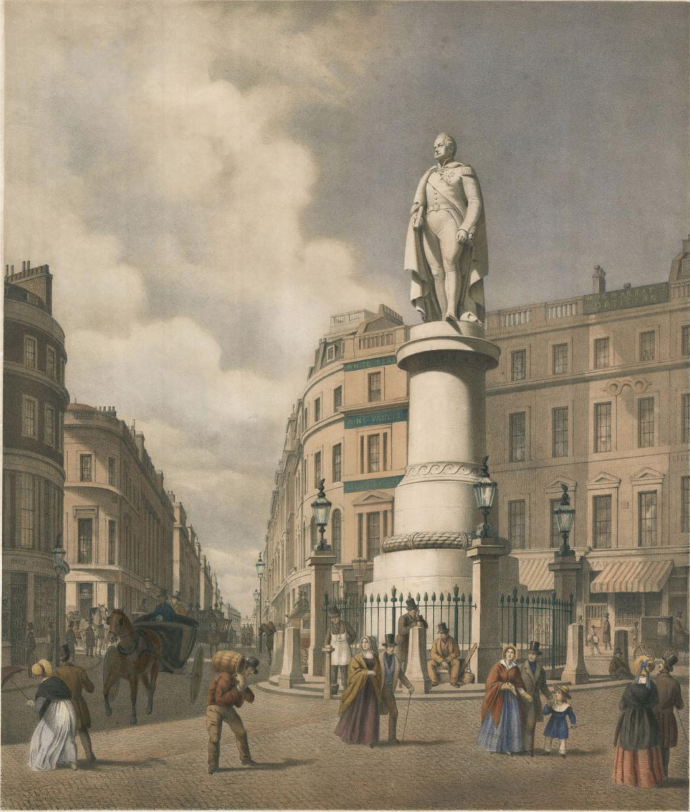
Former location of the inn in 1844, replaced by the Statue of William IV.
