= Eastcheap =

Street in the City of London

Coordinates: 51°30′39″N 0°5′10″W

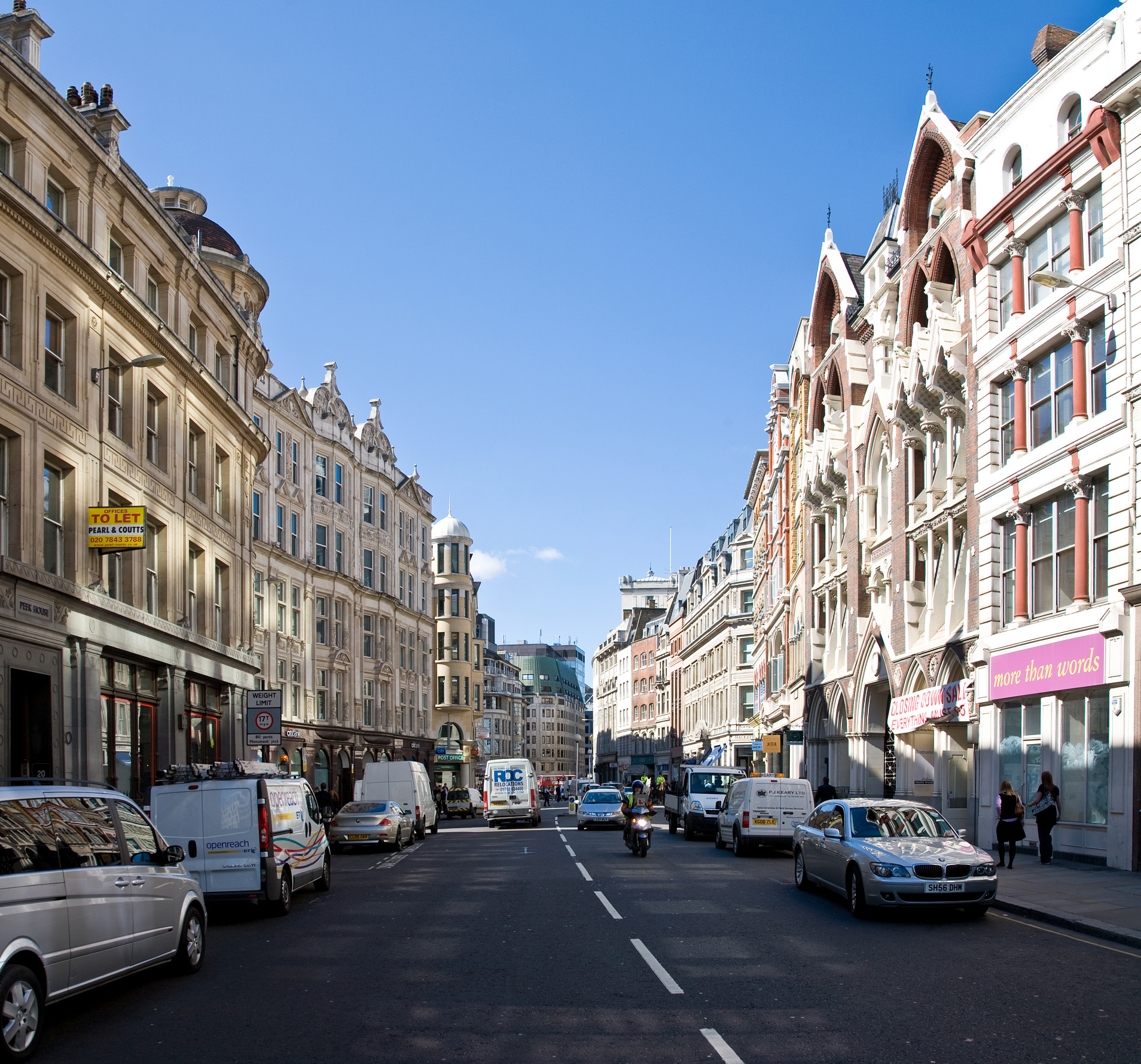
- Eastcheap in 2007, looking west towards Monument. The building with the two gables on the right is the Victorian Gothic 33-35 Eastcheap.
- Interactive map of Eastcheap
- Length: 0.2 mi (0.32 km)
- Location: London, United Kingdom
- Postal code: EC3
- Nearest Tube station: Monument
- East end: Great Tower Street
- West end: King William Street

Eastcheap is a street in central London that is a western continuation of Great Tower Street towards Monument junction. Its name derives from cheap, the Old English word for market, with the prefix 'East' distinguishing it from Westcheap, another former market street that today is called Cheapside.

In medieval times, Eastcheap was the main meat market in the City of London, with butchers' stalls lining both sides of the street. It is also notable as the former location of Falstaff's Boar's Head Inn, featured in William Shakespeare's Henry IV, Part 1 and Henry IV, Part 2.

== History ==
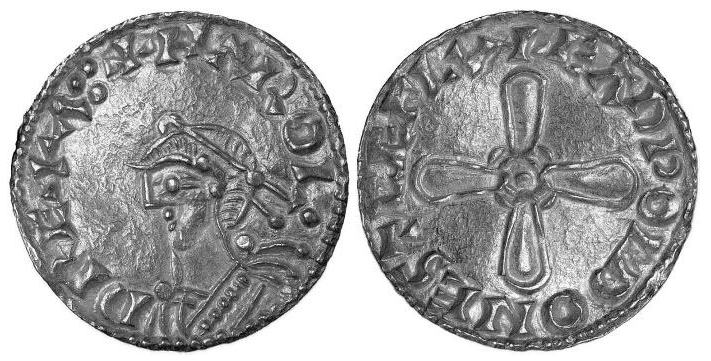
Anglo-Saxon penny minted by Eadwold in "Estcep"

The history of Eastcheap dates back to Anglo-Saxon times. The name is first attested on an Anglo-Saxon penny of King Harold I (reigned 1035–1040) that was minted in London by the moneyer Eadwold between 1035 and 1037. The mint signature on the coin reads "EADǷOLD ONESTCEPLV" which is interpreted as "Eadwold on Estcep Lu[ndene]", meaning "Eadwold, on East Cheap, London". It is believed that this is the earliest known instance of a street-name on Anglo-Saxon coinage.

At its western end, the modern Eastcheap begins at Monument junction where Gracechurch Street, Cannon Street, and King William Street converge by Monument tube station. It continues eastward into Great Tower Street. It lies within the City ward of Bridge.

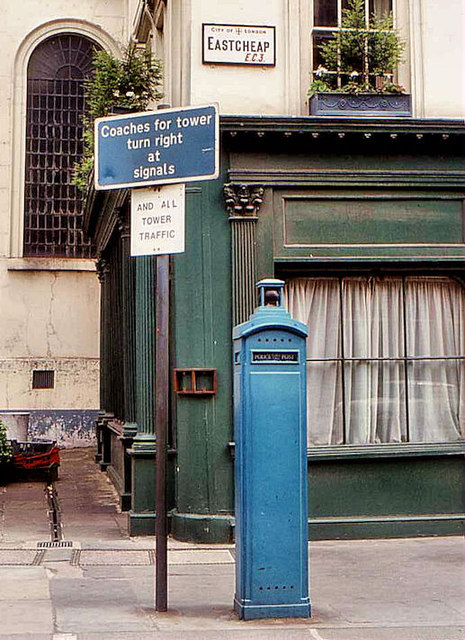
A police box on Eastcheap, 1981

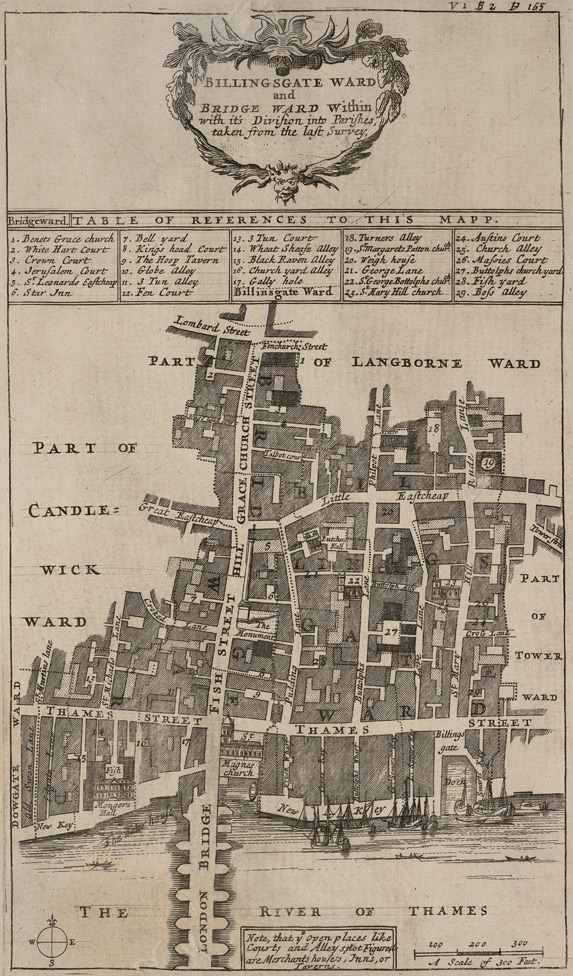
A 1720 map showing Little Eastcheap, today known simply as Eastcheap, distinguished from Great Eastcheap to the west of Gracechurch Street

The street formerly extended further to the west, where it was called Great Eastcheap, but this section was eliminated when King William Street was built to provide new access to London Bridge in the early 19th century. Falstaff's famed tavern, which stood on the Great Eastcheap section of the road, was demolished at this time. The old eastern portion and what is today's Eastcheap, was known as Little Eastcheap.

The erased western portion of Eastcheap is recalled in the name of the church of St. Clement Eastcheap, which, despite its name, is to the north of King William Street and to the west of present-day Eastcheap.

Eastcheap formed part of the marathon course of the 2012 Olympic and Paralympic Games. The women's Olympic marathon took place on 5 August and the men's on 12 August. The Paralympic marathons were held on 9 September.

== Notable structures ==
On Eastcheap's north side is St. Margaret Pattens' church at the corner with Rood Lane. All Hallows-by-the-Tower is visible looking east down Eastcheap and Great Tower Street. On the south side, in the side-road Lovat Lane, is St. Mary-at-Hill. Also on the south side is Botolph Lane, where a Christopher Wren church, St. George, Botolph Lane, stood until it was demolished in 1904. West of Botolph Lane is Pudding Lane, where the Great Fire of London was started.

At 16 Eastcheap is the Monument branch of Citibank; this was the site of St. Andrew Hubbard church, where the economist Thomas Mun was baptised, but the structure was later destroyed by the Great Fire. It was replaced by the King's Weigh House where foreign merchants were required to weigh their goods, although the law was not strictly enforced. In 1695 it became a chapel for dissenters. In 1834 they moved to larger premises in Fish Street Hill, at the western end of Eastcheap, now occupied by an exit of the modern Monument tube station. In 1891, Alfred Waterhouse built another Weigh House church, on Duke Street. The building was deemed so magnificent that nearby Robert Street was renamed Weighhouse Street in its honour. During excavation of the site the foundations had stones that had the character of Roman workmanship, and Samian pottery was discovered.

On the Philpot Lane side of the corner between Jamies at 23 Eastcheap and Cafe Nero at 13 Philpot Lane in EC3 is one of London's smallest statues, known as the "Philpot Lane Mice", the "Two Mice Eating Cheese", or "Mice and shells", of two mice fighting over either a piece of cheese (or perhaps two shells). The statue's exact origin is unclear, but the primary theory is that there were two construction workers working on either the Monument to the Great Fire of London, about 400 ft away, completed in 1677, or 23 Eastcheap itself, the office of spice merchants Hunt and Crombie, architected by John Young and Son, and constructed by Piper and Wheeler, completed in 1862, were sitting on a rail high up on the scaffolding eating lunch; one of them noticed that their cheese sandwich was mostly eaten, and blamed the other, who denied the allegation, so they got into a fight, and either they slipped or the rail broke, and both fell to their deaths. Other workers later figured out that some mice had stolen the sandwich, and decided to make the statue to commemorate the tragedy. Two more theories are that a nearby merchant was paid a fortune by an Asian king to bring Richard Whittington's cat to chase away mice, or that a young worker was fired without getting paid, and decided to get revenge by sneaking in and symbolizing his former bosses as rats. Another theory is that it was where the Black Death (which was carried by rats/mice) was first discovered. Another theory is that it is the builder's emblem, as there were previously other buildings in the City of London with mouse carvings.

The building at 33-35 Eastcheap is a notable example of Victorian Gothic architecture.
