= St Mary's Church, Greenwich =

Historic church in Greenwich, London

Coordinates: 51.4799°N 0.0065°W

St Mary's in the 19th century.

St Mary's Church, Greenwich was a church that once stood on King William Walk in central Greenwich in London between 1823 and 1935. As Greenwich's population expanded in the early nineteenth century, there was a need for a second Anglican church in Greenwich to support the existing parish church at St Alfege Church, Greenwich. St Alfege was rebuilt in the 1710s by Nicholas Hawksmoor, but had been the site of a church since the medieval era.

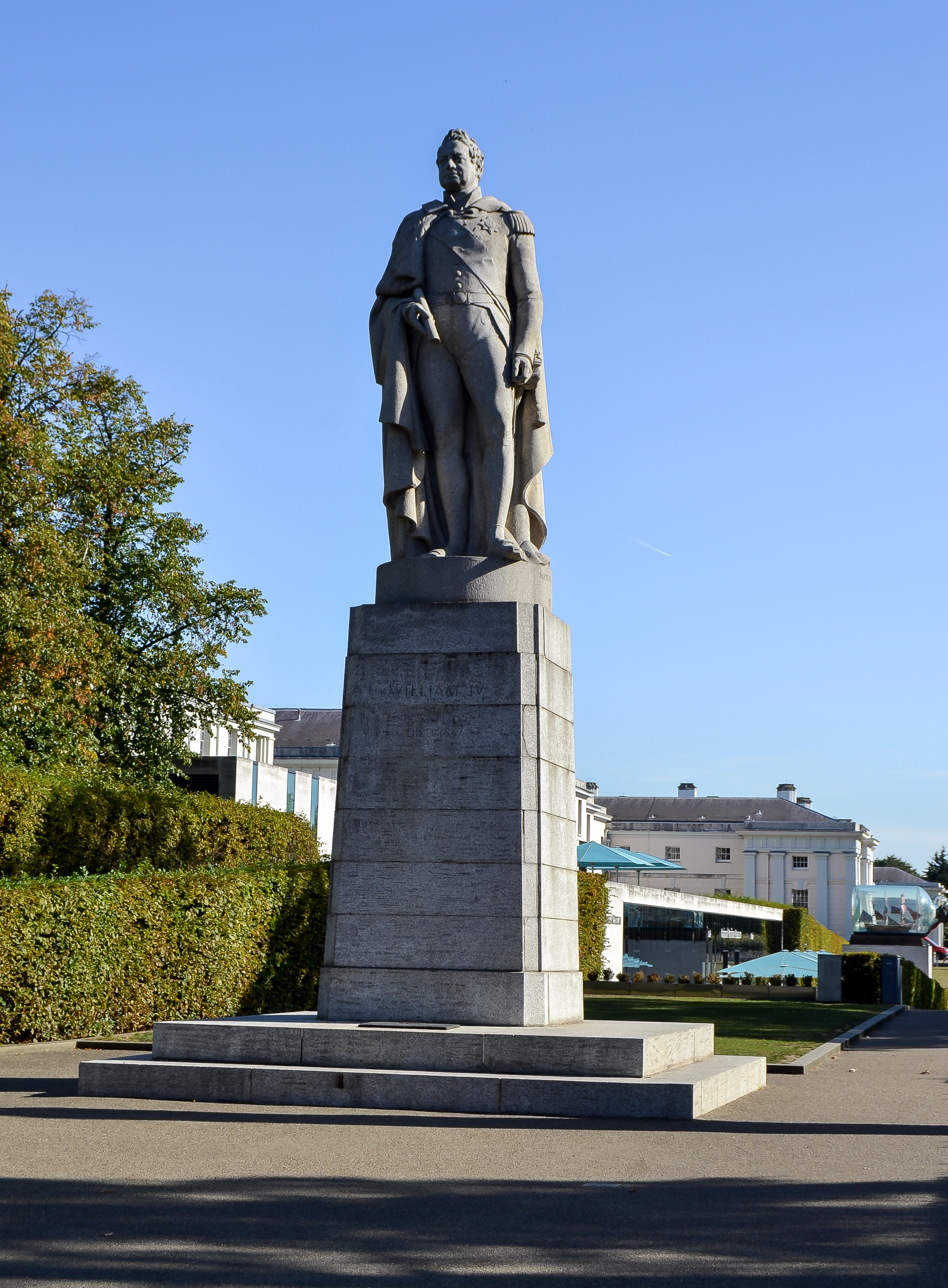
The granite statue of William IV now stands on the former site of St Mary's. The National Maritime Museum is in the background.

St Mary's was located on the edge of Greenwich Park. It was designed by the architect George Basevi in neo-classical style with the construction lasting from 1823 to 1825. The foundation stone was laid by Princess Sophia. There were hints of the style of John Soane, of whom Basevi had been an apprentice. It was demolished in 1935. Its place is now taken by a statue of William IV that was moved there from King William Street in the City of London. The site of the former church now sits on an approach to the National Maritime Museum.

== Bibliography ==
- Bradbury, Oliver. Sir John Soane? Influence on Architecture from 1791: A Continuing Legacy. Routledge, 2017.
- Howarth, William. Greenwich: past and present. Effingham Wilson, 1885.
- Ramzan, David C. Greenwich Reflections. Amberley Publishing Limited, 2021.
- Richardson, Albert E. Monumental Classic Architecture in Great Britain and Ireland. Courier Corporation, 2001.
