= Goldsmiths' Hall =

Livery hall in the City of London

Coordinates: 51.515671°N 0.095893°W

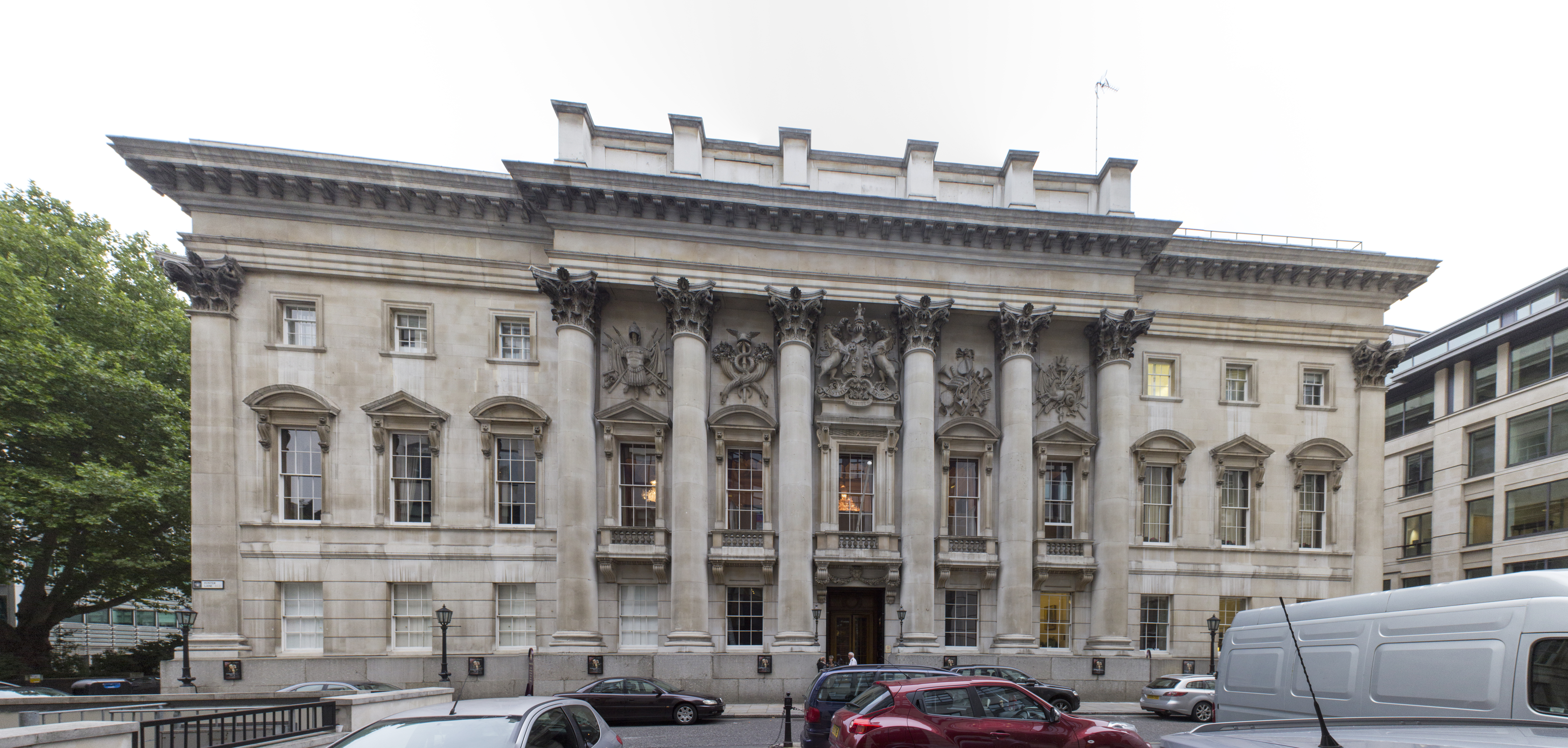
Goldsmiths' Hall

Goldsmiths' Hall is a Grade I listed building at the junction of Foster Lane and Gresham Street in the City of London. It has served as an assay office and the headquarters of London's goldsmith guild, the Worshipful Company of Goldsmiths, one of the livery companies of the City of London. The company has been based at this location since 1339, the present building being their third hall on the site.

== History ==
Little is known about the first hall. It was rebuilt in 1407 by Drugo Barentyn, a goldsmith who served twice as Lord Mayor of London.

The second hall was built circa 1634–36. In 1665, Samuel Pepys viewed the funeral of Sir Thomas Vyner from Goldsmiths' Hall. Pepys wore his best silk suit for the occasion, but the hall was so full of people that he left for Paternoster Square to order a new, ordinary silk suit. The hall was restored after the Great Fire of London in 1666 and eventually demolished in the late 1820s.

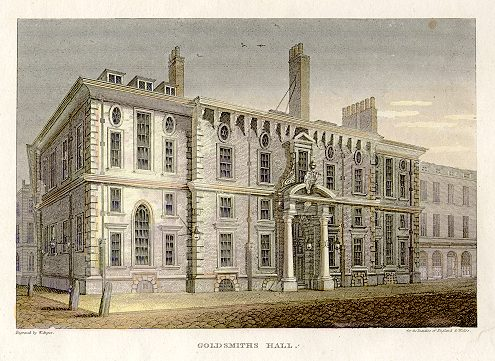
The second Goldsmiths' Hall c.1814

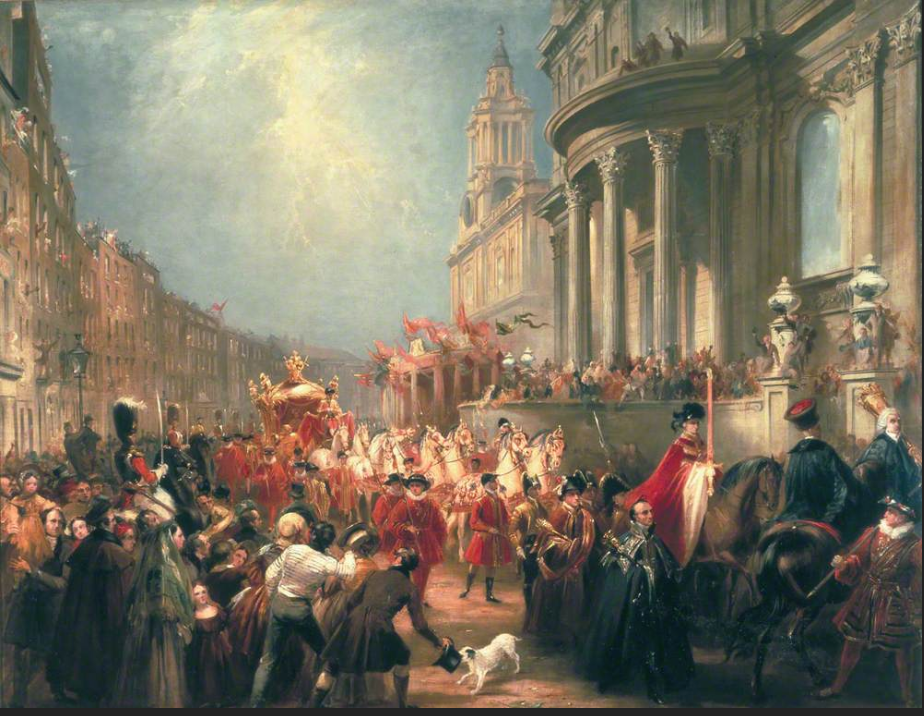
Queen Victoria's Procession to Goldsmiths' Hall by James Henry Nixon (1837)

The third and present hall was designed by Philip Hardwick, who commissioned sculptor Philip Nixon. Marble statues by Samuel Nixon of children representing the Four Seasons stand on pedestals on the lower flight of the grand staircase, which The Gentleman's Magazine described as “a work of the highest merit ... such beautiful personifications.” The hall is entirely detached and occupies an entire block. Despite its great size, it is the second largest livery hall after the Worshipful Company of Plaisterers' Plaisterers Hall at One London Wall. The Illustrated London News declared “’The Goldsmiths’ is the most magnificent of all the Halls of the City of London.” Those present at the opening dinner in 1835 included the Duke of Wellington and Robert Peel.

In 1941 a bomb exploded in its southwest corner, but the building largely survived and was restored after the Second World War.

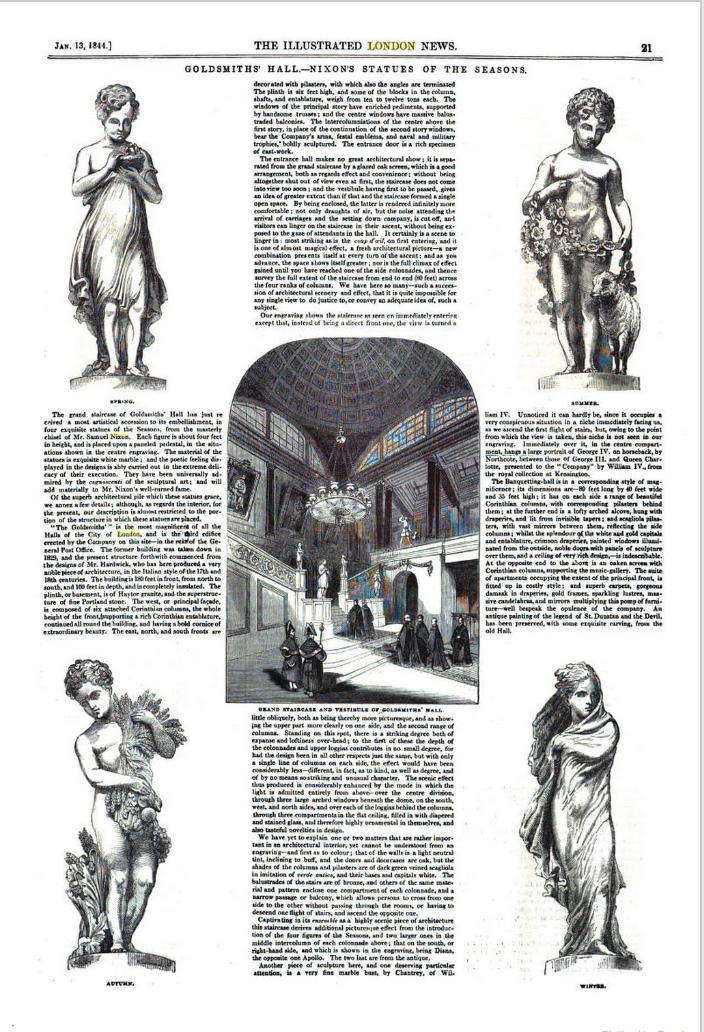
The Seasons by sculptor Samuel Nixon's, Goldsmiths' Hall, The Illustrated London News, 13 Jan 1844

From time to time, the Master and Wardens provide for open days to visit Goldsmiths' Hall.
