= Samuel Nixon (artist) =

English sculptor (1804–1854)

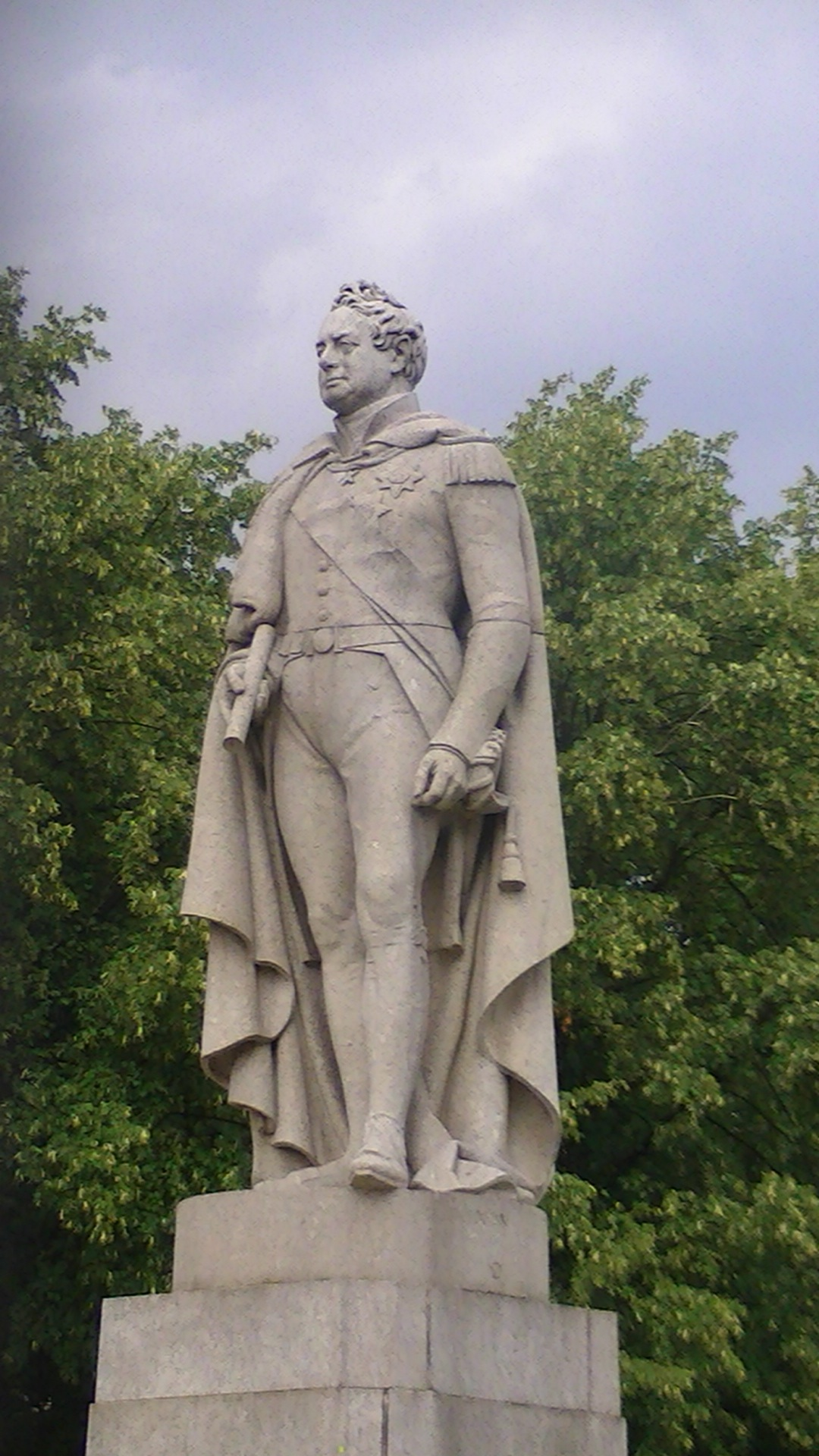
Statue of William IV by Samuel Nixon, Greenwich Park, London

Samuel Nixon (30 June 1804, London – 1854) was a portrait sculptor in London, England.

== Career ==
Nixon's workshop was at 2 White Hart, Bishopsgate (1838–1854). Nixon worked for his friend Henry Doulton who established Royal Doulton. He is most well known for the Devonshire granite sculpture of William IV (1844), which was originally located near London Bridge on King William St. and was moved to King William Walk in Greenwich in 1935. Gentleman's Magazine called it "a striking and imposing object… a masterpiece" and "one of the chief ornaments of the City of London." It was, they wrote, "admired by all who are capable of appreciating artistic genius."

He repeatedly exhibited at the Royal Academy (1824–1846).

Nixon also worked on Goldsmiths' Hall. He created the four marble statues of children that he entitled The Four Seasons (1844). The statues stand on four pedestals on the lower flight of the grand staircase. Gentleman's Magazine described as "a work of the highest merit ... such beautiful personifications." The Illustrated London News declared "'The Goldsmiths' is the most magnificent of all the Halls of the City of London." The white marble statues of "The Seasons" are described as "exquisite" and that Nixon achieved "extreme delicacy" with his "masterly chisel."

Gentleman's Magazine indicated that he has "been employed principally in Sepulchre sculpture, and had executed numerous works of a superior character in that class, many of which have been sent to Canada."

He died at Kennington House, Kennington Common in 1854.

== Family ==
Nixon was the seventh child of Thomas and Sarah Nixon, he was baptised at St Mary-at-Hill on 29 July. His elder brother was James Henry Nixon (1802–1857), a painter on glass. He was also the uncle of James Thomas Nixon.

== Gallery ==
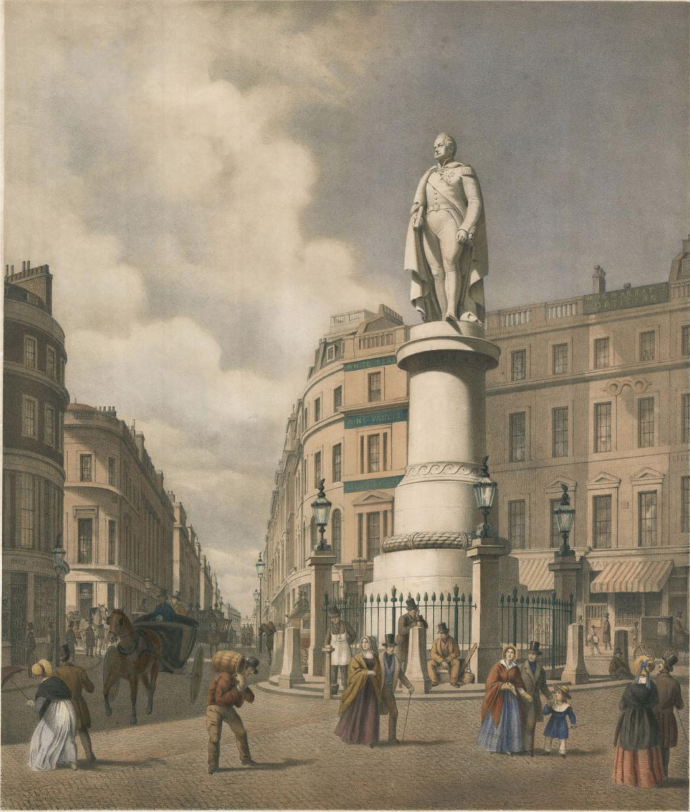
The Statue of William IV in its original location at King William Street, London (1844)

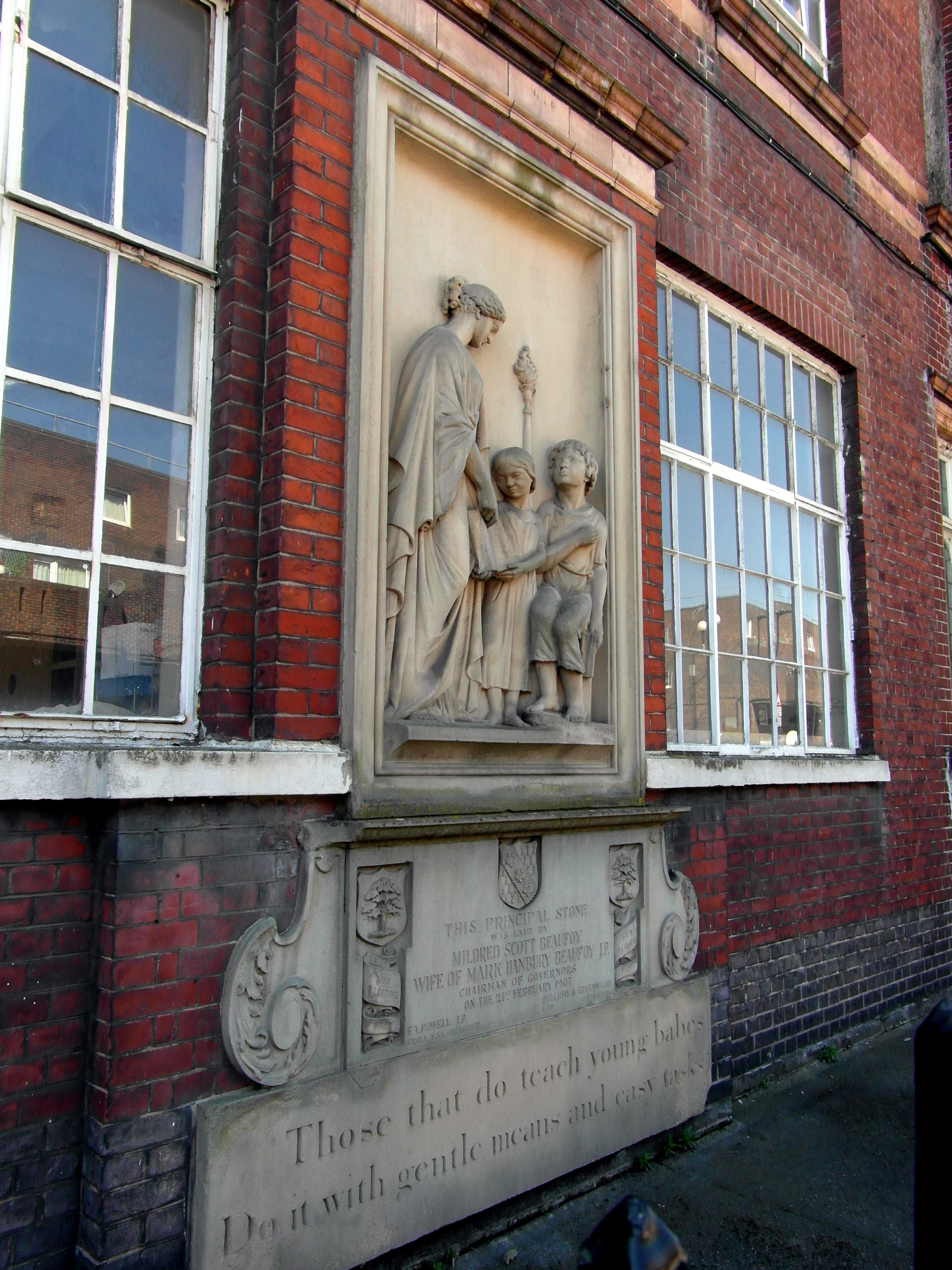
Beaufoy Institute (1850)

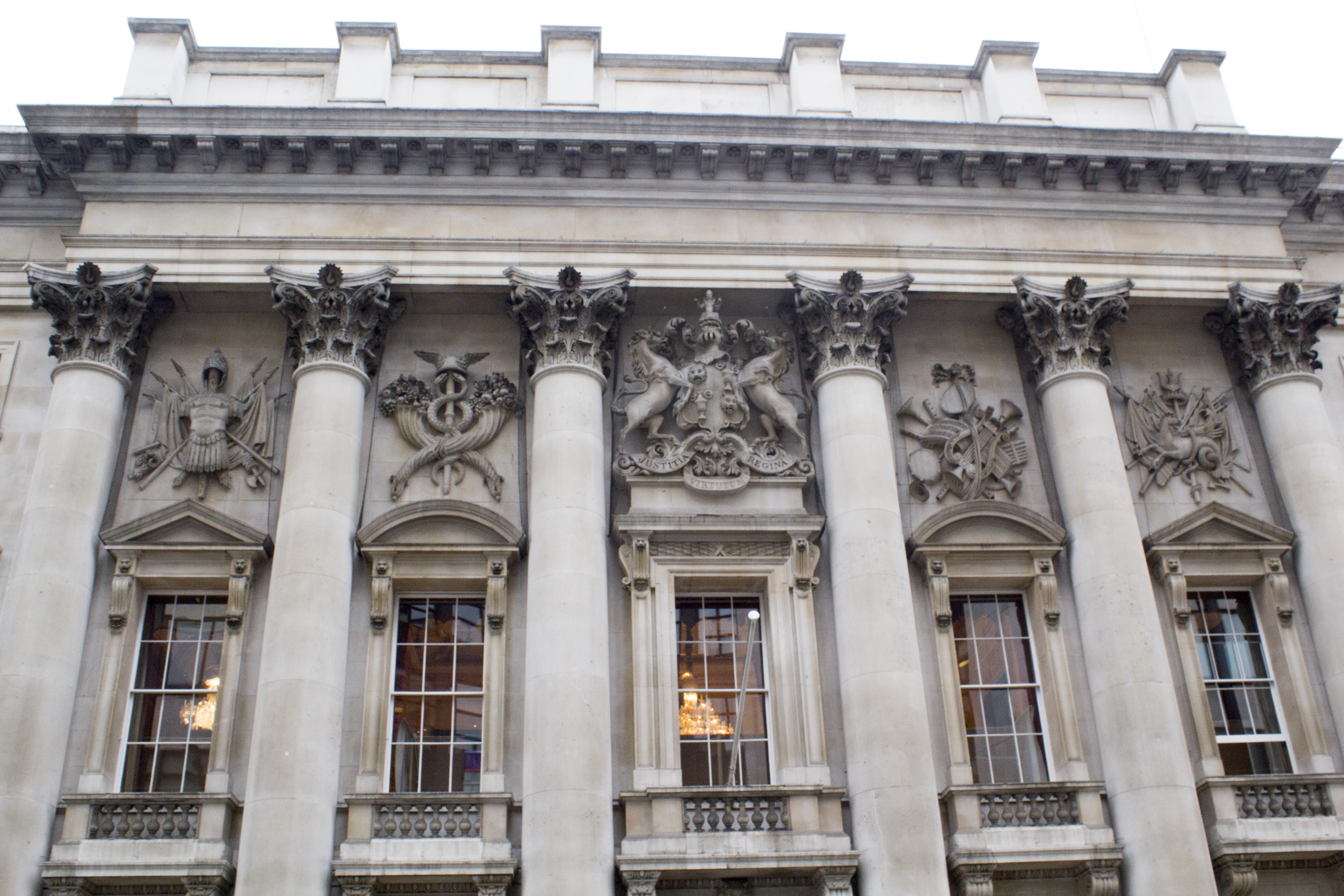
Goldsmiths' Hall

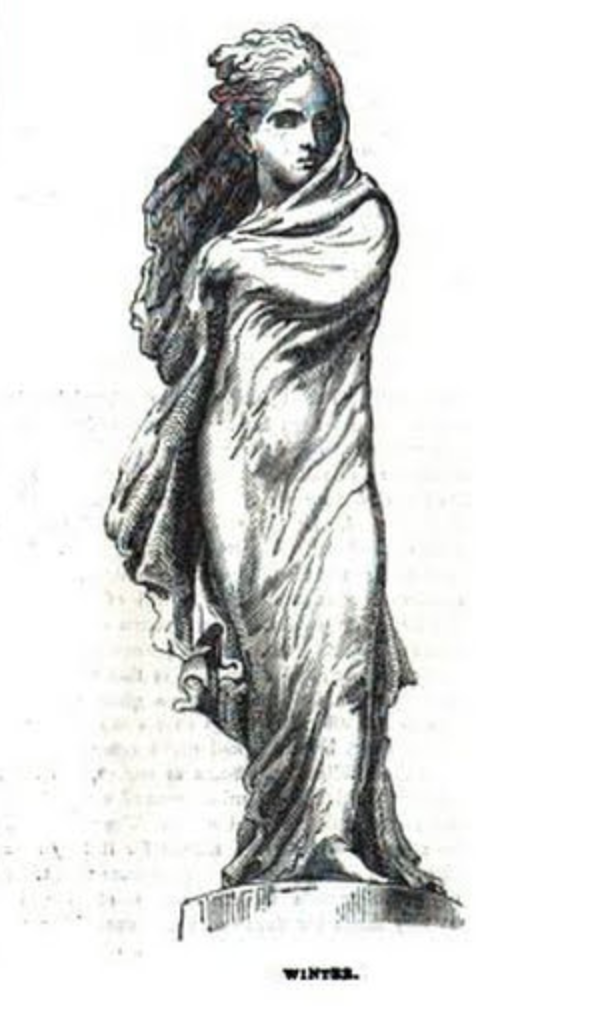
Engraving of Winter (Diana), from The Seasons

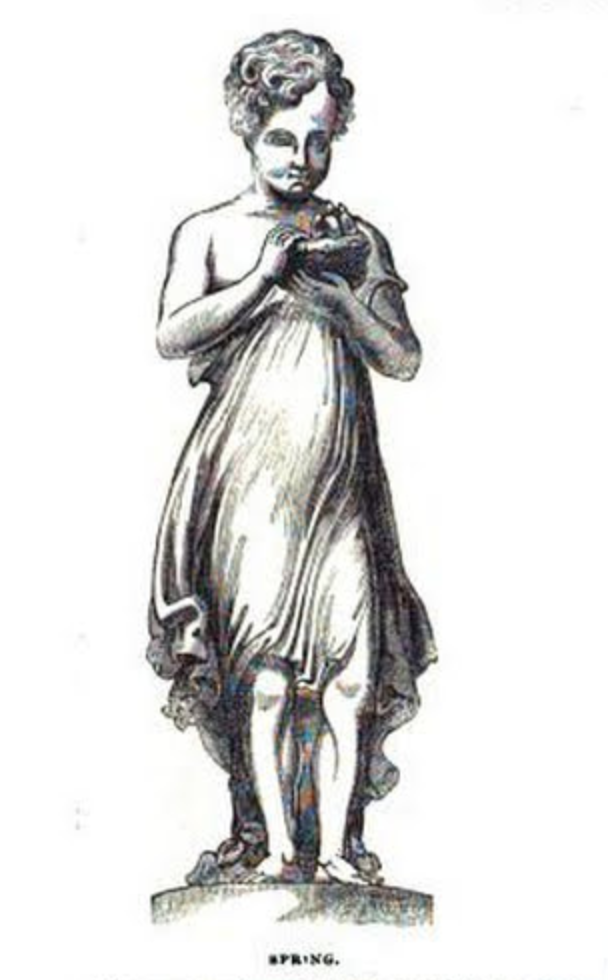
Engraving of Spring (Apollo), from The Seasons

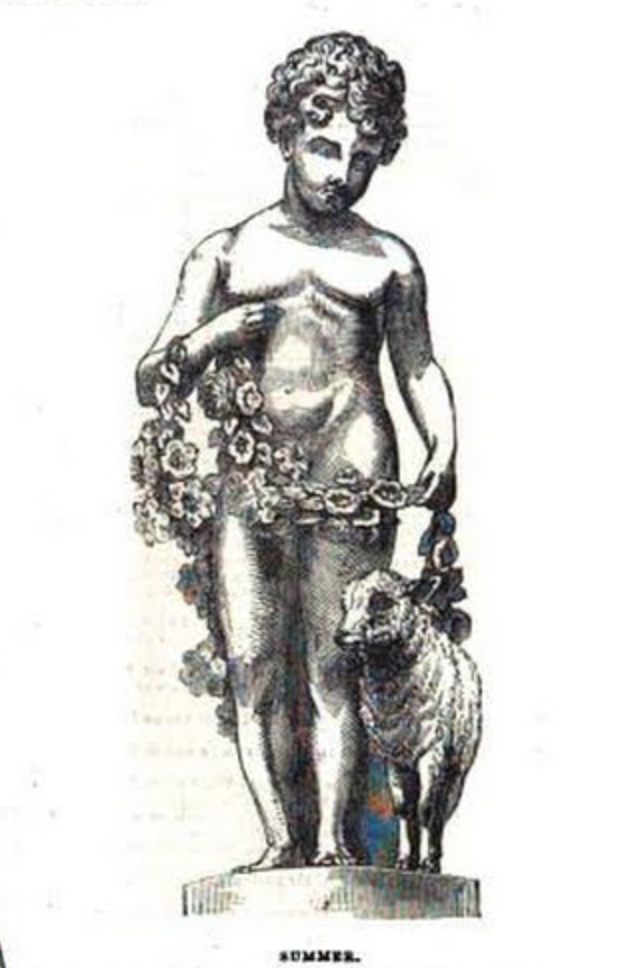
Engraving of Summer, from The Seasons

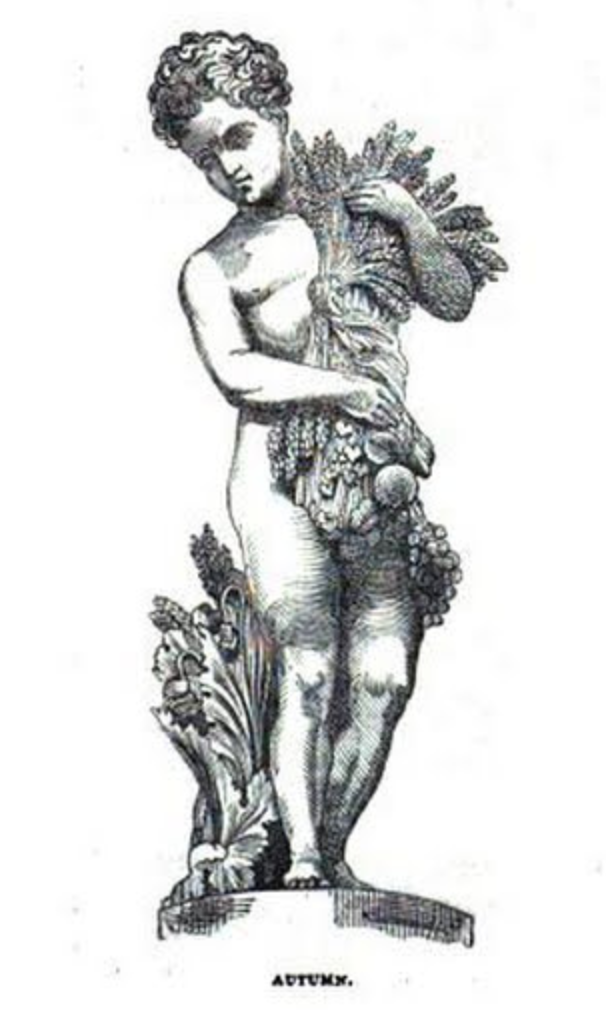
Engraving of Autumn, from The Seasons

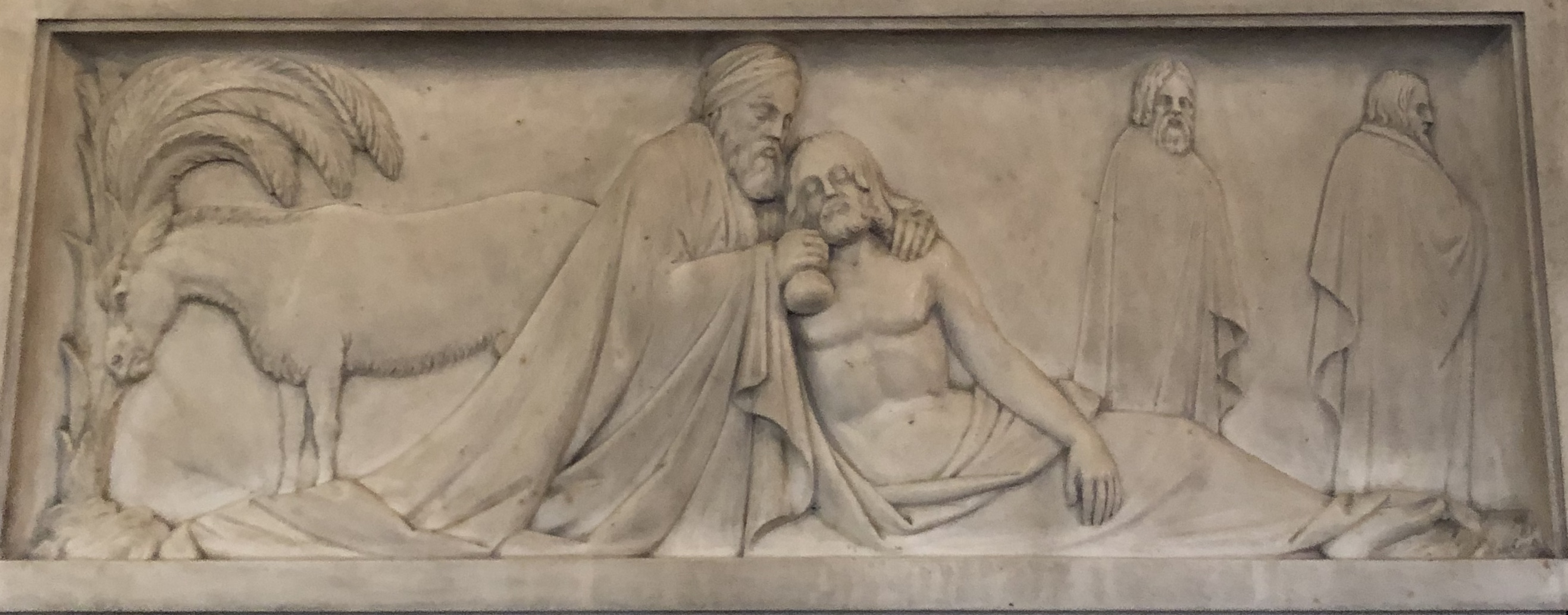
Parable of the Good Samaritan, St. Paul's Church (Halifax) (1840)

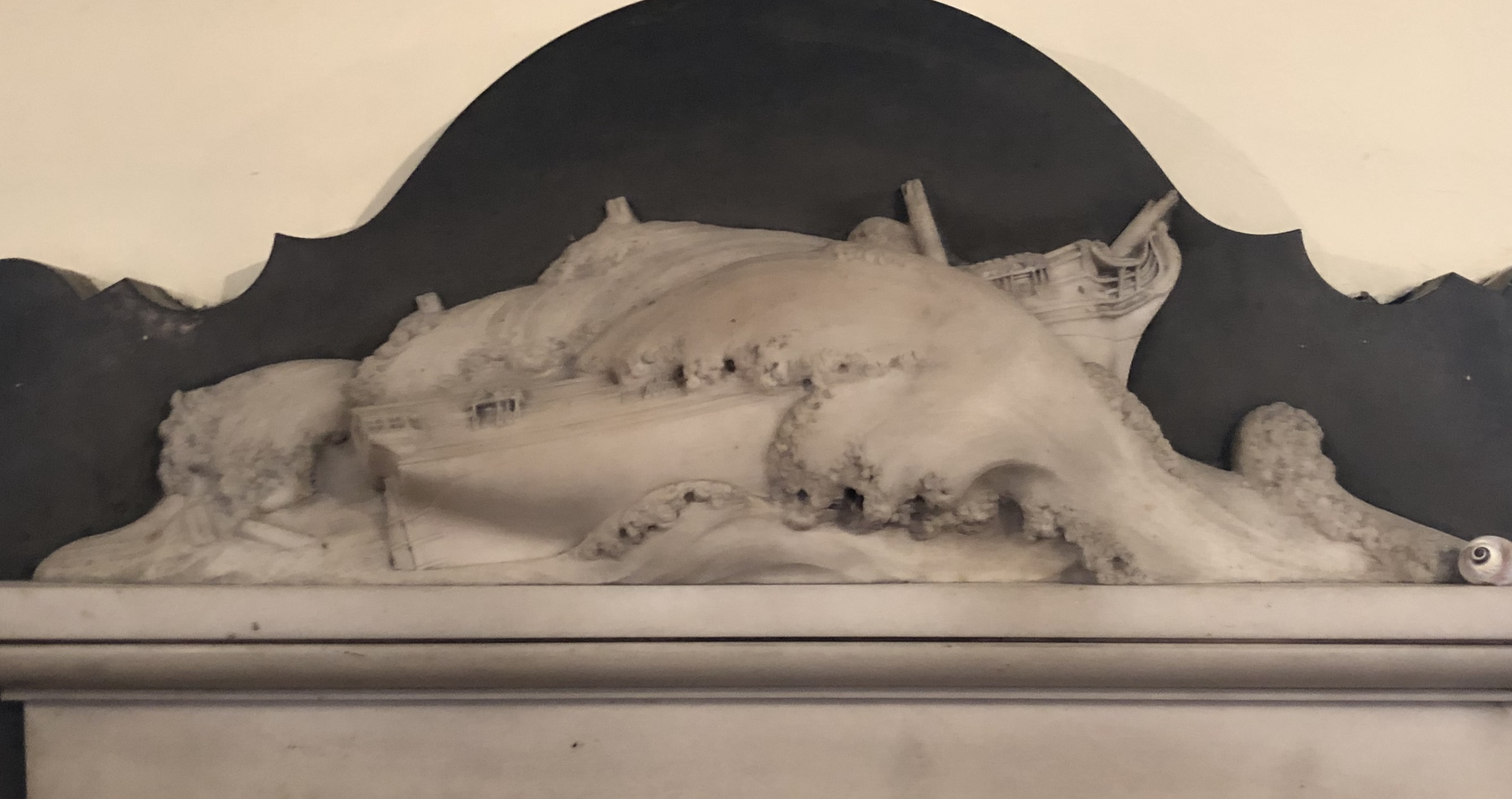
Shipwreck, St. Paul's Church (Halifax) (1835)

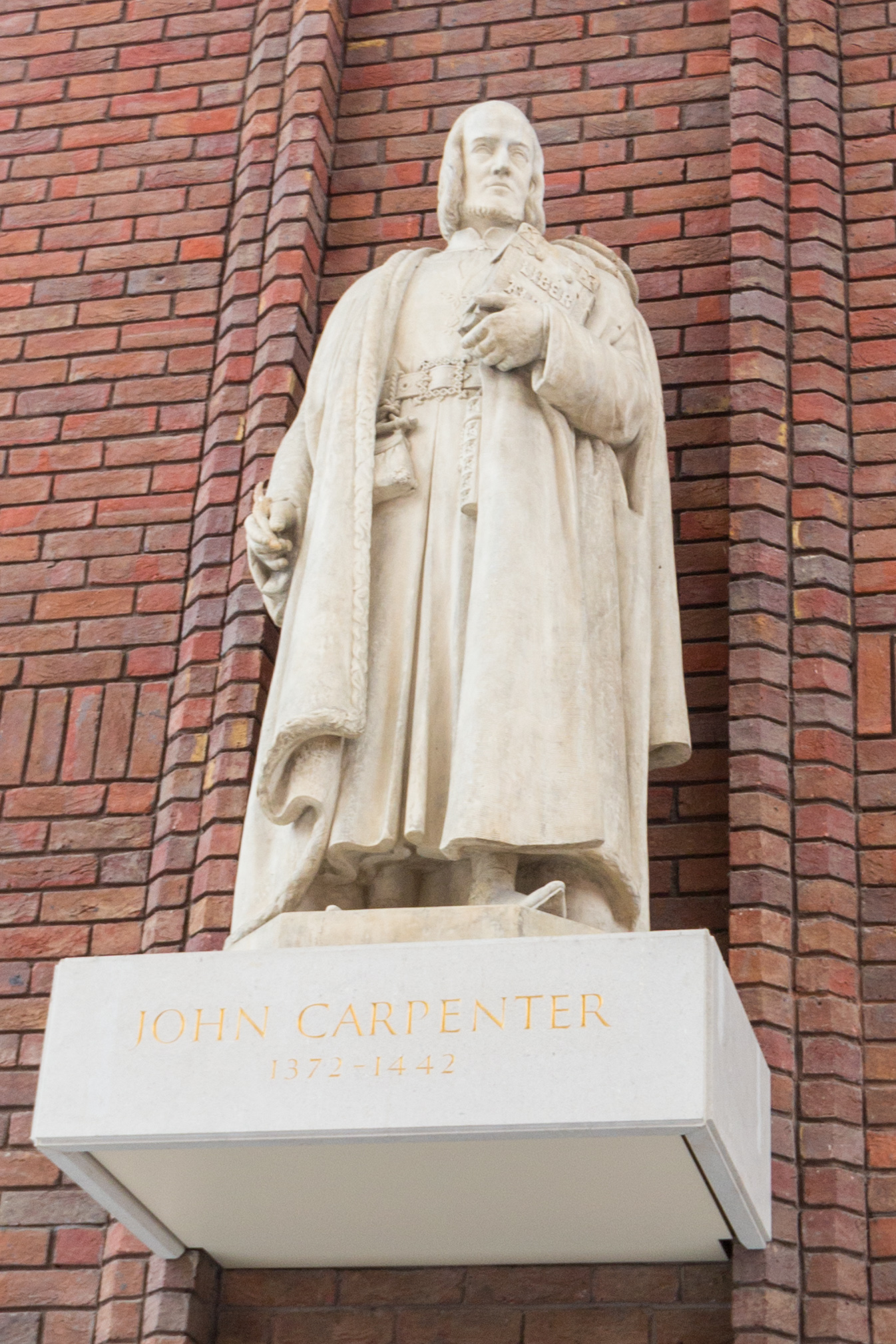
Statue of John Carpenter, City of London School (exhibited at Westminster Hall in 1844)

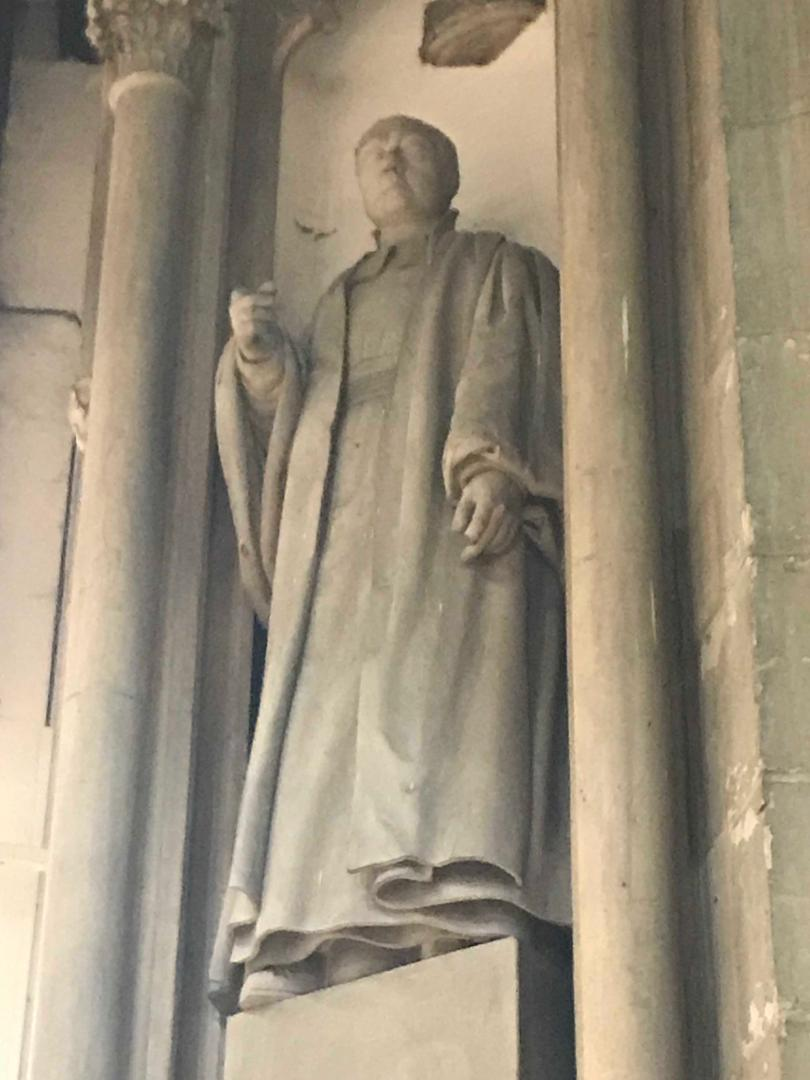
Statue of Richard Valpy, Headmaster of Reading School, St Laurence's Church, Reading (c. 1835) (Roche Abbey stone)

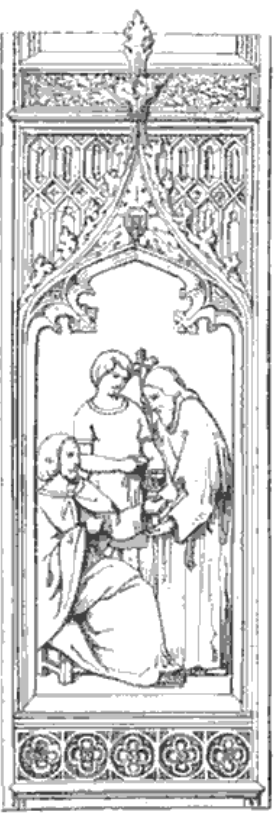
Design for the Principal Door of the House of Lords by Samuel Nixon (1844)

== Works ==
- In 1826 he exhibited at the Royal Academy ‘The Shepherd,’ in 1828 ‘The Reconciliation of Adam and Eve after the Fall,’ in 1830 ‘The Birth of Venus,’ and in 1831 ‘The Infant Moses.’
- Shakespeare (plaster bust after Shakespeare's funerary monument), City of London School (1846)
- John Stow, Plaster bust, (after bust in St Andrew Undershaft), City of London School
- Sir John Crosby, Crosby Hall, Bishopsgate Street
- Birth of Venus
- Dean Andrews (minister), St Nicolas Church, Great Bookham, Surrey
- The ‘Four Seasons’, Goldsmiths’ Hall, City of London, grand staircase
- Rev.William Rodber, St Mary-at-Hill
- William Johnson Rodber, St Mary-at-Hill (1843)
- Richard Johnston Rodber
- Rev. William Parker, St Ethelburga's Bishopsgate
- Thomas Reynolds, Boxmoor, Herts
- Samuel Whiteway, Kingsteignton, Devon
- A relief bust of John Milton, Sotheby Olympia, 25 April 2002; private coll
- Richard Cobden, Bronze statuette after S. Nixon. Marshall Library of Economics, Cambridge. (1846)
- George Wynch, Pett, Sussex (1836)
- The Gillespie Monument, St. John's Wood Chapel
- Philip Lucas (minister), Hackney (parish) (1830)
- Revd. George Avery Hatch, St Vedast Foster Lane (1837)
- Martha Hatch, daughter of Henry Emlyn of Windsor”, St Vedast Foster Lane
- John Marshall, St. Leonard's, Shoreditch
- Design for the principal door of the House of Lords, illustrating scenes from the life of Alfred the Great

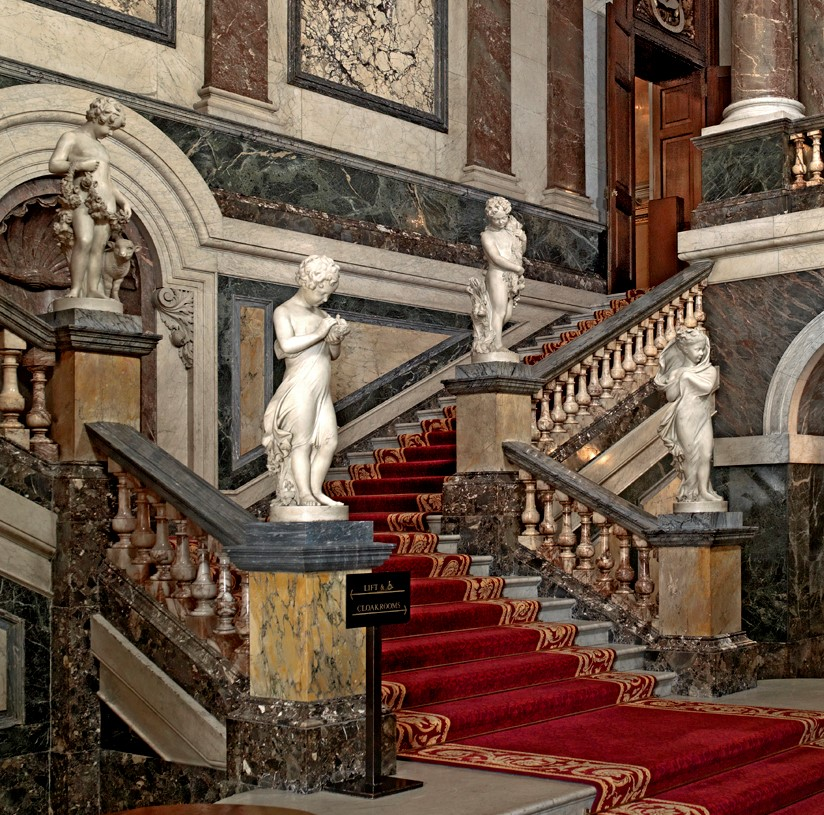
The Seasons, Goldsmiths Hall, London by Samuel Nixon

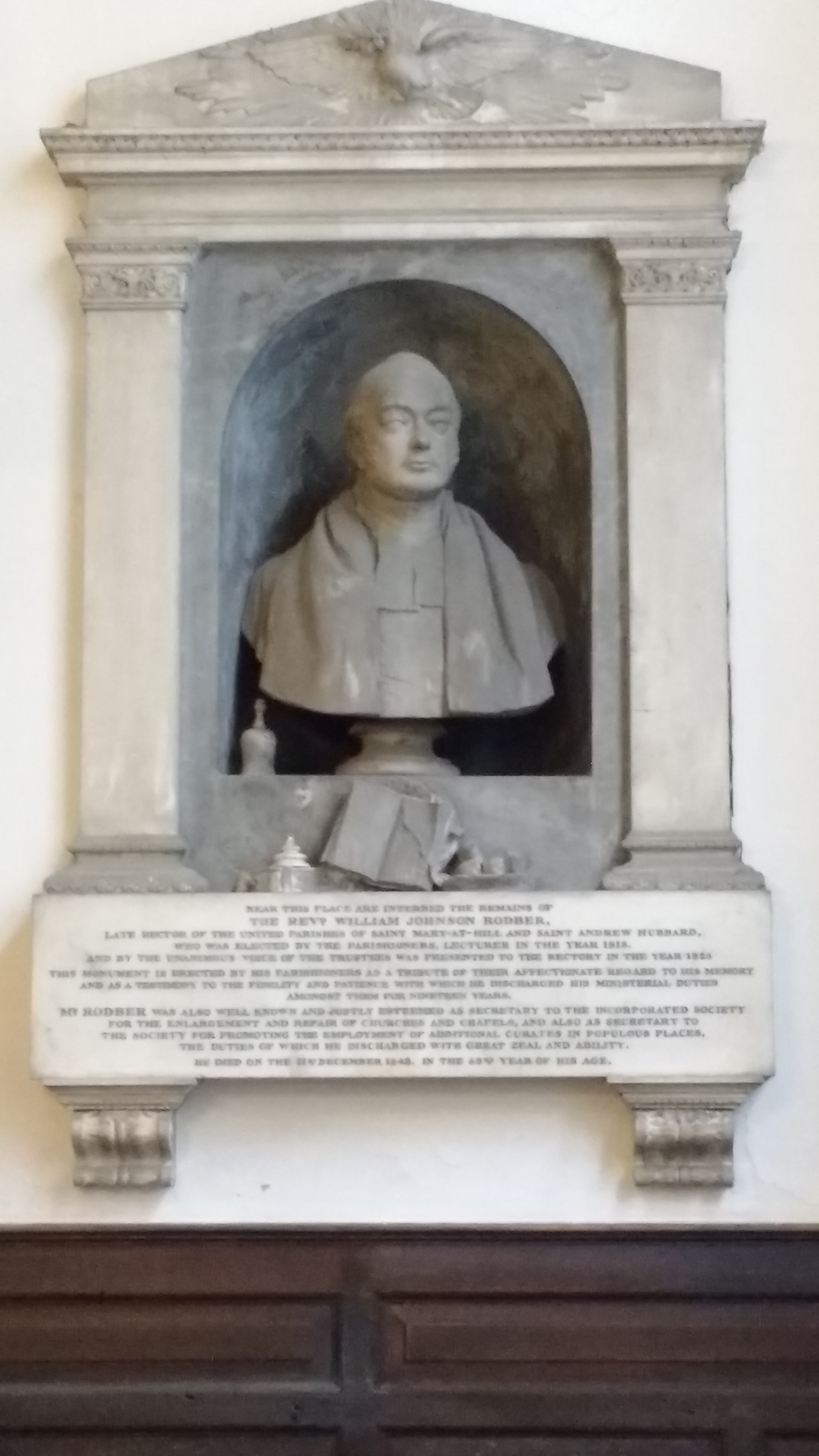
William Johnson Rodber, St Mary-at-Hill by Samuel Nixon

== Links ==
- Samuel Nixon – A Biographical Dictionary of Sculptors in Britain, 1660–1851
- Dictionary of National Biography, vol. 41

== See also ==
- List of monumental masons
