= Gresham Club =

London gentlemen's club

Coordinates: 51.5119°N 0.0881°W

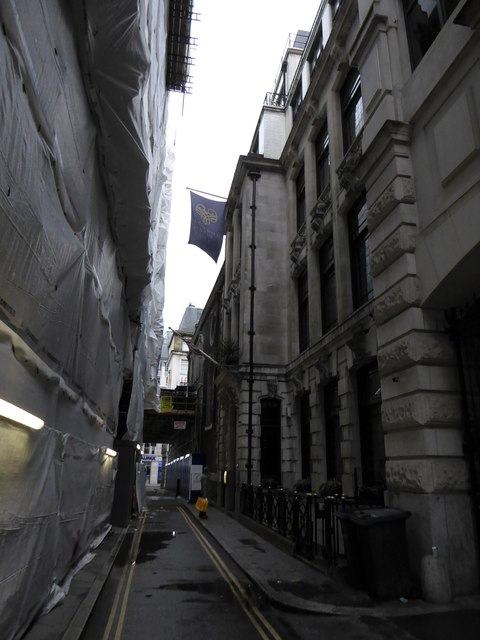
The club's purpose-built clubhouse at 15 Abchurch Lane, in 2016

The Gresham Club was founded in 1843 and dissolved in 1991. It was named after Thomas Gresham. The Gresham Club's last site was located on Abchurch Lane off King William Street before it was sold to the London Capital Club, which in turn ceased operation in 2018. Following the closure of the London Capital Club, a number of the members relaunched The Gresham Club in 2018 and recreated the raison d'être of its original predecessor.

== Formation and membership ==
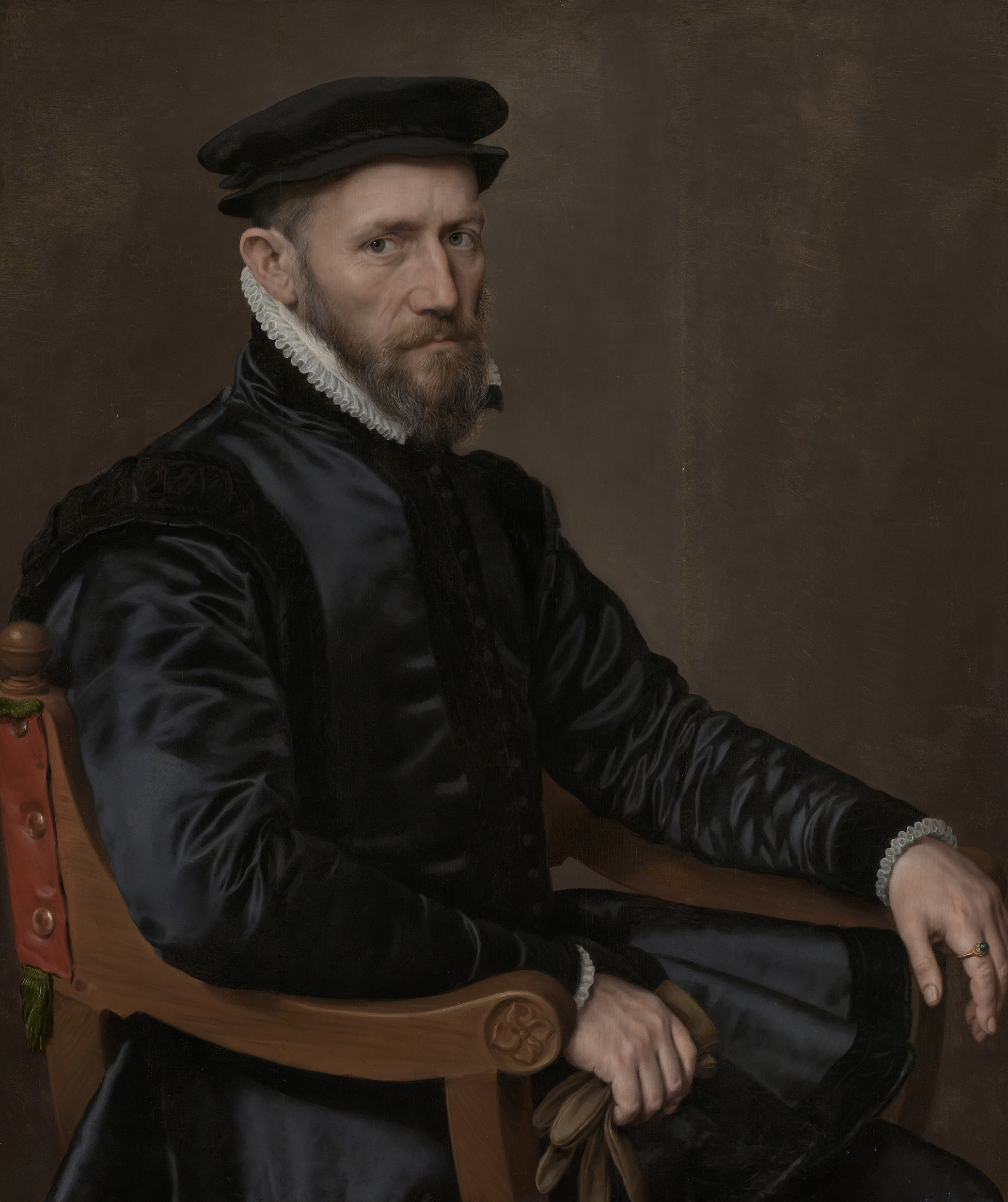
Portrait of Thomas Gresham by Anthonis Mor

The original Gresham Club was founded in 1843 as a dining club for the professional classes of the City of London, and named after Thomas Gresham, a celebrated Elizabethan merchant who founded the Royal Exchange. The club's first president was John Abel Smith (1802–1871), member of parliament for Chichester.

In 1853, Charles Manby Smith located the Gresham Club as a stepping-stone in a successful Londoner's sequence of increasingly elite memberships. –

...from having been wise enough to join the grocer's Plum-pudding Club, they shall end by becoming prosperous enough to join the Whittington Club, or the Gresham Club, or the Athenaeum Club, or the Travellers' Club; or the House of Commons, or the House of Lords either.

In 1879, the entrance fee was 20 guineas and the annual subscription six guineas, as reported by Charles Dickens, Jr., in Dickens's Dictionary of London (1879). –

Gresham Club is composed of merchants, bankers, and other gentlemen of known respectability. No candidate is eligible until he has attained the age of twenty-one years. Election by ballot of the members, of whom 30 must actually vote. One black ball in ten shall exclude. Entrance fee, £21; subscription, £6 6s.

== Premises ==
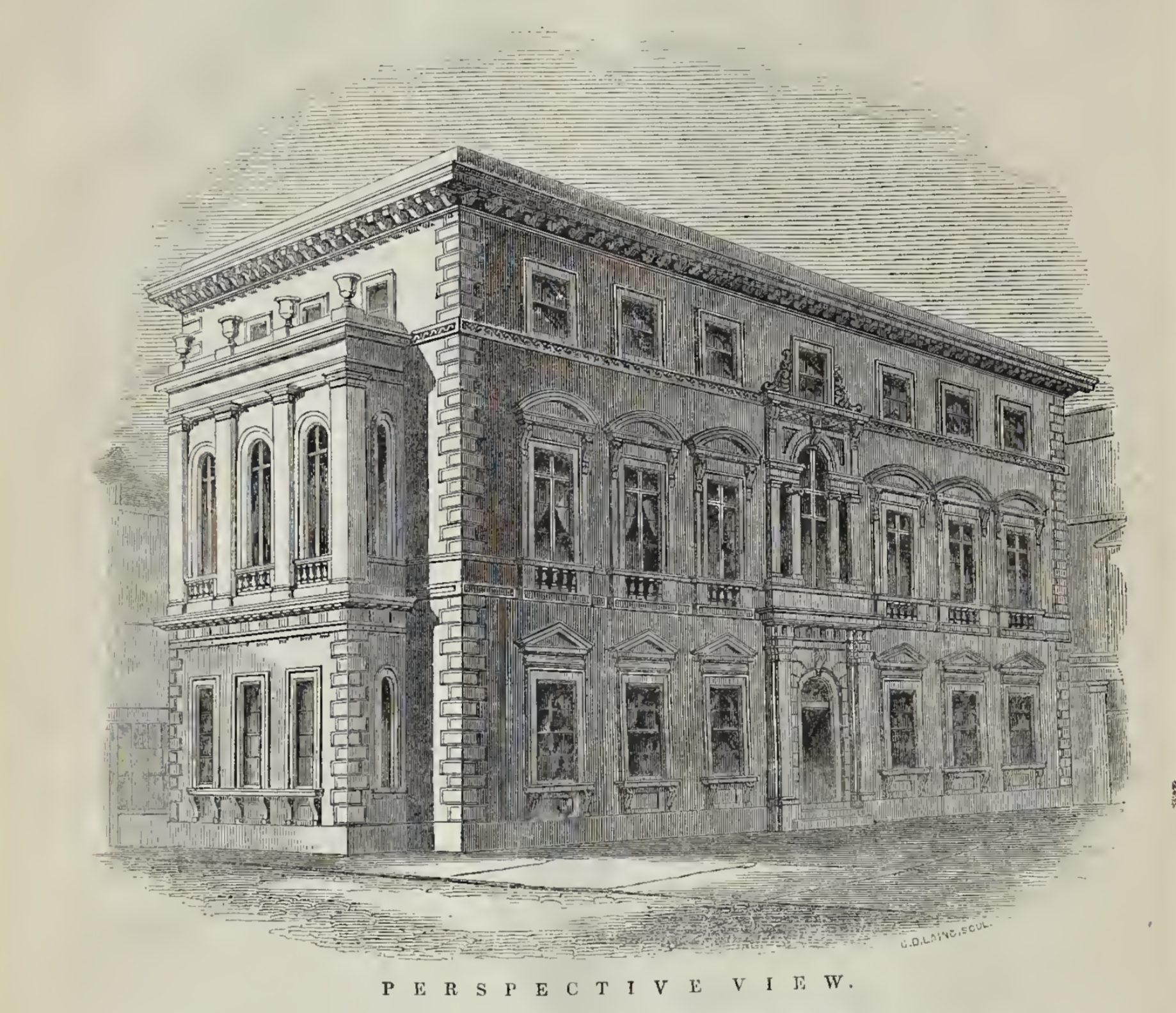
Perspective view of the Gresham clubhouse, from The Builder, March 1844

The newly established club commissioned a clubhouse at 1 King William Street, on the corner of St. Swithin's Lane. The architect was Henry Flower, and the beginning of construction in 1844 was marked by a dinner at the Albion Tavern, at which Sir William Magnay, Lord Mayor of London, presided.

John Timbs wrote in 1855 –

GRESHAM CLUB-HOUSE, St Swithin's-lane, King-William-street, City, was built in 1844, for the Club named after Sir Thomas Gresham, who founded the Royal Exchange. The Club consists chiefly of merchants and professional men. The style of the Club-house (H. Flower, architect) is Italian, from portions of two palaces in Venice.

The site of the first clubhouse is now occupied by the main London office of N M Rothschild & Sons. The club was reported to keep a fine wine-cellar. In 1913, a Mr. L. Price, called 'the doyen of billiard stewards', achieved 60 years service with club, then housed in Gresham Place. In 1915, the club moved to a new purpose-built clubhouse at 15 Abchurch Lane, near Cannon Street station. The club remained there until it closed in 1991.

== Dissolution ==
After the Second World War, the gentlemen's clubs of London fell into a decline. The Gresham Club was "a faded place offering school dinners and port". By 1991, its membership had fallen and the remaining members decided to dissolve the club. Its members were offered membership of the City University Club, many of them taking this offer.

On 23 October 1992, the "Gresham Club (In Dissolution)" was given a listed building consent to remove 11 glass chandeliers on the ground, first, and second floors of 15 Abchurch Lane.

The club's records were deposited in the Guildhall Library, which under accession reference L 24 MSS 28834-28864 holds papers for the years 1844-1845 and 1905–1991, described as: "minute books, subscription books, legal papers, financial papers, Staff Benevolent Fund accounts and misc papers".

== The Gresham Club today ==
The re-formed Gresham Club is a private members club for professionals, 'stimulating social and business interaction amongst like-minded members and their guests'. The Club is currently a nomadic dining club that meets monthly for a Club Table at a different venue each month. Venues include The Army and Navy Club, The Caledonian Club and London Scottish Horseferry Road drill hall. In October 2020 Members of the Gresham Club set up the registered charity - the Gresham Benevolent Fund approved as charity number 1192072. The charity has a separate governance structure to the Club but is largely supported by Gresham Club Members.

== Later use of the Abchurch Lane clubhouse ==
On 18 February 1993, "Abchur Flat Gibr", represented by Wright Hassall & Co., Solicitors, of Leamington Spa, was granted a certificate of lawful development for the use of the former club's premises at 15 Abchurch Lane, as "members licensed dining club for the purposes of dining drinking socialising and playing snooker". In 1993, the clubhouse was acquired by CCA Holdings, who found it in need of renovation and refurbishment. The development was funded by the International Club Company of Hong Kong, founded in 1980 by Dieter Klostermann. The company owns and operates many clubs around the world, including businessmen's clubs, golf clubs and country clubs.

On 21 October 1993, Capital Club of London Ltd was given a listed building consent for 15 Abchurch Lane, described as "Repairs and restoration of interior and exterior of building which is to be retained as members' dining club. Installation of new roof plant and screening" and also planning permission for "installation of roof plant and screen". The new interior was designed by Peter Inston. In September 1994, the building was re-opened as the London Capital Club, a private members' club with similarities to the old Gresham Club but a more modern approach and a different management structure. On the death of Peter Parker in 2002, Angela Knight, a former Economic Secretary to the Treasury, succeeded as the club's chairman.

In the spring of 2018 the London Capital Club premises in Abchurch Lane were sold to the Royal Philatelic Society. The building contains a memorial to the 77 members of the Gresham Club that served in The Great War. With the help of funding from the War Memorials Trust the memorial was refurbished, and was re-dedicated on 7 December 2022 by the Bishop of London, the Rt Revd and Rt Hon. Dame Sarah Mullally.

== See also ==
- List of gentlemen's clubs in London
