= King William Street, London =

Street in England

Coordinates: 51°30′34″N 0°5′13″W

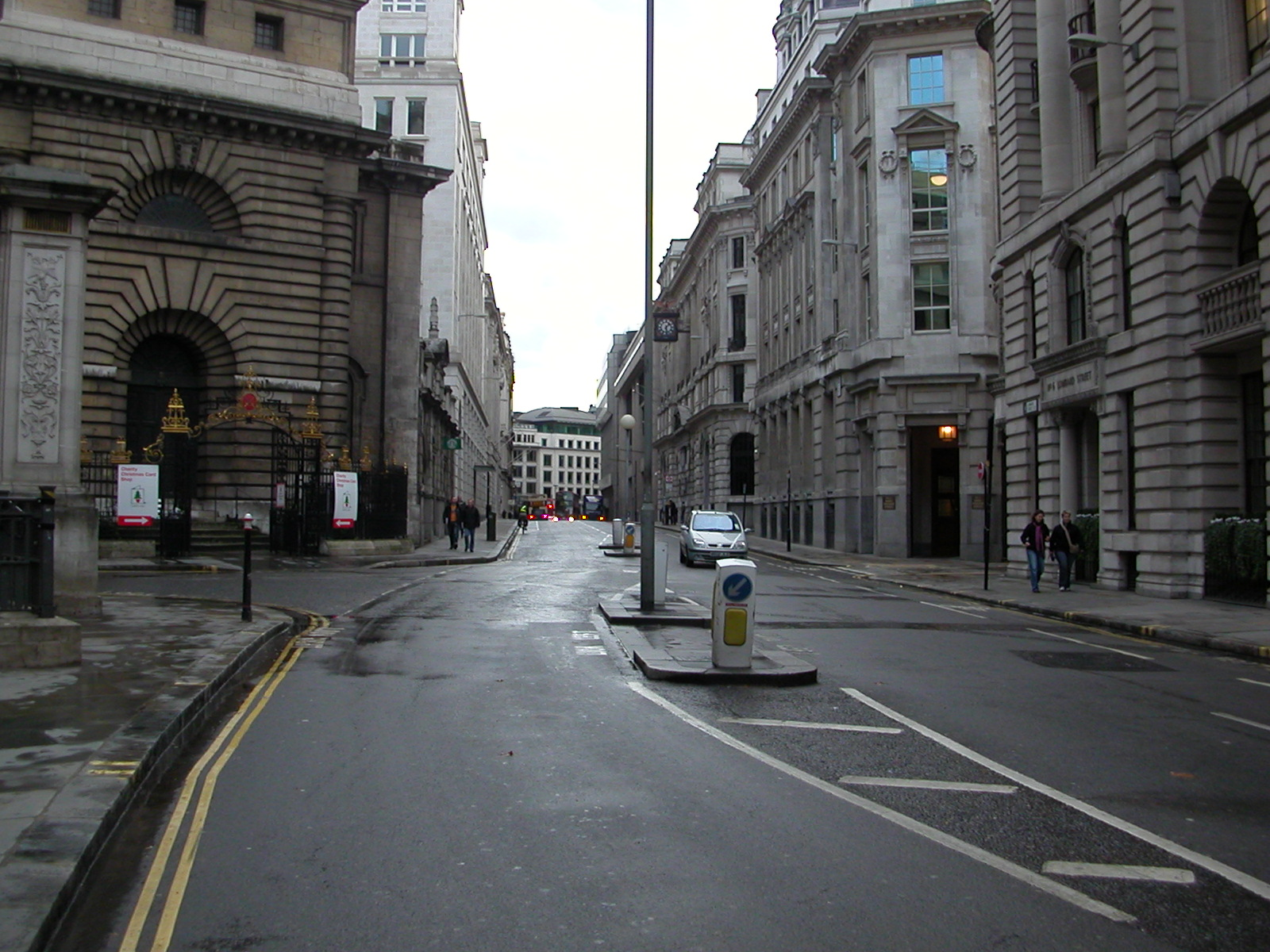
North end of King William Street looking towards Monument station.

King William Street is a street in the City of London, the historic nucleus and modern financial centre of London. It is a two-way street linking Lombard Street, at its northern end, with London Bridge, which marks the start of the start of the A3 route to Portsmouth.

== Geography ==
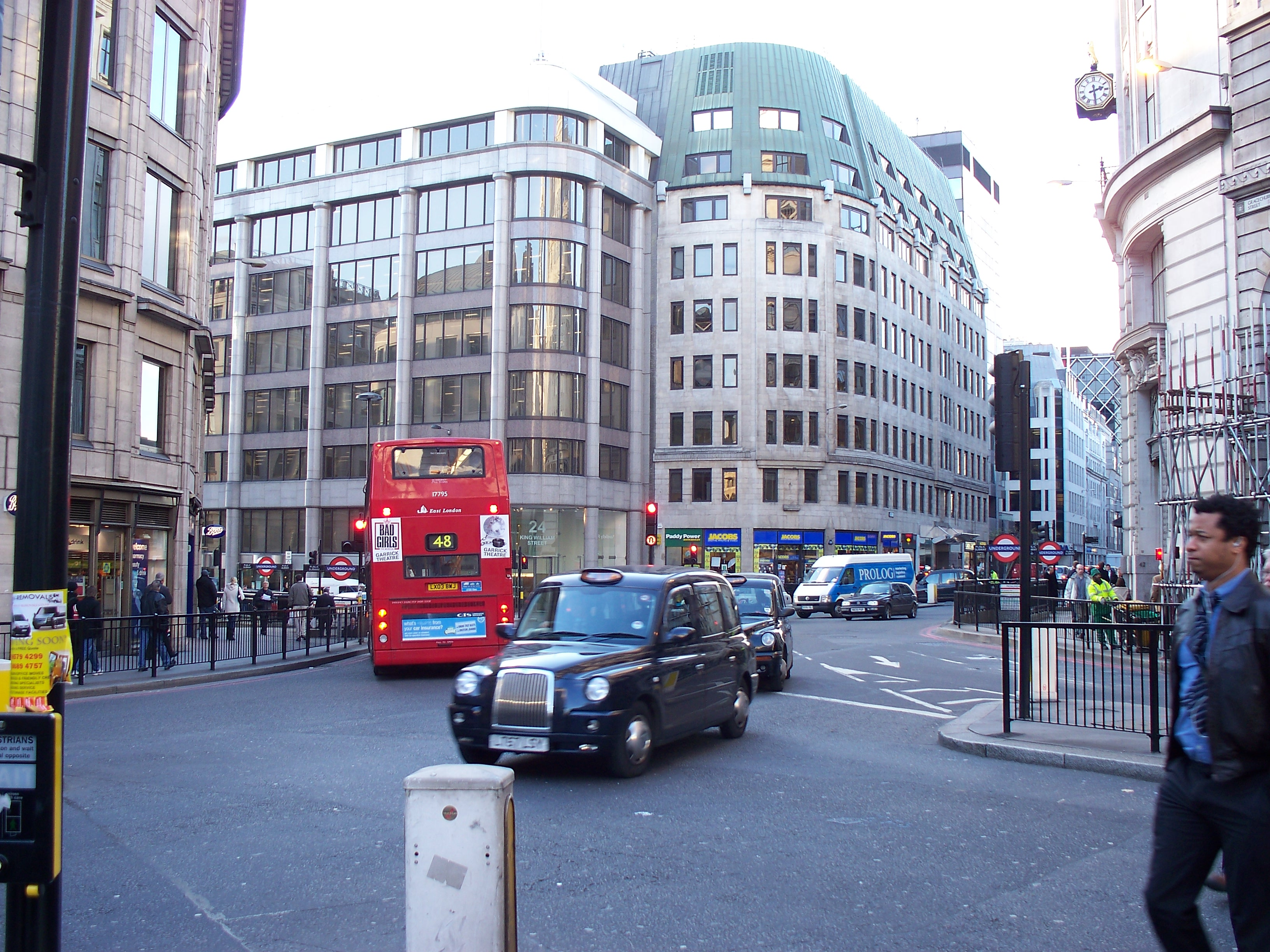
Monument junction, where King William Street and Gracechurch Street converge.

King William Street runs from its northern end at a junction with Lombard Street by the church of St Mary Woolnoth, southeast to Monument junction, where it meets Gracechurch Street and Cannon Street. King William Street then continues south into London Bridge. The nearest London Underground stations are Bank and Monument; the former King William Street station was once sited on the road, at the corner of Monument Street.

The road was built between 1829 and 1835 and is named after the reigning monarch of the time, King William IV. From 1844 to 1936 a Statue of William IV sat on a column in the street before being relocated to King William Walk in Greenwich. In 1902 King William Street was the scene of the fatal stabbing of Arthur Reginald Baker by his lover Kitty Byron, at an entrance to the Lombard Street post office which at that time was located on King William Street. Today, it houses a number of investment banks and City firms.

== Notable buildings ==
- No. 1, was originally constructed as the head office of the London Assurance Corporation on the site of the first clubhouse of the Gresham Club. It has housed the Rothschild headquarters.
- No. 5, erected in 1915, on a design by John Macvicar Anderson and his son Henry Lennox Anderson, head office of the Phoenix Assurance Company from 1915 to 1983.
- No. 68, erected in 1920–1922, also designed by Henry Lennox Anderson, for the Guardian Assurance Company
- No. 81, erected in 1925–1927 as the head office of the London Life Association, designed by William Curtis Green.
- Adelaide House, a Grade II listed building, is located at the far southern end of King William Street, adjacent to London Bridge.
- Opposite and also adjacent to the bridge is Fish Hall, the livery hall of the Worshipful Company of Fishmongers.

== In literature ==
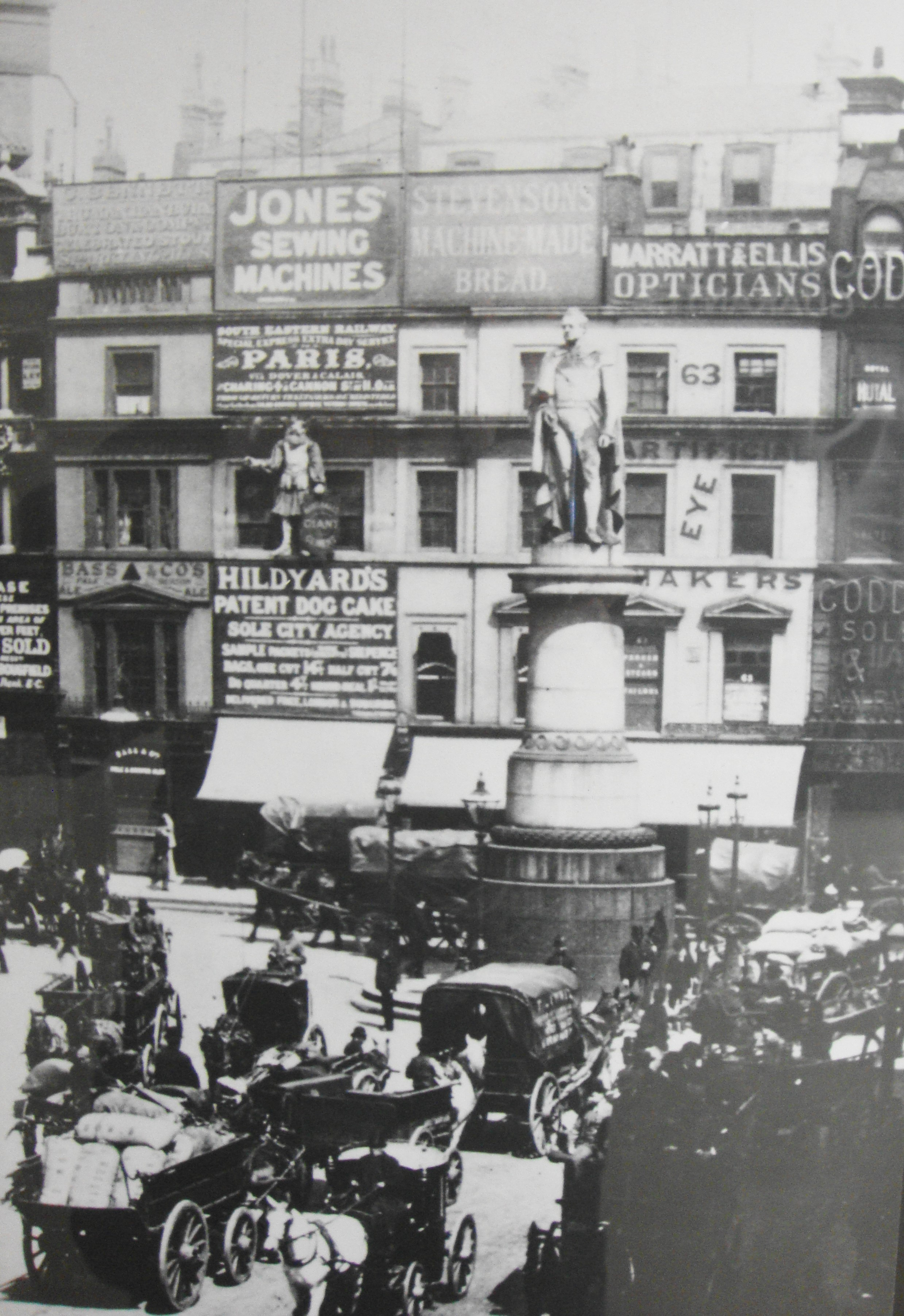
King William Street c. 1890, photographed by Francis Frith.

King William Street is mentioned in T. S. Eliot's poem The Waste Land. Lines 60–68 read:

Unreal City,
Under the brown fog of a winter dawn,
A crowd flowed over London Bridge, so many,
I had not thought death had undone so many.
Sighs, short and infrequent, were exhaled,
And each man fixed his eyes before his feet.
Flowed up the hill and down King William Street,
To where Saint Mary Woolnoth kept the hours
With a dead sound on the final stroke of nine.

— The Waste Land, T. S. Eliot

At the time he wrote this section, Eliot was working for a bank in the city.

== See also ==
- A3 road, the London to Portsmouth route which originates on King William Street
- Bank junction, a major junction to the north of King William Street
- Eastcheap, a road to the east of King William Street
- St Clement Eastcheap, on Clement's Lane, off King William Street
- St Magnus-the-Martyr, close to King William Street
- St Mary Abchurch, on Abchurch Lane, off King William Street
