= London Fenchurch Street =

London Fenchurch Street may refer to:

- Fenchurch Street, London
- Fenchurch Street railway station, London
