= Earl of Oxford's case =

1615 English ruling on equity and common law

Earl of Oxford’s case
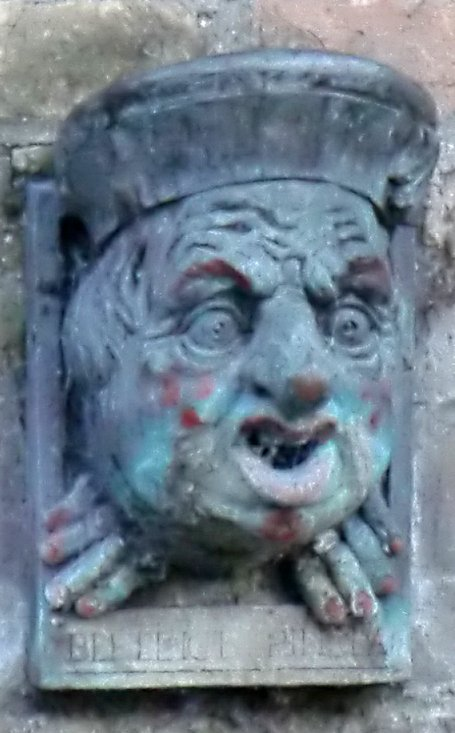
- Gargoyle of Benedict Spinola, who Magdalene College, Cambridge, believed had cheated them out of their land
- Court: Court of Chancery
- Decided: 1615
- Citation: (1615) 1 Ch Rep 1, (1615) 21 ER 485
- Transcript: CommonLII

Keywords
- Equity, law

Earl of Oxford's case (1615) 21 ER 485 is a foundational case for the common law world, that held equity (equitable principle) takes precedence over the common law.

The Lord Chancellor held: "The cause why there is chancery is, for that men's actions are so diverse and infinite, that it is impossible to make any general law which may aptly meet with every particular act, and not fail in some circumstances."

The judgment stresses that the legal position for chancery (equity) is tempered to dealing with voids (lacunae) in the common law, a principle regularly asserted in the courts of appeal as "equity follows the law", one of the maxims of equity which taken together impose many limits on the eligibility of cases and applicants.

The King decreed on the advice of the Attorneys General that if there was a conflict between the common law and equity, equity would prevail. Equity's primacy in England was later enshrined in the Judicature Acts in 1873 and 1875, which also served to fuse the courts of equity and of common law (although not the systems themselves) into one unified court system.

== Facts ==
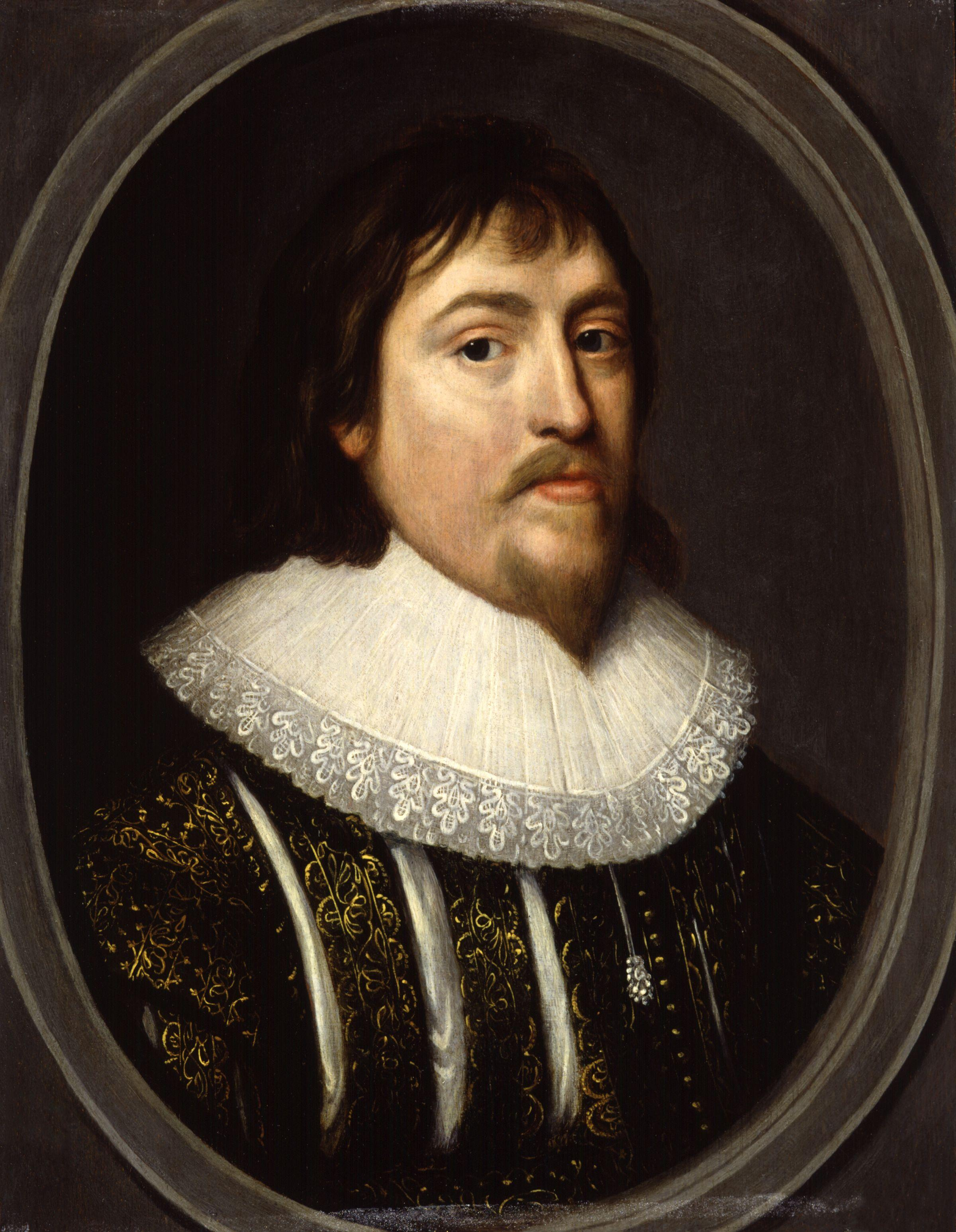
Henry de Vere believed he should have title to certain land rather than Magdalene College, Cambridge. Chancery – the courts in equity – agreed; however, this provoked a disagreement between the courts, resolved by the Monarch advised by the Attorneys General.

A statute, the Ecclesiastical Leases Act 1571, provided that conveyances of estates by the masters, fellows, or any college dean to anyone for anything other than a term of 21 years, or three lives, "shall be utterly void".

Not mindful of this, Roger Kelke, Master and the Fellows of Magdalene College, Cambridge sold some of its land (at St Botolph's Aldgate in London) to Queen Elizabeth I. The queen then granted the land to Benedict Spinola, a Genoese merchant. It was generally thought among those preparing and signing these conveyancing deeds that the transfer to the Queen or transfer from the Queen would amount to an unwritten exception, allowing for new unimpeachable title (ownership). Spinola thought this, and so did Edward de Vere, the Earl of Oxford, who bought the land in 1580 and built 130 houses. John Warren leased a house through intermediaries.

Then, Barnabas Gooch, Master (1604–1624) considered that, in the light of the 1571 Act, he was able to lease the land to John Smith and allowed him into occupation as such. Warren brought an action of ejection against Smith, but his lease expired before it was heard by court. Warren asked the question to be decided anyway.

== Judgment ==
=== Jury ===
The Jury held that Smith took possession unlawfully (that is, through the more recent lease by Gooch on behalf of the college) the long-term Elizabethan sale in apparent defiance of the Act was good, and in the jury's view was as good a title as almost any. The first instance verdict was therefore sitting tenant Warren was entitled to eject Smith.

=== King's Bench ===
Chief Justice Coke overturned the jury and held the earlier land transfer was void, caught by the Ecclesiastical Leases Act 1571. The monarch was 'the fountain of justice and common right' and could not be exempted from a statute aimed to maintain the advancement of learning. Therefore, Gooch, acting for the college had validly leased the property to Smith. This caught sub-tenants too (sub-lessees): Warren could not eject (nor be found to have any rights against) Smith under his fresh lease from the college.

However, in 1604, the alleged owner of the large parcels of land in question Edward de Vere, 17th Earl of Oxford had died, succeeded by his son and heir Henry (b. 1593) who was a minor. He and another tenant, Thomas Wood, brought the case in the Court of Chancery. Gooch and Smith refused to answer the bill and refused to appear, asserting that it was void. The Chancery Court committed them to Fleet Prison for contempt of court.

=== Chancery ===
Lord Ellesmere LC, issued a common injunction out of the Court of Chancery prohibiting the enforcement of the common law order, and granting the Earl of Oxford and his tenants quiet enjoyment of the land, in other words meaning that the statute did not void the initial transaction of the land. It stayed all common lawsuits against the Earl. He began his judgment by referencing the Bible, Deuteronomy 28:30, saying he "that builds a House ought to dwell in it; and he that plants a Vineyard ought to gather the Grapes thereof." He remarked that common law judges themselves ‘play the Chancellors Parts’ in taking the equitable construction of statutes to be law properly speaking. The Chancery, however, was not like a Court of Appeal. Instead, the Chancery had a unique position.

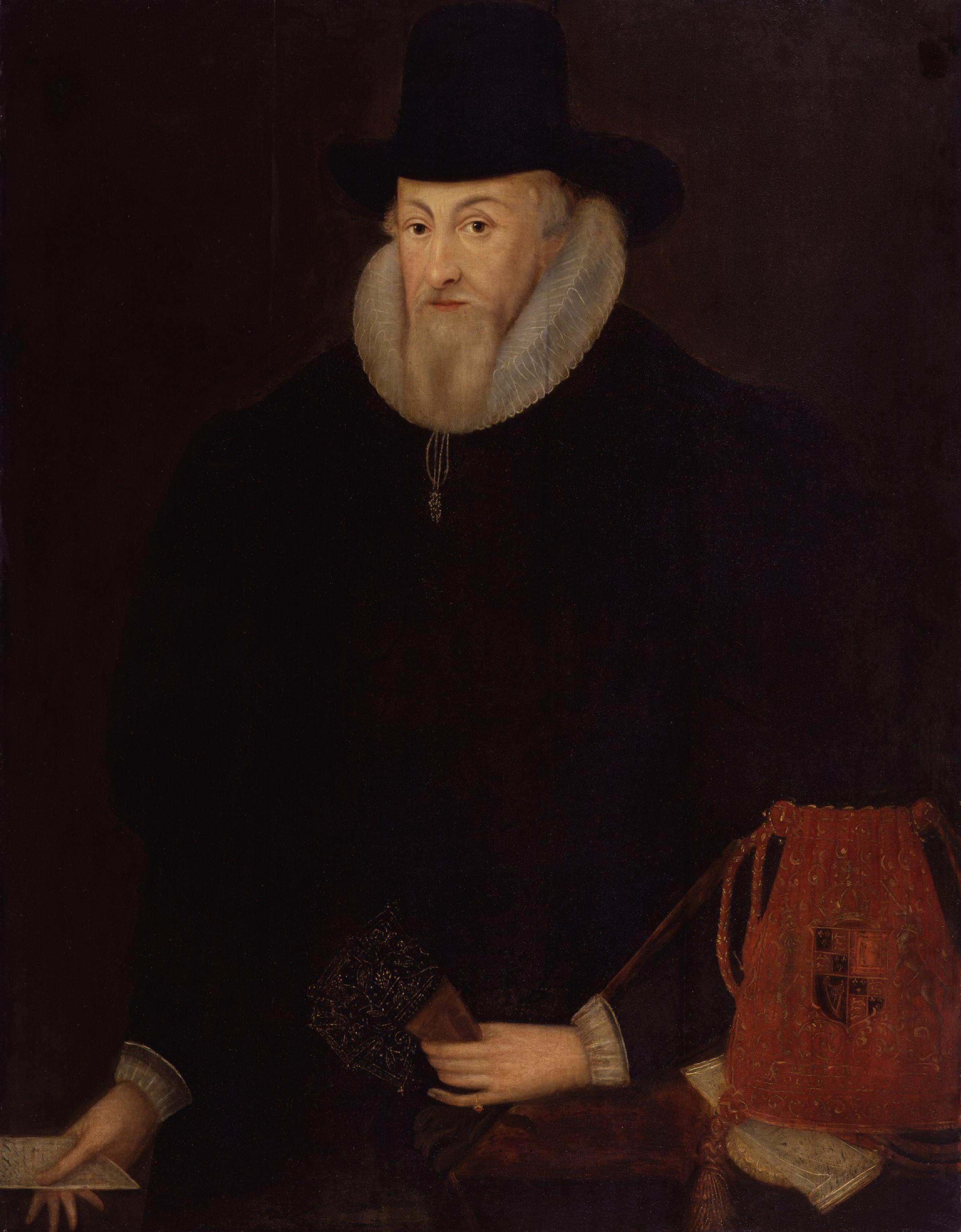
Thomas Egerton, 1st Viscount Brackley was the Lord Chancellor who gave judgment.

The Office of the Chancellor is to correct Men’s consciences for Frauds, Breach of Trusts, Wrongs and oppressions, of what Nature soever they be, and to soften and mollify the Extremity of the Law, which is called summum jus.

And for the judgment, &c., law and equity are distinct, both in their courts, their judges, and the rules of justice; and yet they both aim at one and the same end, which is to do right; as Justice and Mercy differ in their effects and operations, yet both join in the manifestation of God's glory.

… when a Judgment is obtained by Oppression, Wrong and a hard Conscience, the Chancellor will frustrate and set it aside, not for any error or Defect in the Judgment, but for the hard Conscience of the Party.

[...]

In this Case there is no Opposition to the Judgment; neither will the Truth or justice of the Judgment be examined in this Court, not any Circumstance depending thereupon.

[...]

The Cause why there is Chancery is, for that Men[']s Actions are so divers[e] and infinite, That it is impossible to make any general Law which may aptly meet with every particular Act, and not fail in some Circumstances.

== Royal and Attorneys General determination of priority of law and equity ==
As a result of Lord Ellesmere's decision, the two courts became locked in a stalemate. Lord Ellesmere effectively appealed to King James I, who referred the matter to the Attorney General for the Prince of Wales and Sir Francis Bacon, the Attorney General for England and Wales. Both recommended a judgment in Lord Ellesmere's favour, which King James I approved. He issued a declaration saying:

as mercy and justice be the true supports of our Royal Throne; and it properly belongeth to our princely office to take care and provide that our subjects have equal and indifferent justice ministered to them; and that when their case deserveth to be relieved in course of equity by suit in our Court of Chancery, they should not be abandoned and exposed to perish under the rigor and extremity of our laws, we ... do approve, ratifie and confirm, as well the practice of our Court of Chancery.

The word 'well' in the King's determination meant not just 'good' but also 'superior'. The King decreed on the advice of the Attorneys General that if there was a conflict between the common law and equity, the latter would prevail. Equity's primacy in England was later enshrined in the Judicature Acts in 1873 and 1875, which also served to fuse the courts of equity and of common law (although not the systems themselves) into one unified court system.

== See also ==
- English trusts law
- Unconscionability in English law
- English land law
  - Estoppel in English law
  - Proprietary estoppel
  - Possession is nine-tenths of the law
  - Declaratory relief
  - Formalities in English law
    - Quia Emptores
    - Feet of fines
    - Statute of Frauds (1677)
    - Void and Voidable Contracts
