= Leadenhall Market =

Covered market in the City of London

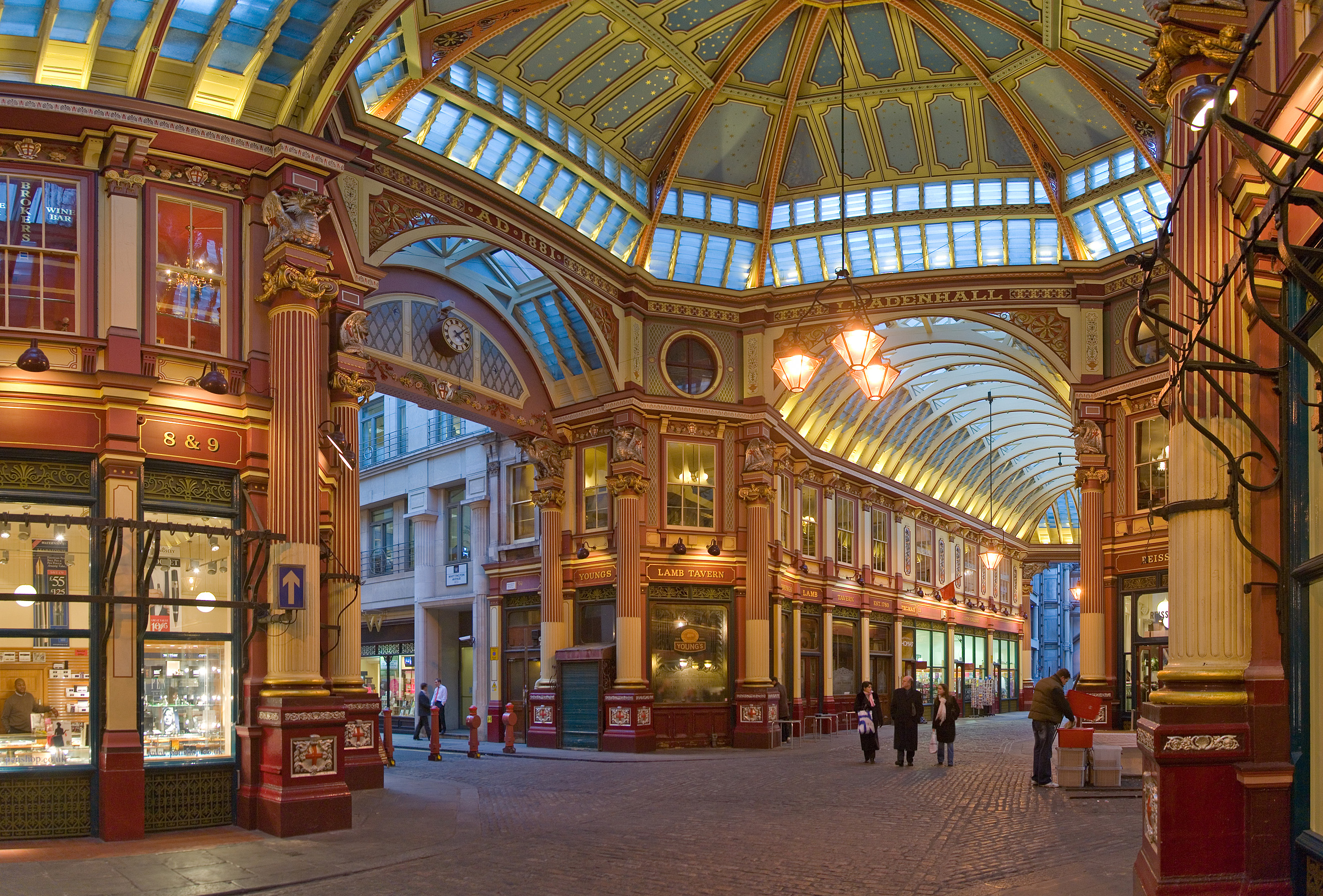
- The central interior of Leadenhall Market
- Location: City of London, England
- Coordinates: 51.5128°N 0.0835°W
- Address: Gracechurch Street, London EC3V 1LT
- Opened: 14th century
- Website: leadenhallmarket.co.uk

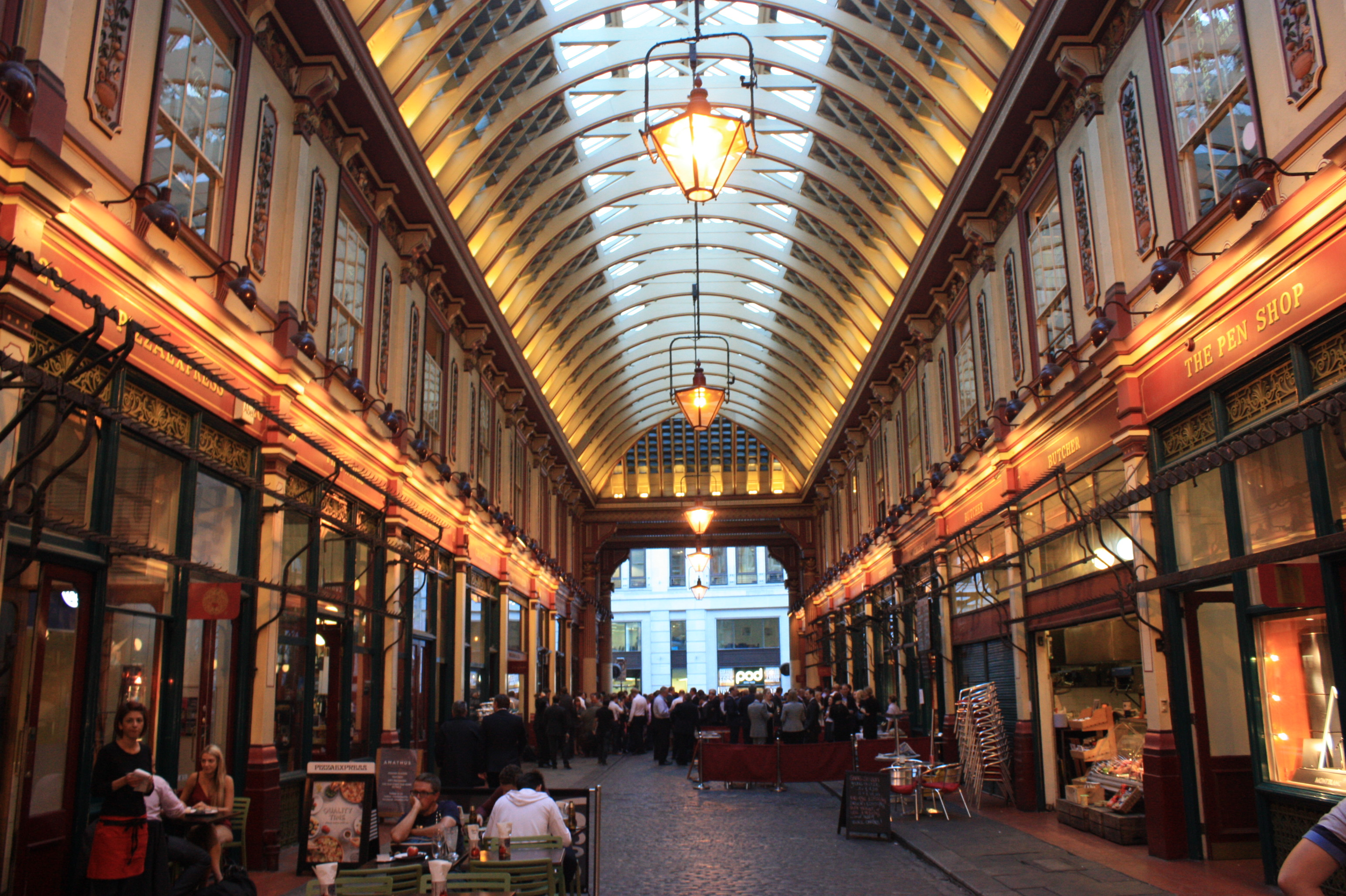
East Arcade of Leadenhall Market

Leadenhall Market is a covered market in London, England, located on Gracechurch Street. It is one of the oldest markets in London, dating from the 14th century, and is located in the historic centre of the City of London financial district.

== History ==
The market dates from the 14th century and is said to derive its name from Leather-hall, though this is disputed. The early history of Leaden Hall involves the Mayor (1446), Simon Eyre. According to John Stow, "Eyre, a draper built Leaden Hall for a common garner of corn for the use of this city".

The Market is typically open weekdays from 10 am until 6 pm, and primarily sells fresh food; among the vendors there are cheesemongers, butchers and florists. Originally a meat, game and poultry market, it stands on what was the centre of Roman London. A number of commercial retailers are also located in the market, including clothes shops. The Lamb Tavern, dating from 1780, is a traditional gathering place for insurance industry workers, many of whom work at Lloyd's of London adjacent to Leadenhall Market.

The ornate roof structure, painted green, maroon and cream, and cobbled floors of the current structure, designed in 1881 by Sir Horace Jones (who was also the architect of Billingsgate and Smithfield Markets), make Leadenhall Market a tourist attraction.

The main entrance to the market is on Gracechurch Street. The double height entrance is flanked by tall, narrow gabled red brick and Portland stone blocks in a 17th-century Dutch style. The adjacent buildings to the south have a continuous retail frontage which is punctuated by narrow entrances to pedestrian ways into the market.

Between 1990 and 1991 the market received a dramatic redecoration which improved its appearance, enhancing its architectural character and detail. The redecoration scheme received a special mention in the Civic Trust Awards in 1994. The market is a Grade II* listed building, being listed in 1972.

It was used to represent the area of London near the Leaky Cauldron and Diagon Alley in the film Harry Potter and the Philosopher's Stone (2001) and is featured in the films The Imaginarium of Doctor Parnassus (2009), Hereafter (2010), Brannigan (1975), Hidden City (1987), Johnny English (2003) and Love Aaj Kal (2009). It was also used in the music video for the 1991 Erasure song "Love to Hate You".

Leadenhall Market formed part of the marathon course of the 2012 Olympic Games; runners passed through the market from Whittington Avenue to Lime Street. Furthermore, it is featured in Mario Kart Tour and Mario Kart 8 Deluxe as part of the London Loop Course.

The nearest public transport access points are Bank and Monument stations on the London Underground, and Fenchurch Street or Cannon Street on National Rail. Vehicular access is also available via Whittington Avenue to the north and Lime Street to the south and east, and there is additional pedestrian access via a number of narrow passageways.

== Gallery ==
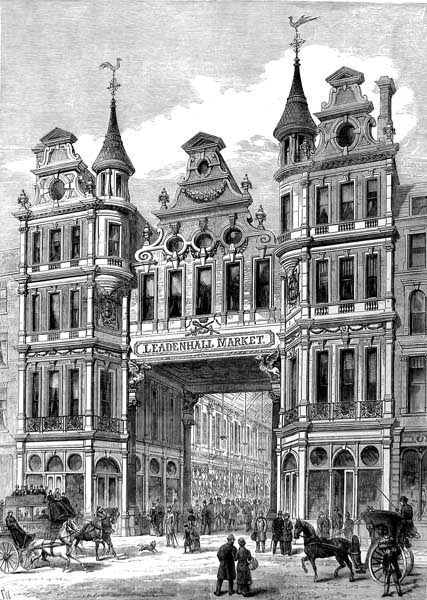
Main entrance, from the Illustrated London News, 1881

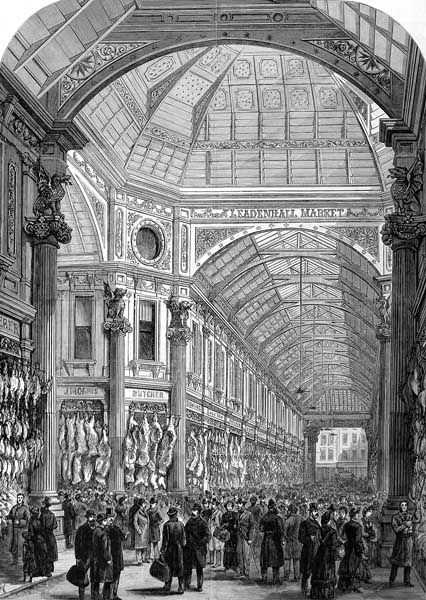
The interior, from the Illustrated London News, 1881

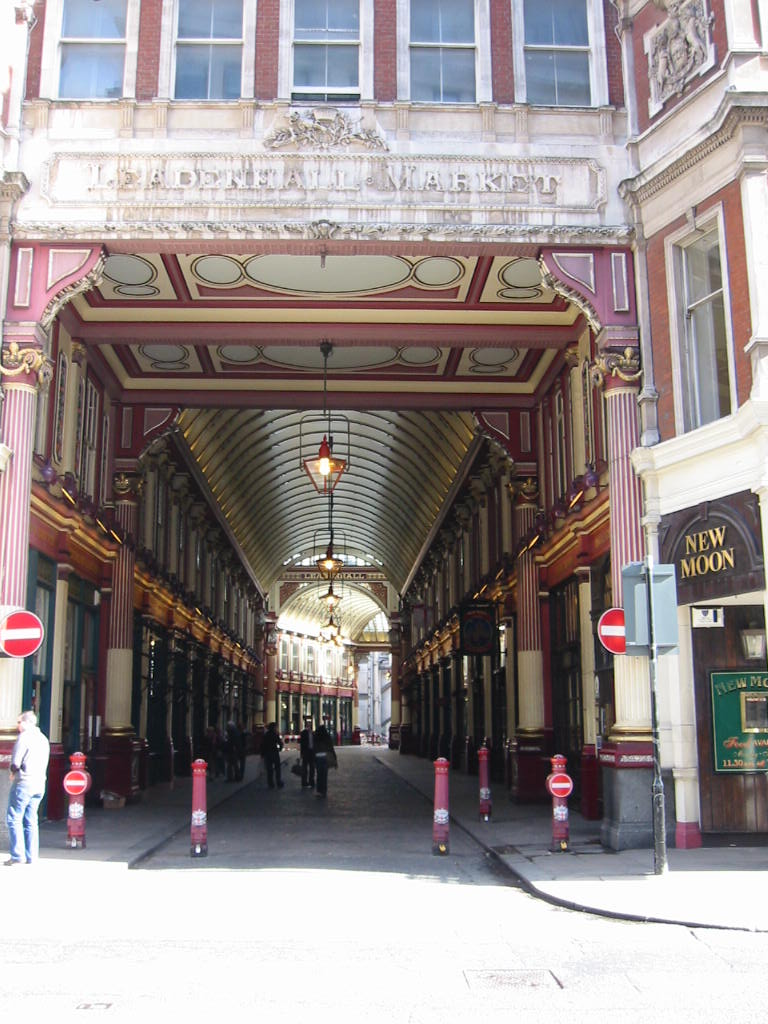
West entrance, from Gracechurch Street

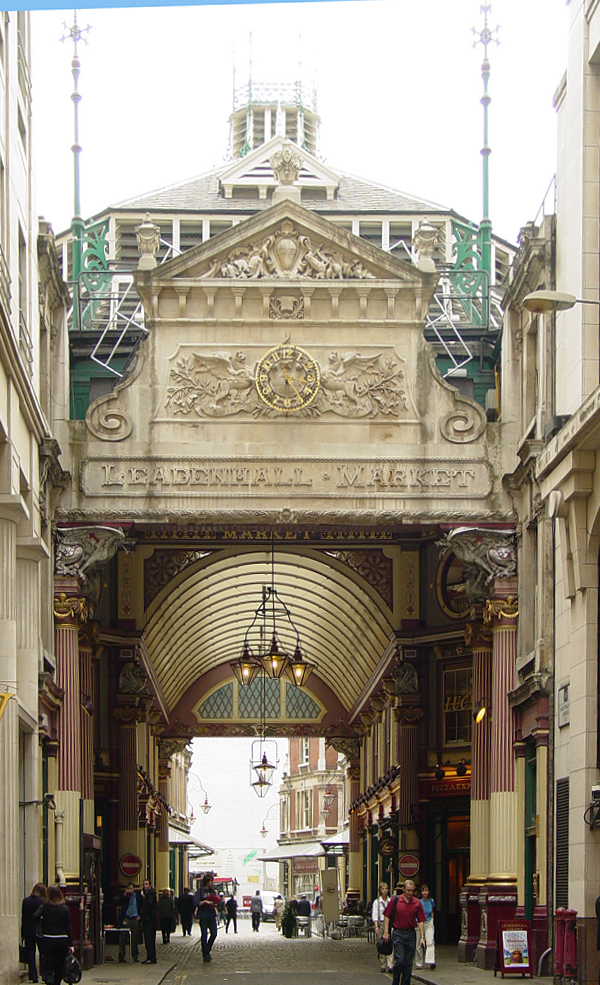
North entrance, from Whittington Avenue off Leadenhall Street

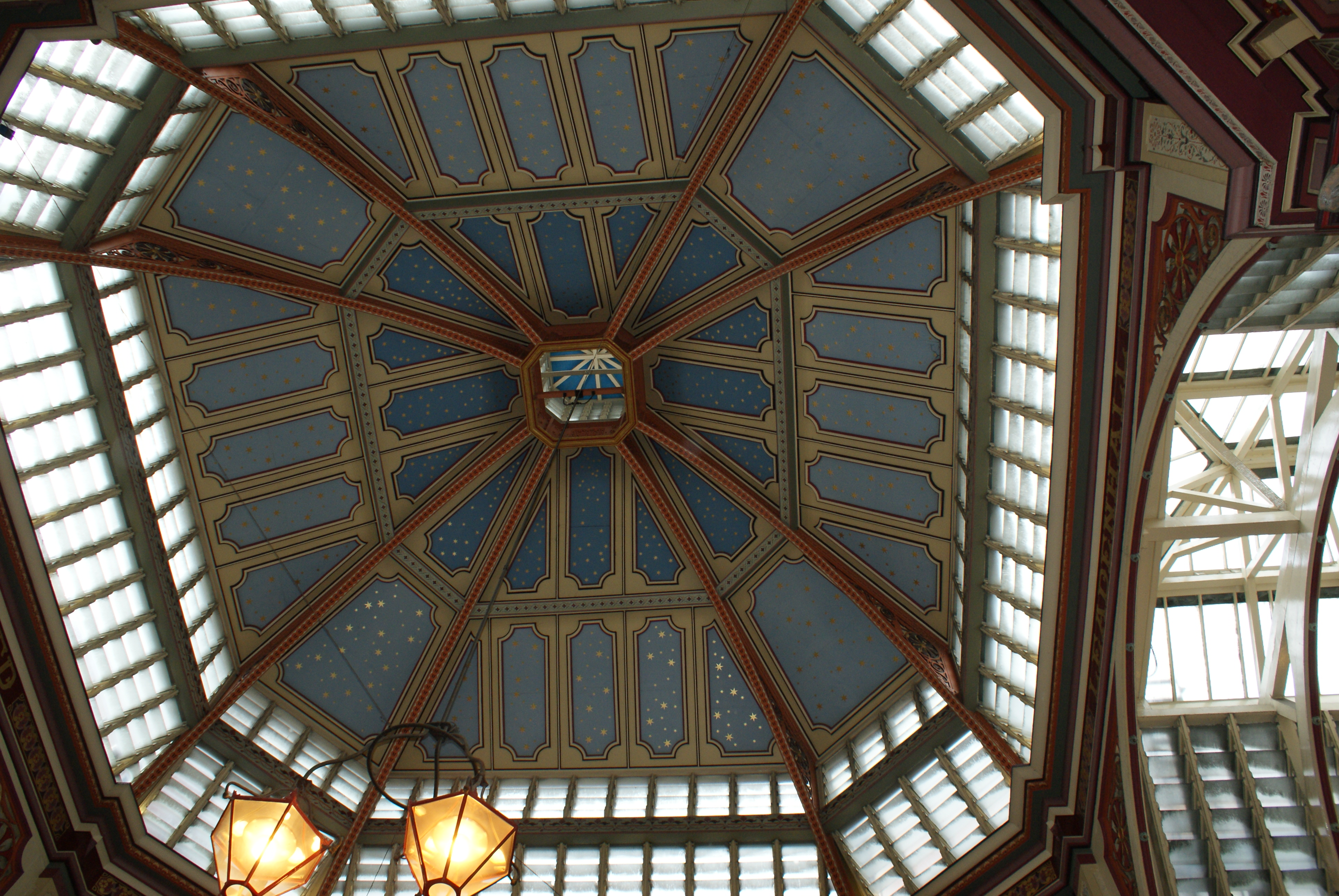
Market ceiling, 2010

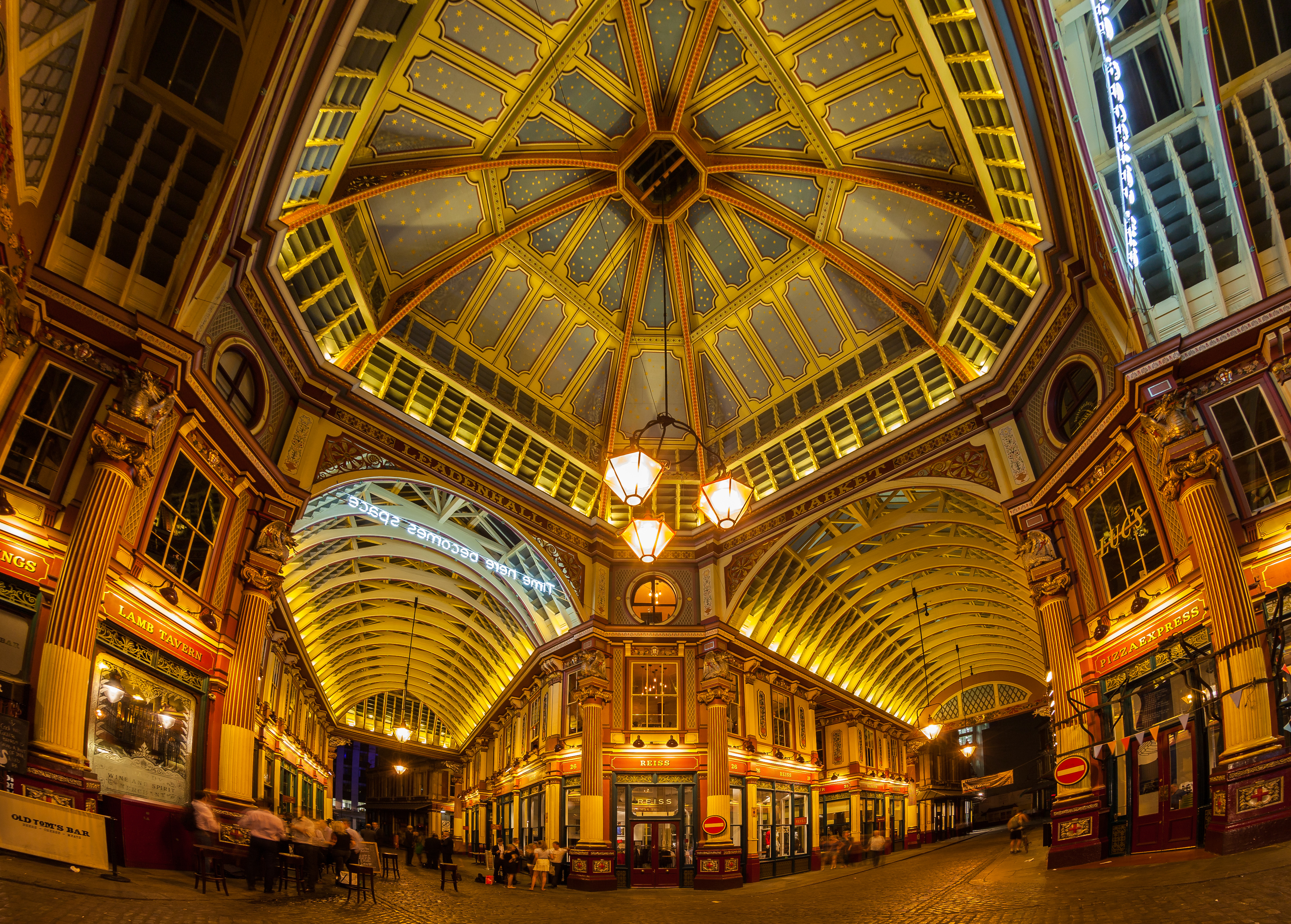
Night view using a fish-eye lens

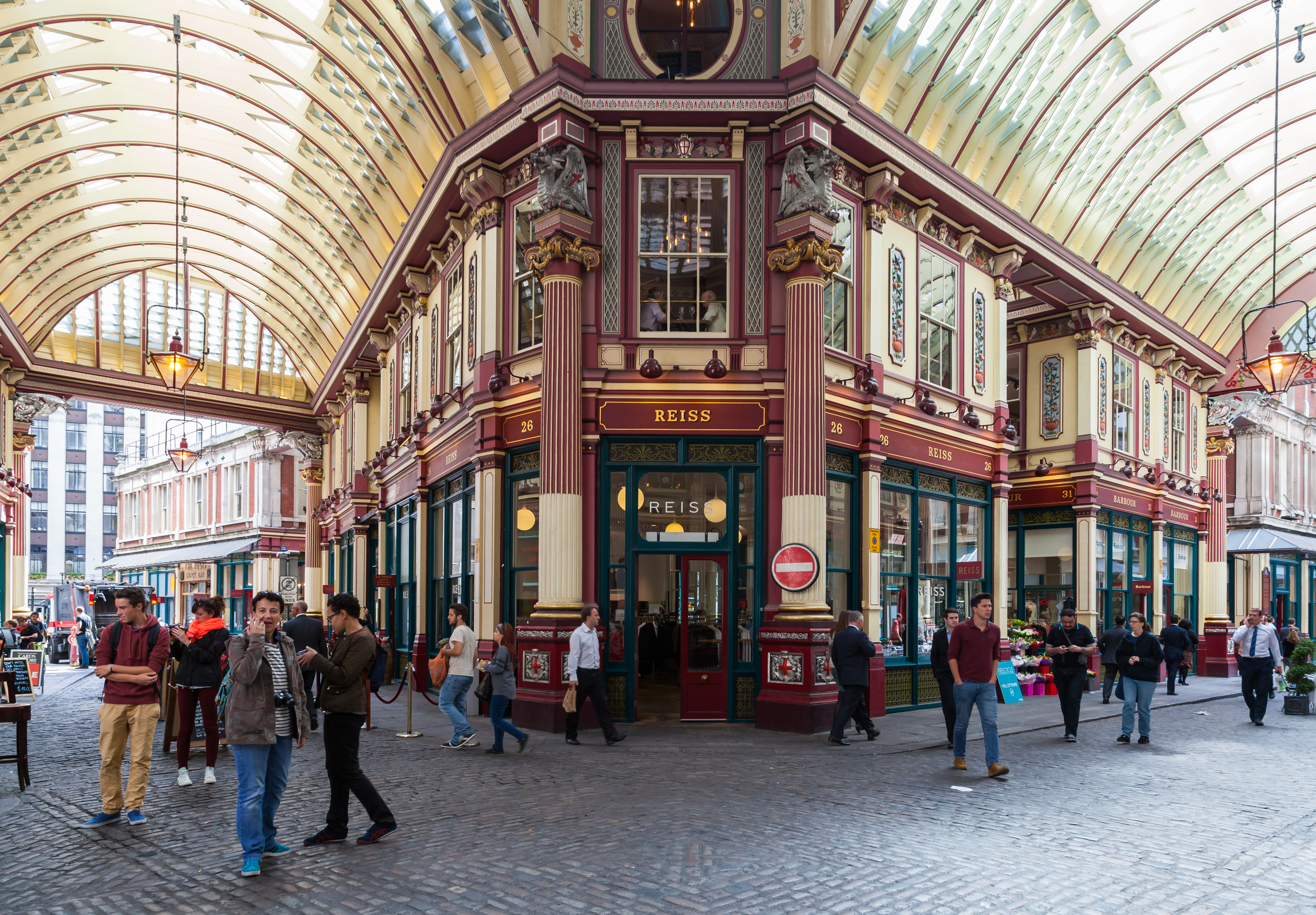
View during the day

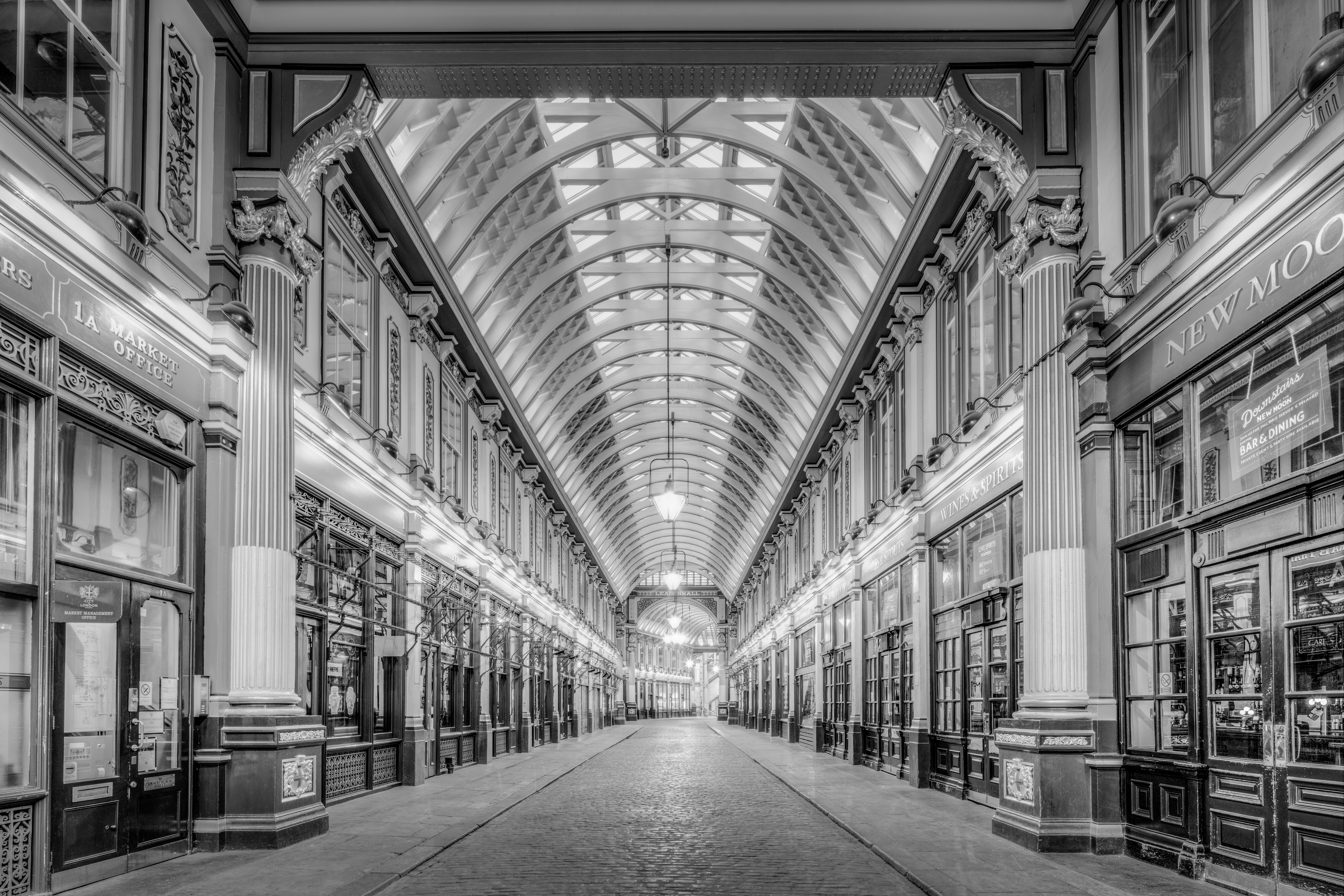
Black and white interior of Leadenhall Market

== See also ==
- List of markets in London
