= Fen Court =

Short pedestrian passageway in the City of London

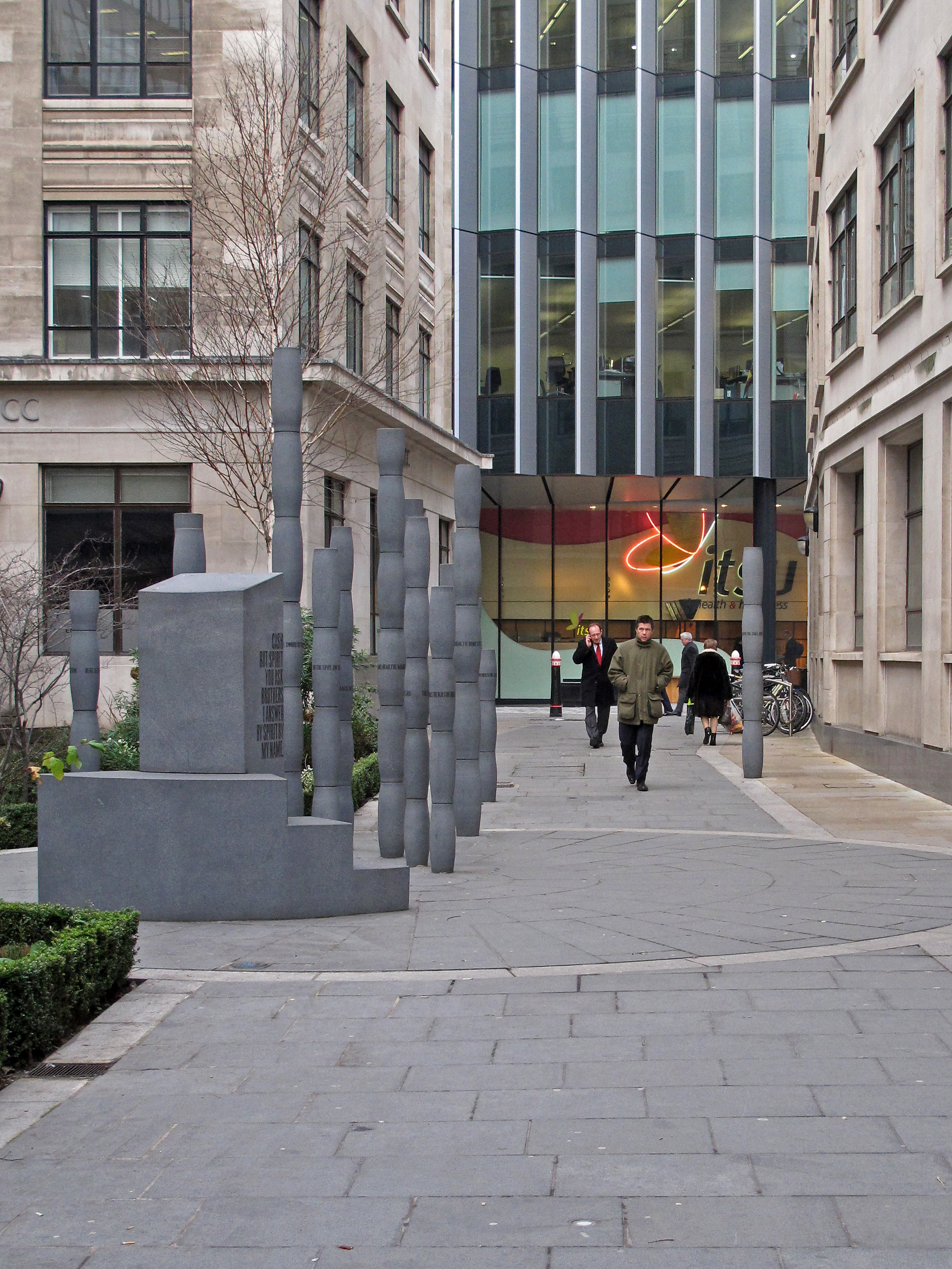
- Fen Court and 'The Gilt of Cain' sculpture
- Interactive map of Fen Court
- Length: 80 m (260 ft)
- Location: London, United Kingdom
- Postal code: EC3
- Nearest Tube station: Monument
- Coordinates: 51.5121°N 0.0815°W
- South end: Fenchurch Street
- To: Fenchurch Avenue

Fen Court is a short pedestrian passageway in the City of London, England, linking Fenchurch Street to Fenchurch Avenue.

== Fen Court garden ==
At the middle of the passageway is Fen Court garden, which was re-landscaped in 2008. It is close to the site of an earlier St Mary Woolnoth church, where the reverend John Newton delivered many anti-slavery sermons. A sculpture 'The Gilt of Cain', by Michael Visocchi, featuring text by Lemn Sissay was unveiled in the park by Archbishop Desmond Tutu to commemorate the abolition of the transatlantic slave trade. The London Centre for Spiritual Direction has a small circular labyrinth laid out in the garden.

The garden is on the site of the churchyard of St Gabriel Fenchurch, burnt down in the Great Fire of London in 1666.

== One Fen Court ==
In 2019, a mixed use building of 15 storeys built by Generali Real Estate with Eric Parry Architects, called One Fen Court or 120 Fenchurch Street, opened alongside the east side of Fen Court. The building has a publicly accessible roof garden named The Garden at 120, and is 69 metres (226 ft) high. A pedestrian route parallel to Fen Court runs through an undercroft in One Fen Court, with a ceiling-mounted public artwork.
