= St Gabriel Fenchurch =

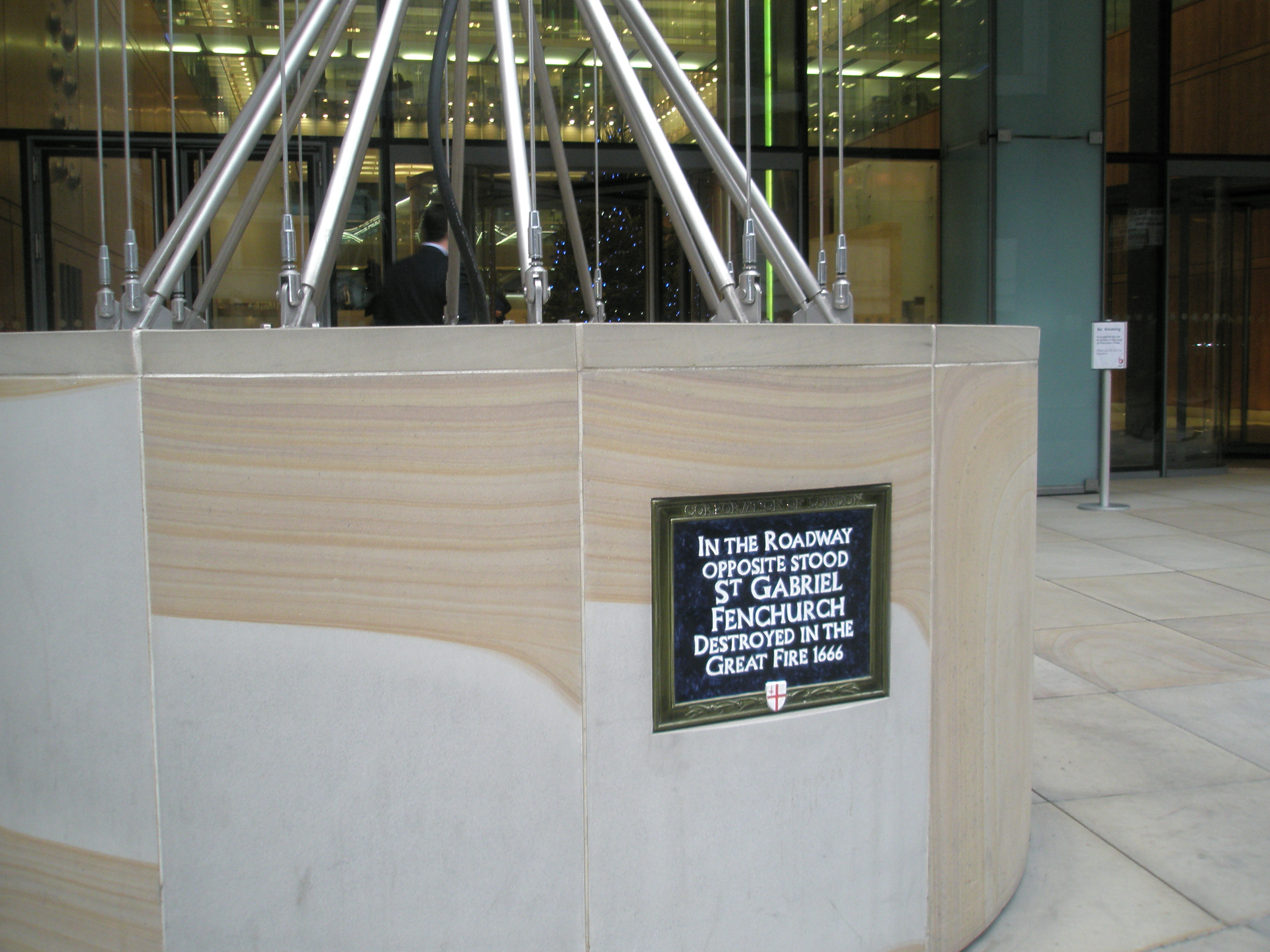
- Plaque opposite Cullum Street
- St Gabriel Fenchurch
- 51°30′39″N 0°4′54″W
- Location: Fenchurch Street, London
- Country: England
- Denomination: Anglican

Architecture
- Years built: 12th century
- Demolished: 1666

St Gabriel Fenchurch (or Fen Church as recorded on the Ordnance Survey) was a parish church in the Langbourn Ward of the City of London, destroyed in the Great Fire of London and not rebuilt.

== History ==
The church stood between Rood Lane and Mincing Lane, with the churchyard extending north beyond present day Fenchurch Street to Fen Court.

At the beginning of the 17th century, John Stow wrote in his description of Fenchurch Street: "In the midst of this street standeth a small parish church called St Gabriel Fen Church, corruptly Fan church". The dedication to St Gabriel is first recorded in 1517. Before that it had been known as St Mary's. Richard Newcourt wrote:

...this Church hath all along in the London Registry been recorded by the Name of S. Mary Fencherch, till the Year 1517. for then is the first time I find it there call'd by the Name of S. Gabriel Fencherch; and the next Year after All Saints Fencherch; whence, I conjecture, it may, probably, be dedicated to the Blessed Virgin Mary, to the Holy Angel Gabriel, and to All Saints.

The church was lengthened by nine feet in 1631. This and other improvements were done at a cost to the parish of £587 10s. Thomas Clark, a glazier, gave the church an east window, with the Royal Arms and the motto "Touch Not Mine Anointed".

Along with the majority of the parish churches in the City, St Gabriel's was destroyed by the Great Fire in 1666. A Rebuilding Act was passed in 1670 and a committee set up under Sir Christopher Wren. It decided to rebuild 51 of the churches, but St Gabriel's was not among them. Instead the parish was united to that of St Margaret Pattens, although its land holding was not finally resolved until 13 years later, and charitable bequests continued to be made using the old name. The land on which the church had stood was incorporated into the roadway, but part of the churchyard survived in Fen Court.

Notable tombs in the church included that of Benedict Spinola, the Genoese Elizabethan banker.
