= Cannon Street =

Street in London

Coordinates: 51°30′43″N 0°5′31″W

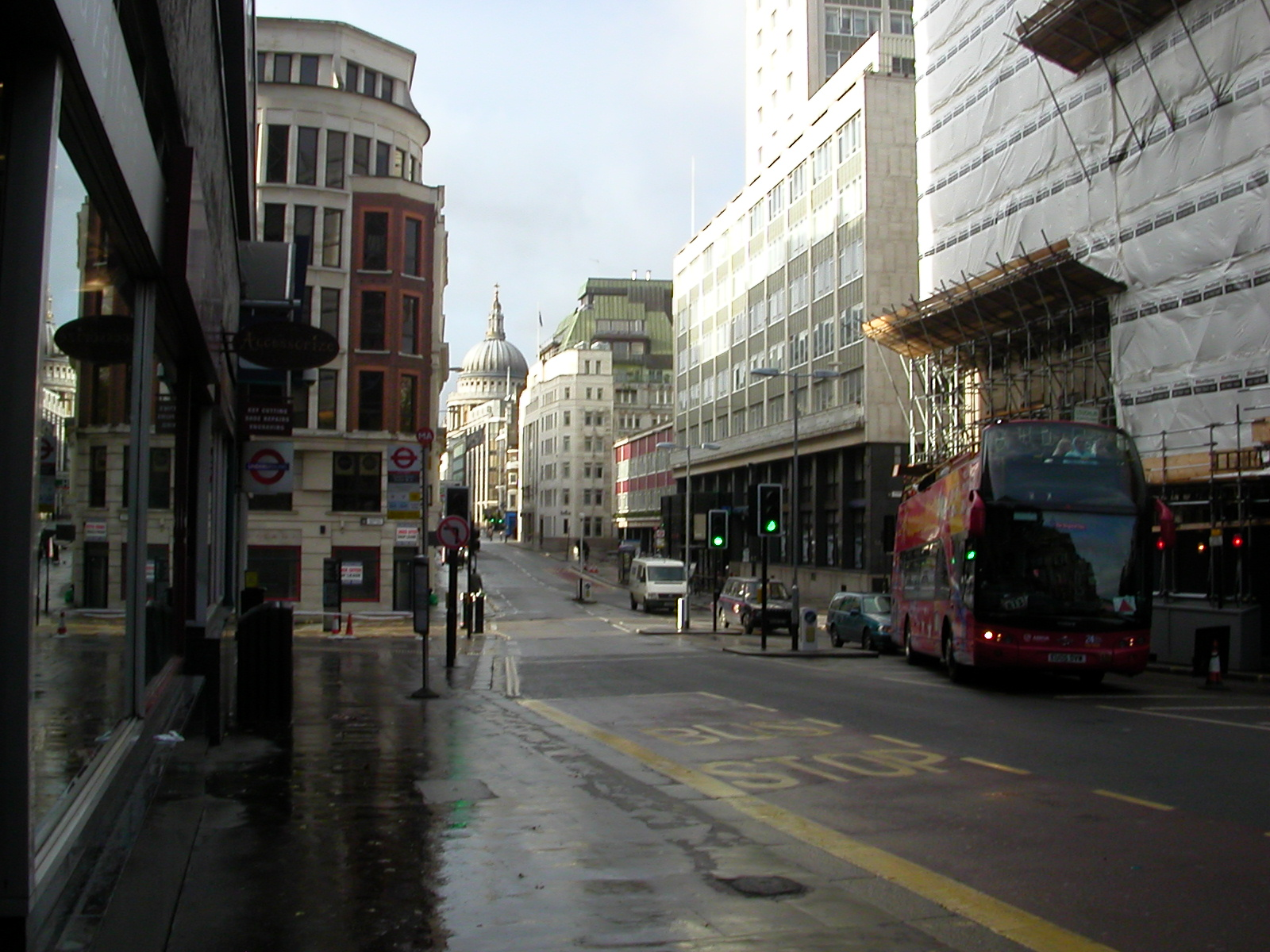
- Looking west towards St. Paul's Cathedral, close to the entrance to Cannon Street station (2006)
- Interactive map of Cannon Street
- Former names: Candelwrichstrete, Candlewick Street, Canwick Street, Cannik Street, Cannin Street
- Length: 0.5 mi (0.80 km)
- Location: London, United Kingdom
- Postal code: EC4
- Nearest train station: Cannon Street; Mansion House
- East end: King William Street
- West end: St. Paul's Churchyard

Cannon Street is a road in the City of London, the historic nucleus of London and its modern financial centre. It runs roughly parallel with the River Thames, about 250 metres (820 ft) north of it, in the south of the City.

It is the site of the ancient London Stone and gave its name to Cannon Street station, a mainline railway terminus and connected London Underground station.

== Etymology ==
The area around Cannon Street was initially the place of residence of the candle-makers. The name first appears as Candelwrichstrete (i.e. "Candlewright Street") in 1190. The name was shortened over 60 times as a result of the local cockney dialect and settled on Cannon Street in the 17th century, and is therefore not related to the firearms. The ward of Candlewick is named after the street.

A Cannon Street in Birmingham, according to the archives of Birmingham Central Library, is named after the London street.

Candleriggs, a street in Glasgow, has a name of the same origin and meaning.

== Overview ==
In the west, Cannon Street starts at St Paul's Churchyard outside St Paul's Cathedral; running east it meets Queen Victoria Street near Mansion House Underground station, passing Cannon Street station, and finally meets King William Street and Gracechurch Street near Monument tube station.

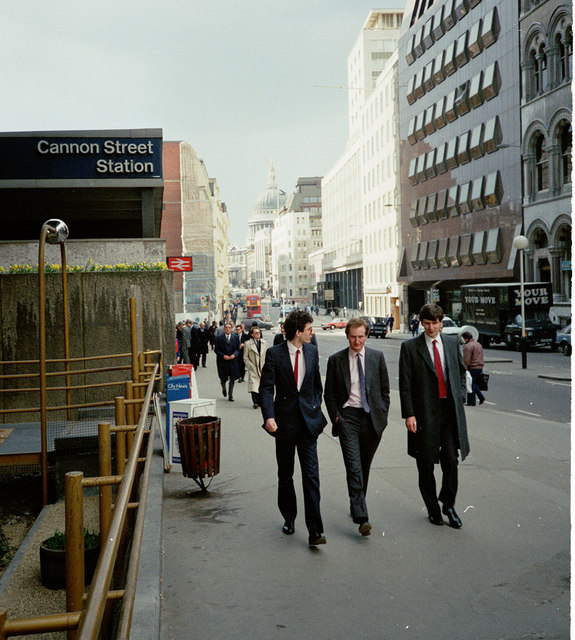
Cannon Street pictured in 1987. View westward toward St Paul's.

In the late 19th century Cannon Street was occupied by large wholesale warehouses, especially of cotton goods and other fabrics.

London Stone, a historic landmark of uncertain origin, was originally situated in the middle of Cannon Street, opposite St Swithin's Church. It was later set into the wall of the church, and now rests in a Portland stone casing on the north side of the street, opposite Cannon Street station.

The Roman praetorium, or "governor's palace", may also have been located in this area, between the principal street of Roman Londinium and the River Thames. The remains of a very large high status building were found with a garden, water pools and several large halls, some of them decorated with mosaic floors. The plan of the building is only partly preserved, but was erected in the second part of the 1st century and was in use until around 300, rebuilt and renovated several times.

Singer Marc Almond suffered a near-fatal crash in this street in 2004, whilst riding pillion on a motorcycle.

Where Queen Street crosses Cannon Street there is a pedestrian-priority "Central Plaza" area. This was part of an award-winning public realm improvement scheme undertaken in 2006.

Cannon Street formed part of the marathon course of the 2012 Olympic and Paralympic Games.

Cannon Street has eight pubs (as of 2012) in and around the area which is one of the largest concentrations in the City of London.

Cannon Street also appeared in scene VI of William Shakespeare's Henry IV, Part 2.

== Transport links ==
Cannon Street station is served by the District and Circle lines on the London Underground and also by Southeastern mainline rail services. The street is also the location of Mansion House tube station, also on the District and Circle lines, and of one of the entrances to Bank station, on the Central, Northern and Waterloo & City lines and the Docklands Light Railway.

London Buses routes 15, 17, 521 and night routes N15 and N199 serve Cannon Street.

== See also ==
- A. & G. Taylor – photographic business, opened on Cannon Street in 1866
