= A. & G. Taylor =

British photographic business

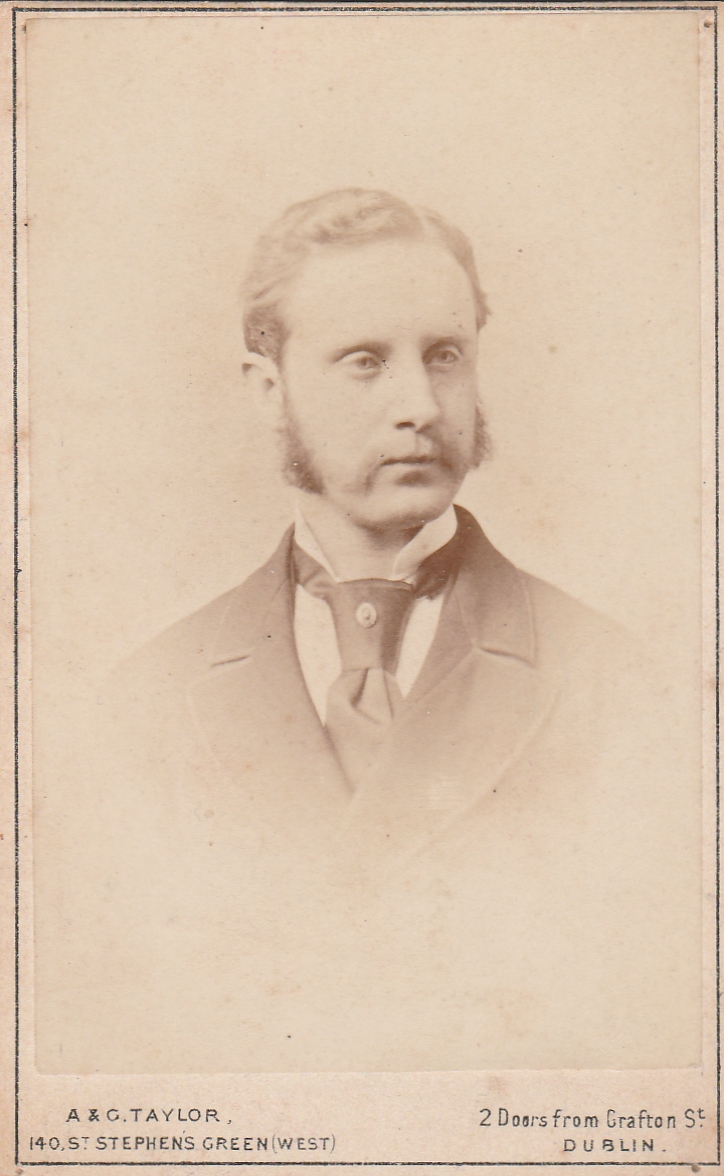
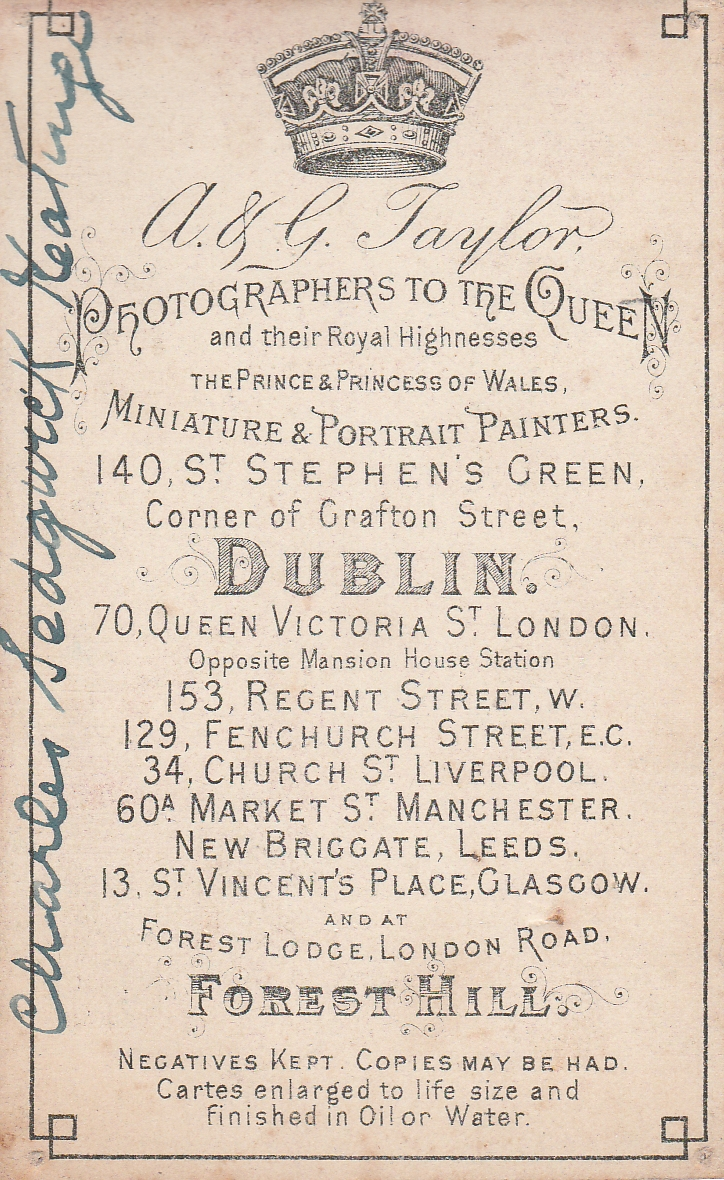
The front and reverse of a cabinet card produced at the Dublin branch of the company circa 1890s

A. & G. Taylor was a British photographic business, and manufacturer of cabinet cards and cartes de visite, and later picture postcards.

In 1866, the photographers Andrew Taylor (1832–1909) and George Taylor opened their first studio in London's Cannon Street. They expanded to have 30 outlets in major British cities and some in the US. In 1886, they received a Royal Warrant, and became self-proclaimed "Photographers to the Queen".

By 1901, they were producing picture postcards, using four different series, the Reality Series of greetings, children, actresses, and military themes, as real photo postcards, the Carbontone Series of black and white printed views and greetings, the Orthochrome Series of views and greetings, printed in tinted halftone, and a Comic Series. After 1914, they moved their main studio to Hastings, but may have closed by 1918.
