= Gracechurch Street =

Main road in the City of London

- A1213
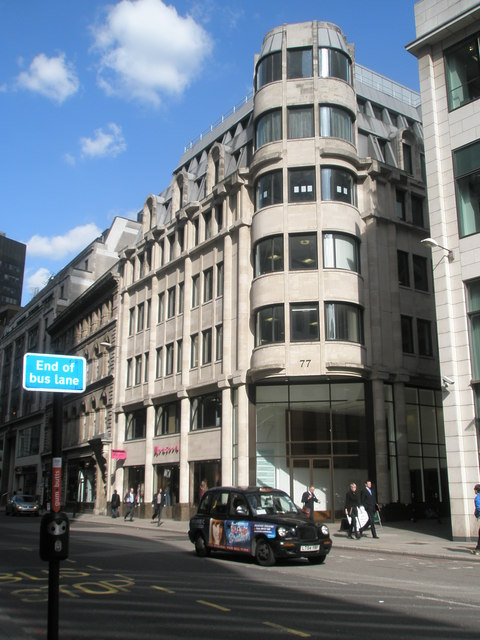
- 77 Gracechurch Street
- Interactive map of Gracechurch Street
- Length: 0.2 mi (0.32 km)
- Location: City of London
- Postal code: EC3
- Nearest Tube station: Monument
- north end: Cornhill; 51.5133°N 0.0841°W
- south end: Eastcheap; 51.5109°N 0.0859°W

Gracechurch Street is a main road in the City of London, the historic and financial centre of London, England, which is designated the A1213.

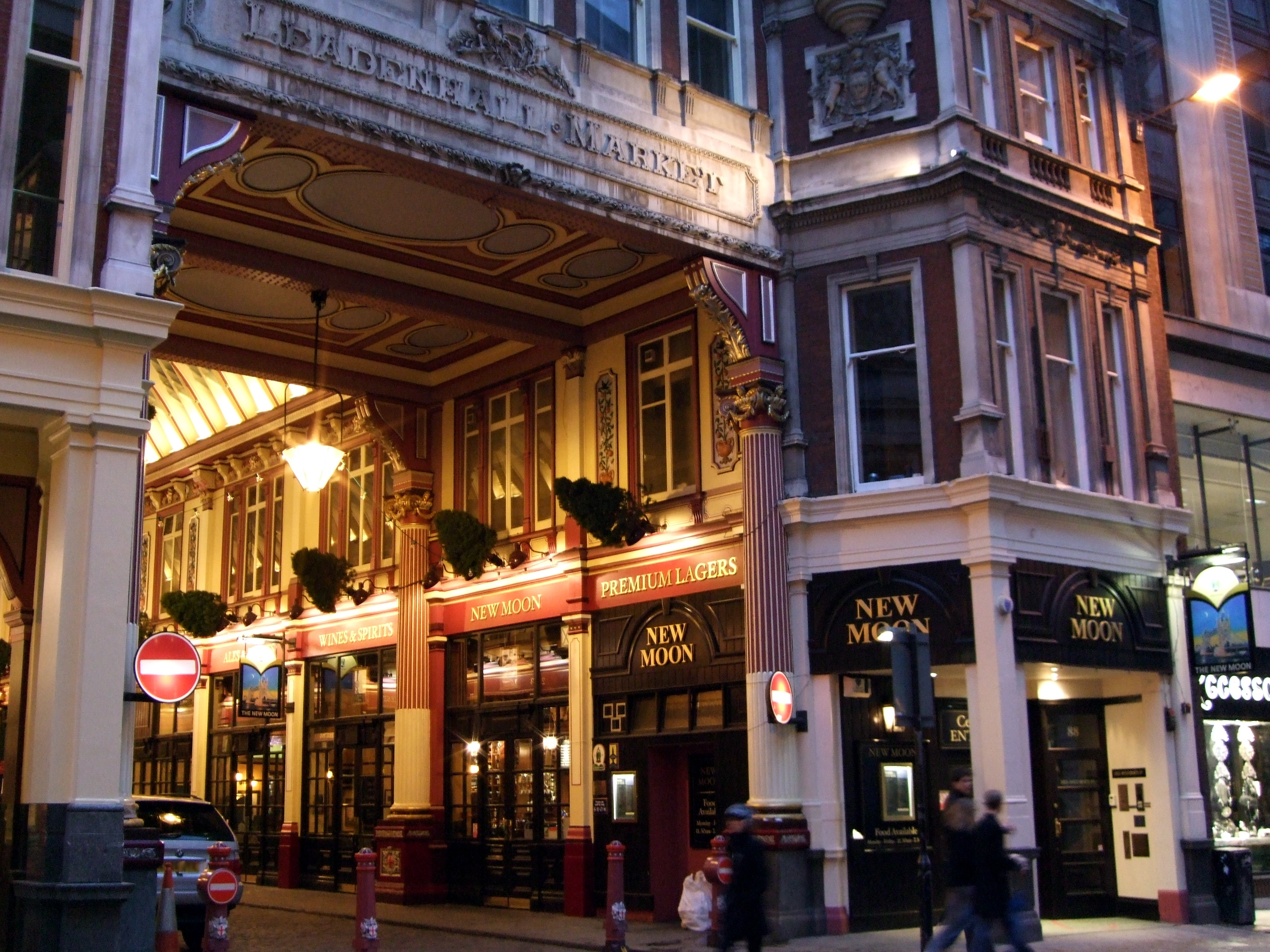
The Gracechurch Street exit of Leadenhall Market.

It is home to a number of shops, restaurants, and offices and has an entrance to Leadenhall Market, a covered market dating from the 14th century.

== Overview ==
At its southern end, the street begins near Christopher Wren's Monument to the Great Fire of London, at a junction with King William Street, Eastcheap and Cannon Street. Heading north, it crosses Lombard Street and Fenchurch Street, and continues forward into Bishopsgate, which marks the start of the A10 route to King's Lynn.

Leadenhall Market, a covered market dating from the 14th century and a Grade II* listed structure since 1972, is the street's most famous attraction.

The closest mainline railway station is Fenchurch Street and the nearest London Underground station is Monument. The postcode for the street is EC3V.

== History ==
The word 'Gracechurch' derives from Garscherchestrete, Gres-cherch and Gras-cherche, with 'Gracechurch' not used until after the destruction of the street in the Great Fire of London in 1666. The street is in the heart of Roman Londinium; it runs directly over the site of the basilica and forum. Some of the former has been unearthed in 2025 as part of work to remodel an office block (which will now be redesigned to accommodate the preservation of the ruins).

In medieval times a corn market was held by St Benet Gracechurch (a church destroyed in the Great Fire) at the junction with Lombard Street, with vendors directed to sell their wares there. The existence of such markets can be seen from the derivation of their names, gaers or gers meaning a blade of grass or herb and faenum meaning hay.

The Religious Society of Friends (Quakers) once had a meeting house on Gracechurch Street. William Penn was arrested on 14 August 1670 for delivering a sermon in the street in front of the building after having been forbidden to preach indoors. It was burnt down in 1821 but later rebuilt. Many of its members had already moved to Stoke Newington, a couple of miles north along more or less the same street. The world's first school bus was set up to run between Newington Academy for Girls, a Quaker school set up there in 1824, and Gracechurch Street Meeting House. For a time it "became one of the most important Quaker Meetings, and the neighbourhood around it became the centre of the Quaker business community in the city. By the 18th century 20-25% of the immediate population were Quakers. City Friends mingled piety with prosperity and earned reputations as sober, honest tradesmen."

During its long history, the street was for a period named Gracious Street.

Gracechurch Street formed part of the marathon course of the 2012 Olympic and Paralympic Games. The women's Olympic marathon took place on 5 August 2012 and the men's on 12 August. The Paralympic marathons were held on 9 September.

== Cultural impact ==
Gracechurch Street is mentioned in Jane Austen's Pride and Prejudice as being the home of Mr. and Mrs. Gardiner, the uncle and aunt of the five Bennet sisters. The former Swan-with-Two-Necks inn is the scene of Estella's meeting with Pip in Charles Dickens' Great Expectations.

The street has lent its name to the Gracechurch Shopping Centre in Sutton Coldfield, which was named after the street by the property company based in Gracechurch Street responsible for its creation.
