= Benedict Spinola =

Italian merchant (died 1580)

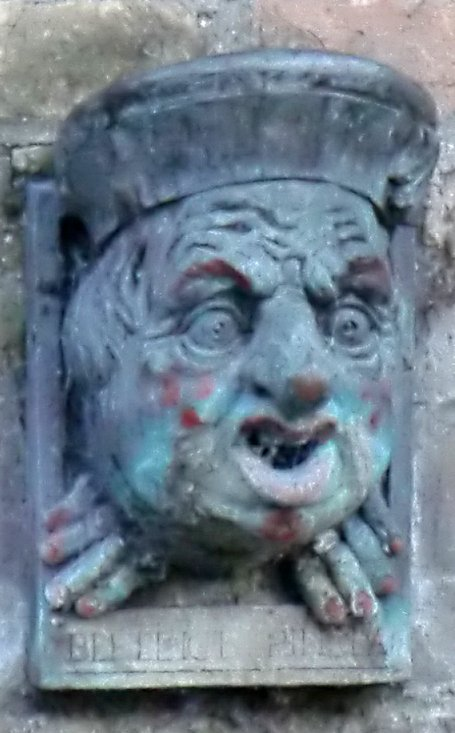
Gargoyle of Spinola at Magdalene College, Cambridge

Benedict Spinola (1519/20 – 1580), born in Genoa and died in London, was a 16th-century Genoese merchant of the Spinola family who lived his whole adult life in the City of London, the principal seaport of the Kingdom of England. Beginning his career as a clerk, he rose to become an exporter of woollen cloths and importer of wines and also served the English government as an agent and financier.

He never married and died of the plague in London in August 1580, shortly after his return from a mission to the Seventeen Provinces.

== Life ==
Born at Genoa, Spinola, also called Benedick Spinola, and in Italian Benedetto Spinola, was the second son of Battista Spinola by his marriage to a cousin, Elisabetta, a daughter of Giacomo Spinola. The family was an important one in the city, and in 1556 Spinola's father declined election as Doge.

Little is known of Spinola's early life, but by 1541 he was in London working as a clerk at a salary of two pounds a year for Bastian Bony, postmaster to the City of London's foreign merchants. Spinola lived his whole adult life in the parish of St Gabriel Fenchurch, latterly joined there by his nephews Hannibal and Ascaneo Spinola. He never married and had a property in Shoreditch known as "Spinola's pleasure".

Unusually for a foreigner, Spinola was fully naturalised in 1552, which gave him the right to pay taxes and customs dues at the rates applied to the English. In 1559 he was an exporter of woollen cloths and an importer of wines. In 1561, he confessed to exporting another trader's goods on his own licence:

"27th Dec. 1561. I doo confess that I have entred in the customs' book at London, and shipped out of this realme in my owne name, and uppon my licence, the number of foore hundred forty-foore karseys, which wer the proper goods of Ihon Justiniano of Cio, stranger. For the which I have payd to the Queene's Majestie's use but Englishmen's customs, according to my licence : and have receaved of the sayd Justinian such custom as strangers doo paye to her highness for karseys; abatyng to hym (by agreement betwixt us) viij c vppon every carsey. Per me BENEDETTO SPINOLA."

Despite this, in 1566 he was granted the right to do just the same within his licence. He traded with his three brothers who lived in Antwerp, Giacomo, Francisco, and Pasquale Spinola, and at home in London was an important merchant. When the Earl of Leicester wanted hangings for Kenilworth Castle, his man of business was instructed to deal with Spinola, who could "get such stuff better cheap than any man", and in 1572 Leicester wrote to Francis Walsingham that Spinola was "my dear friend and the best Italian I know in England".

About 1550, Spinola was unhappy that the minister of the Calvinist Italian church in London, Michelangelo Florio was preaching against Papists, but in 1566 the ambassador of Spain in London reported home that Spinola had joined the Church of England, and in 1568 Spinola and his household were attending services at their local parish church. He became an adviser to the English government, gathering intelligence from correspondents overseas and negotiating financial questions, and by the 1570s was dealing in huge sums of money.

In 1568, Huguenot raiders forced ships into English ports which were carrying silver lent by Genoese merchants to be used for paying the troops of the Duke of Alba. For security, the silver was brought ashore, and Spinola acted for the English government in repaying the Genoese.

At a heralds' visitation of London in 1568, Spinola showed a certificate from the 'Seigniory of Genoa' to the effect that he was the lawful son of Baptiste Spinola "who bare these Arms abovesaide", and another from the Earl of Bedford, who certified that he had been in Genoa in 1566 and that in that year "the said Babtiste", Spinola's father, "did refuse to be Duke of the same Citie".

In 1568, in the letters patent of Elizabeth I which established a new joint stock company called the Society of Mines Royal, Spinola is named as one of the principals of the Society, together with the Earl of Pembroke, the Earl of Leicester, Lord Mountjoy, Lionel Duckett, and others. In 1571, Spinola and Lionel Duckett between them made a loan to Queen Elizabeth I of £4,100. In 1578 Spinola acted as agent for an English loan to the Union of Brussels.

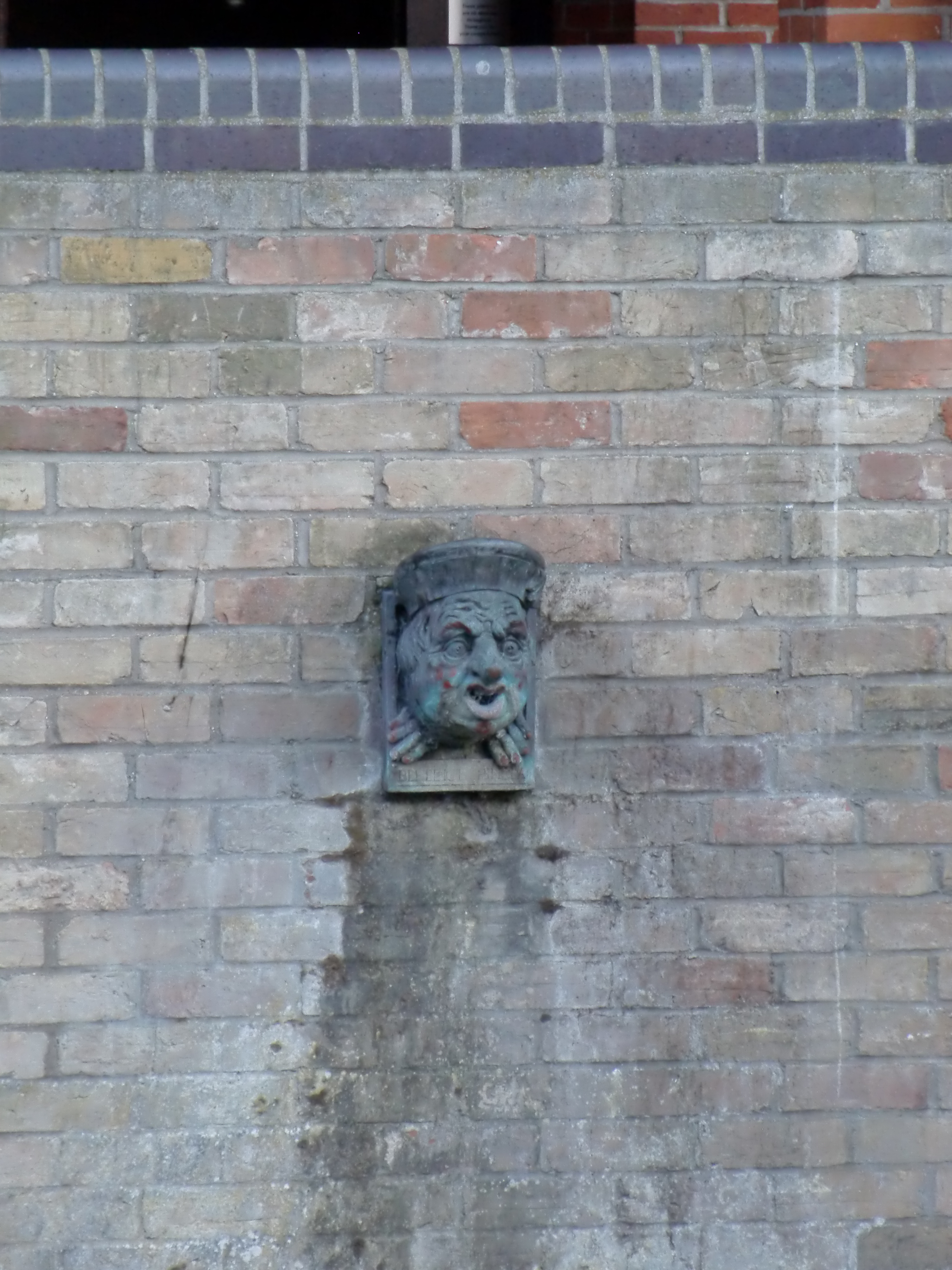
The gargoyle in context at Magdalene

On 15 June 1580, Spinola sold a tenement and 7 acres (28,000 m^{2}) in the parish of St Botolph's Aldgate, London, to the Earl of Oxford, for £2,500. The land was called the Great Garden of Christchurch and had previously belonged to Magdalene College, Cambridge. Magdalene College, which considered that it had been cheated, pursued legal actions unsuccessfully, and more than four hundred years later in 1989, it avenged itself by erecting a gargoyle representing Spinola, designed by Peter Fluck and Roger Law, the creators of Spitting Image.

On 6 July 1580, after returning from a financial mission to the Netherlands, Spinola made a will in Italian, stating that he was infirm. On 15 August he died of the plague and was entombed in the choir of St Gabriel Fenchurch. The church was destroyed in the Great Fire of London and not rebuilt.
