= Short course prevention factor =

The short course prevention factor (SCPF) is a multiplicative factor or coefficient used in the sport of athletics, specifically road running, to increase the probability that the measured length of a course is at least as long as the desired length of the course. World Athletics, the international governing body for athletics, as well as USA Track & Field, the national governing body for the United States, specify the numerical factor of the SCPF to be 1.001. The SCPF has important implications when verifying world record performances.

However, just because the SCPF has been added to the measurement calculation, that does not mean that a 10k course is 10,010 meters in length. It can be longer or shorter. The SCPF is designed to increase the probability that, in spite of wobble of the bicycle used for measuring, or small curves to avoid potholes or other obstructions, the course will still be at least as long as the advertised distance. All certified 10k courses should be longer than 10,000 meters, but will normally be less than 10,010 meters, depending on the measurer, and obstructions/hazards present during measurement.

The SCPF applies to courses measured by a bicycle and does not apply to measurements made with a steel tape or with an electronic measuring device.

== See also ==
- Jones Counter
