= Fenchurch Street =

Street in the City of London

Coordinates: 51°30′43″N 0°4′50.8″W

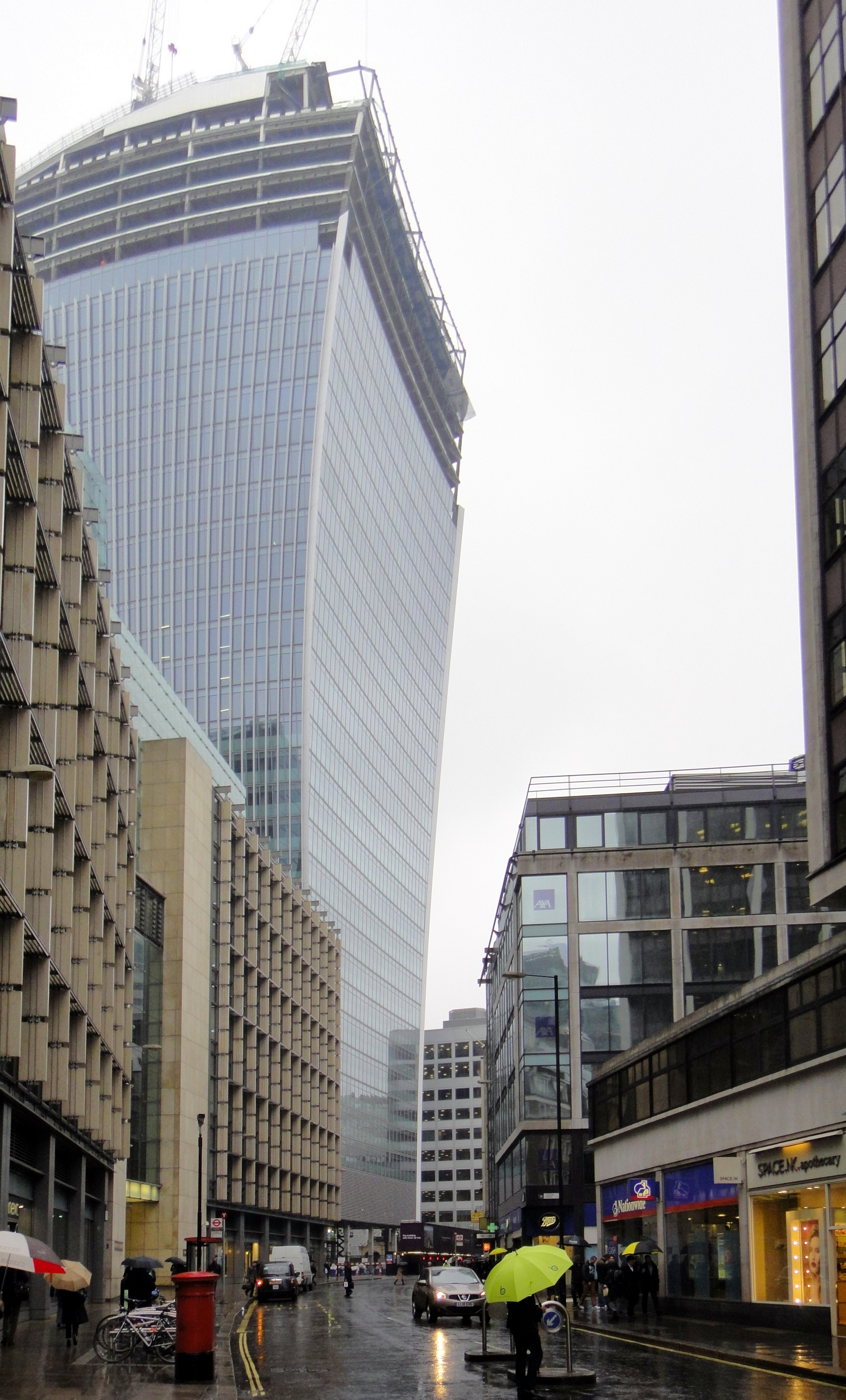
Midway down Fenchurch Street, looking west. 20 Fenchurch Street is under construction

Fenchurch Street is a street in London, England, linking Aldgate at its eastern end with Lombard Street and Gracechurch Street in the west. It is a well-known thoroughfare in the City of London financial district and is the site of many corporate offices and headquarters. The name "Fenchurch" means "church in the fenny or marshy ground" and presumably refers to St Gabriel Fenchurch, which stood at the junction of Fenchurch Street and Cullum Street until it was destroyed by the Great Fire.

To the south of Fenchurch Street and towards its eastern end is Fenchurch Street railway station, a mainline terminus with services towards east London and Essex. Other notable sites include the commercial buildings at 20 Fenchurch Street and 30 Fenchurch Street (formerly known as Plantation Place).

== Streetscape ==
Fenchurch Street is home to many shops, pubs and offices, including 20 Fenchurch Street, a 525 ft tall skyscraper completed in 2014.

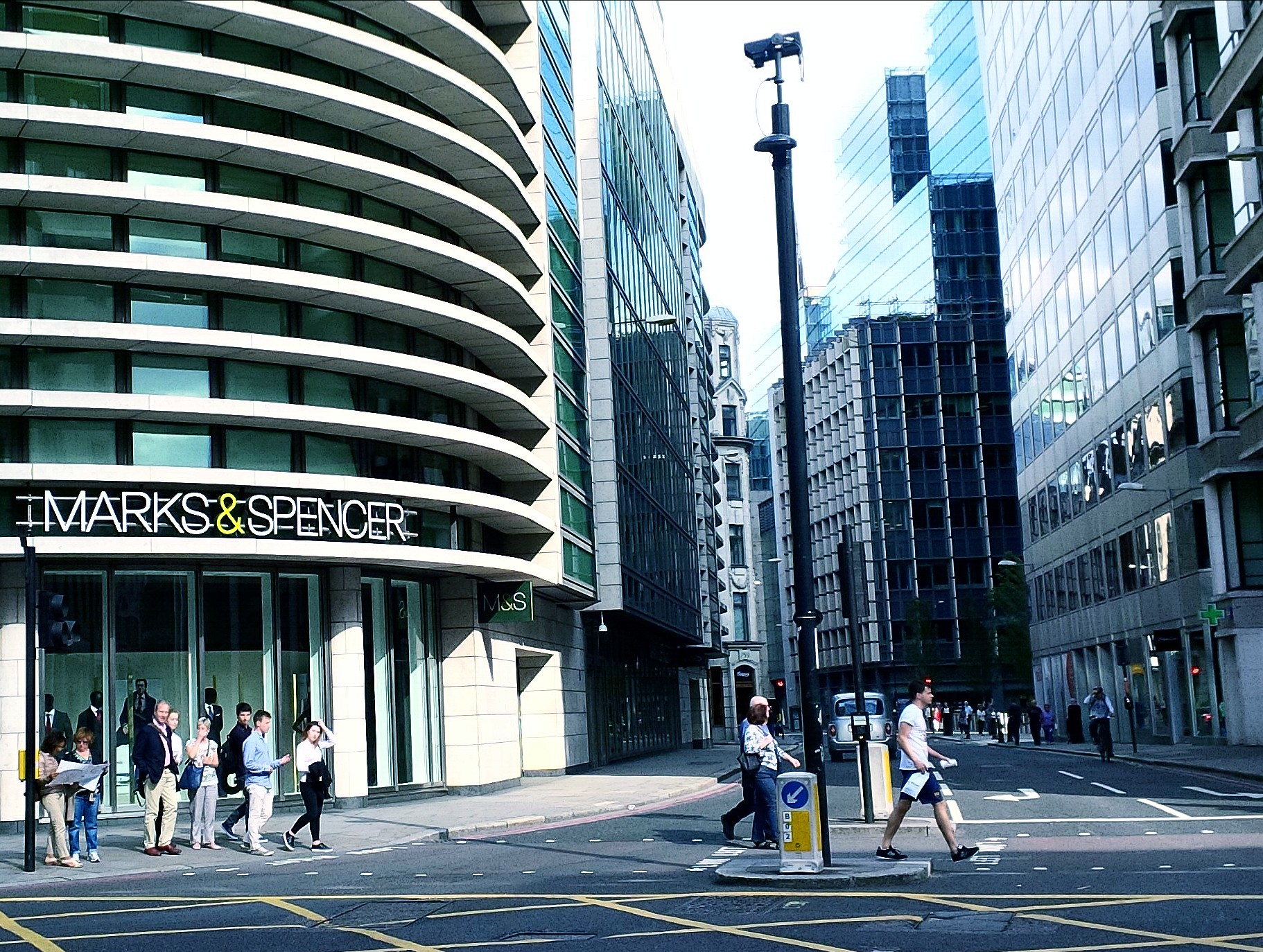
Fenchurch Street (western end)

Located at No. 71 is Lloyd's Register, where the annual Lloyd's Register of Ships is published. The frontage on Fenchurch Street was built in 1901 by Thomas Edward Collcutt and is a Grade II* listed building. The modern building behind was designed by Richard Rogers and towers above it. This was completed in 1999 and was shortlisted for the RIBA Stirling prize in 2002.

At the street's eastern end and junction with Aldgate is the Aldgate Pump, a historic water pump which has been designated a Grade II listed structure and symbolic start point of the East End of London. Further west, Fenchurch Street's junction with Lime Street was formerly the location of a Christopher Wren church, St Dionis Backchurch. First built in the 13th century dedicated to the patron saint of France, it was destroyed during the Great Fire in 1666, later rebuilt by Wren, and then demolished in 1878.

The western portion of Fenchurch Street formed part of the marathon course of the 2012 Olympic Games.

In 2019, a mixed use building of 15 storeys with a publicly accessible roof garden, called One Fen Court, opened at 120 Fenchurch Street.

The nearest London Underground stations are Aldgate (just beyond the eastern end of the street), Tower Hill (to the southeast) and Monument (to the west); Fenchurch Street railway station has no direct Underground connection.

The postcode for the street is EC3M.

== See also ==
Nearby streets:

- Leadenhall Street
- Mark Lane
- Mincing Lane
- Philpot Lane
- Lime Street
- Fen Court
