= Jones Counter =

Bicycle odometer

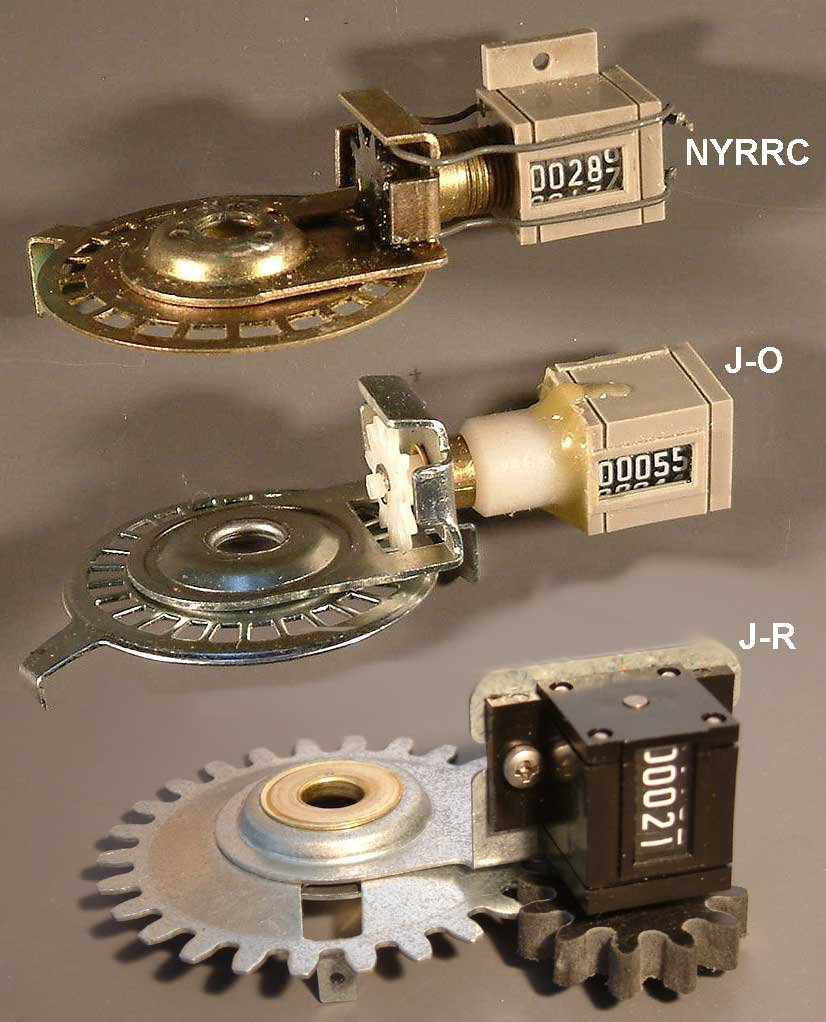
Jones Counters: Upper- NYRRC model. Middle- Oerth model. Lower- Model JR

The Jones Counter is a type of bicycle odometer which adds the function of a surveyor's wheel to a bicycle. It was developed in 1971 by Alan Jones to accurately measure the length of road running race courses. The use of bicycles to measure race courses was developed by John Jewell in the UK and brought to the U.S. by Ted Corbitt.

The counter has gears that drive a mechanical digital counter. One count typically corresponds to about 1/20 of a wheel revolution (this varies if a different gear ratio is used); this provides a resolution of about 10 cm in course length, although overall accuracy, depending on calibration and other factors, is lower, but normally better than 1 part in 1,000.

Almost all road running courses in the world are measured with this device. The Jones Counter has been used to measure all Olympic Marathon courses since the 1976 Montreal Olympics except for the 1980 Moscow Olympics. In addition, it has often been used to measure Olympic Road Race Walking Courses.

== Models ==
=== Clain Jones Counter ===
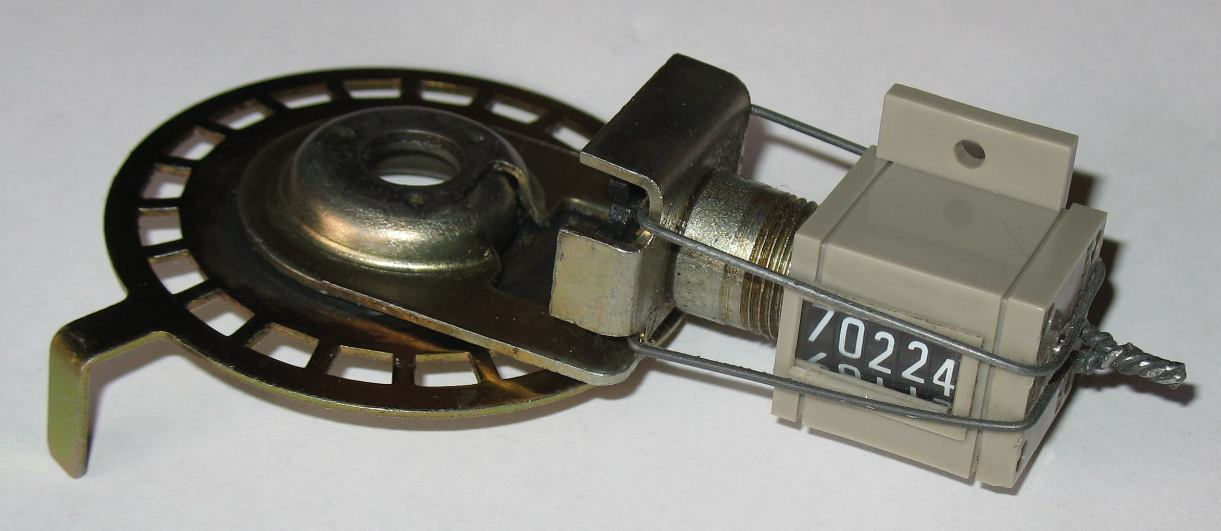
Original Jones Counter, 1975

The original production version was manufactured by Alan Jones's son Clain from 1973 to 1982. The gearing produces 20 counts per revolution of the bicycle wheel.

=== NYRRC Jones Counter ===
Production was taken over by New York Road Runners from 1983 to approximately 1990.

=== Jones-Oerth Counter ===
Paul Oerth took up production in approximately 1990 and continued to about 2006. These models have a different gear ratio (260/11 counts per wheel revolution). In 2006, production of the necessary gears ceased, and an alternative plastic-encapsulated set of gears was introduced. This was short-lived, and the Oerth model went out of production.

=== Jones-Oerth-Lacroix Counter ===
The JOL counter is a variation of the Jones-Oerth model. Created by Laurent Lacroix in 2000, its distinguishing feature is a 27" rotary cable that allows the user to mount the Veeder-Root Counter on the handlebars.

=== Jones Counter model JR ===
Development of a new model started in 2007. The first production units became available in April 2008 and were used for the measurement of the London Marathon, which took place on April 13, 2008.

The gearing (260/11 counts per wheel revolution) is identical to that of the Jones-Oerth model.

== Use for measuring road-race courses ==
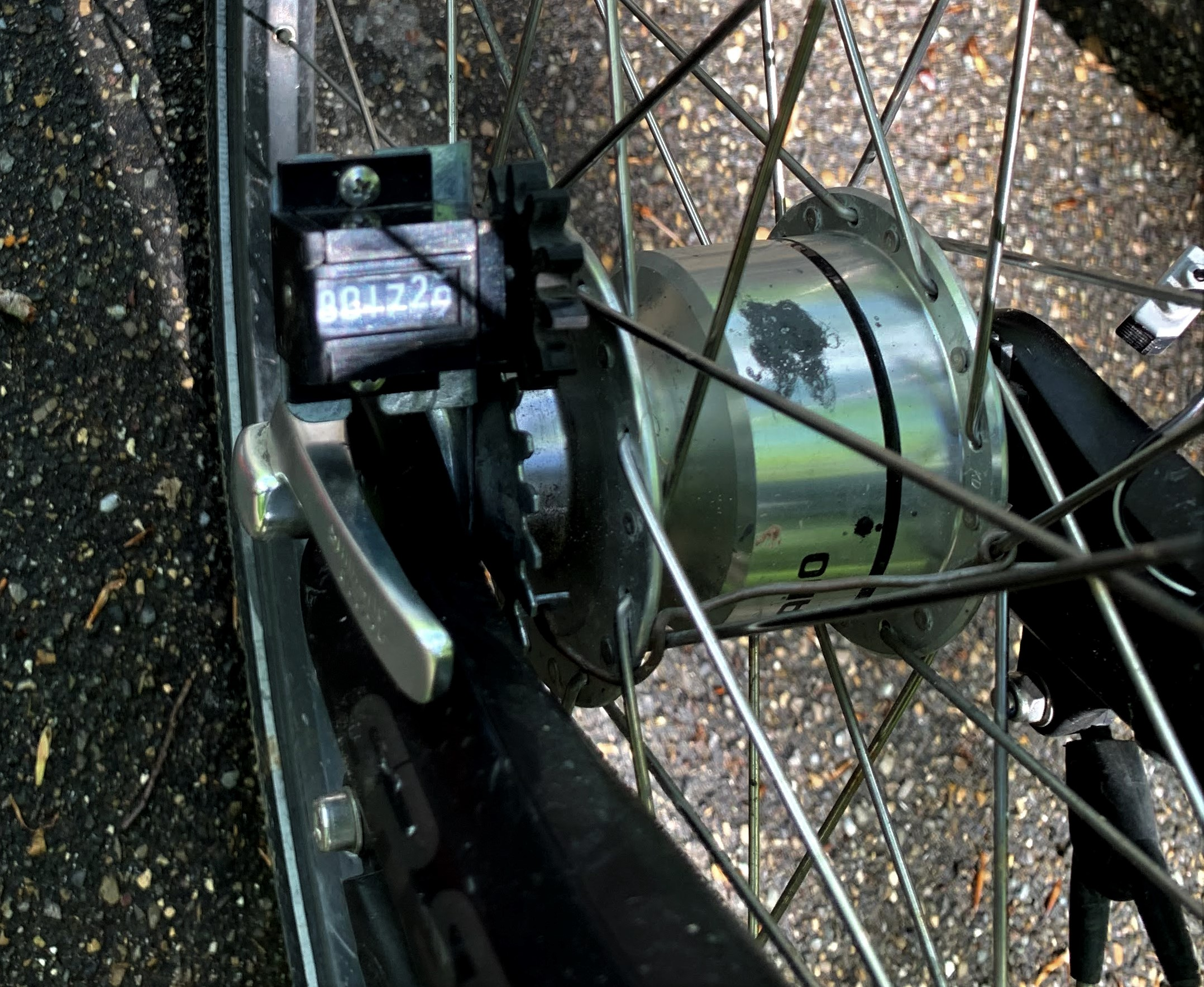
Jones Counter on the front wheel of a bicycle

To measure road-race courses, the counter is fitted to a bicycle between the left fork leg and the front wheel. The tab or tabs on the large ring gear engage with the spokes, thus providing drive to a Veeder-Root counter.

Before the counter is used, the bicycle must first be calibrated by being ridden on a straight section of road between marks whose separation has been accurately measured by steel tape. A calibration can then be calculated in terms of counts per kilometer. Next, the bicycle is ridden over the race course to determine its length. Finally, the bicycle is recalibrated by riding again over the calibration distance. This is done to check for changes in bicycle-wheel diameter due to temperature changes, air leakage, and other causes.

== See also ==
- Short course prevention factor
