= Street names of the City of London =

Etymology of London street names

This is a list of the etymology of street names in the City of London.

== A ==
- Abchurch Lane and Abchurch Yard – after the adjacent St Mary Abchurch
- Adam's Court – thought to be for Sir Thomas Adams, 1st Baronet, master of the Worshipful Company of Drapers and later Lord Mayor of London
- Addle Hill – from an Old English word for prince (athling)
- Addle Street – from an Old English word for filth/dung, presumably descriptive, though also may be the same etymology as Addle Hill above
- Alban Highwalk and St Albans Court – after the adjacent St Alban, Wood Street church, of which only the tower now remains
- Albion Place (off London Wall)
- Albion Way
- Aldermanbury and Aldermanbury Square – the site of a burgh (enclosed settlement) of a Saxon-era alderman
- Alderman's Walk – formerly Dashwood's Walk, for Francis Dashwood, who lived here in the 18th century; it was changed when he became an alderman
- Aldersgate Court and Aldersgate Street – the name Aldersgate is first recorded around 1000 in the form Ealdredesgate, i.e. 'gate associated with a man named Ealdrād'. The gate, constructed by the Romans in the 2nd or 3rd centuries when London Wall was constructed, probably acquired its name in the late Saxon period
- Aldgate, Aldgate Avenue and Aldgate High Street – thought to be an alteration of Old Gate; others think it stems from Ale Gate (after a local inn) or All Gate (as it was open to all)
- Allhallows Lane – after the church of All-Hallows-the-Great and Less, both destroyed in the Great Fire of 1666; the Great was rebuilt by Christopher Wren, but was demolished in 1894
- Amen Corner and Amen Court – by association with the nearby St Paul's Cathedral
- America Square – laid out in 1767–1770 by George Dance the Younger and named in honour of the American colonies
- Andrewes Highwalk – presumably after Lancelot Andrewes, rector of the nearby St Giles-without-Cripplegate Church
- Angel Court – named after a long demolished inn of this name
- Angel Lane
- Angel Street – after a demolished inn of this name; formerly Angle Alley
- Apothecary Street – after the nearby Worshipful Society of Apothecaries
- Appold Street
- The Arcade (Liverpool Street) – presumably descriptive
- Arthur Street – unknown
- Artillery Lane – this formerly led to the Tasel Close Artillery Yard, which stood here in the 17th–18th centuries
- Artizan Street
- Ashentree Court – after the ashen trees formerly located here at the Whitefriars' monastery
- Athene Place
- Austin Friars and Austin Friars Passage and Austin Friars Square – after Austin Friars, a medieval friary which stood here in the medieval period
- Ave Maria Lane – after the Hail Mary (Ave Maria), by association with the nearby St Paul's Cathedral
- The Avenue (Cutlers Gardens) – presumably descriptive

== B ==
- Back Alley – presumably descriptive
- Back Passage – presumably descriptive
- Bakers Hall Court – after the nearby hall of the Worshipful Company of Bakers
- Ball Court
- Baltic Street West – the streets here were built by a timber merchant circa 1810 who named them after trade-related activities; Baltic refers to the Baltic softwood trade
- Barbon Alley – after Nicholas Barbon, 17th-century economist
- Barley Mow Passage – after a former inn here of this name, possibly by reference to alcohol, or else a corruption of the nearby St Bartholomew's church and hospital
- Barnard's Inn – named after Lionel Barnard, owner of a town house (or 'inn') here in the mid-15th century
- Bartholomew Close and Bartholomew Place – after St Bartholomew's Priory, which stood here and is remembered in the names of the local hospital and two churches
- Bartholomew Lane – after the former St Bartholomew-by-the-Exchange church, demolished in 1840
- Bartlett Court, Bartlett Street and Bartletts Passage – after Thomas Bartlett, court printer to Edward VI, who owned property here
- Basinghall Avenue and Basinghall Street – thought to be after land owned here by the people of Basa or Basing (in Old Basing, Hampshire), or possibly after a mansion house of the Bassing (or Basing) family, who were prominent in the City beginning in the 13th century
- Bassishaw Highwalk – after the Bassishaw ward in which it is located
- Bastion Highwalk – presumably after the adjacent Roman bastion ruins
- Bear Alley – thought to be after a former inn of this name
- Beech Gardens and Beech Street – after beech trees which formerly stood here; the name is an old one, recorded as Bechestrete in the 13th century
- Beehive Passage – after a former tavern here of this name
- Bengal Court – presumably after the former British colony of Bengal
- Bell Court
- Bell Inn Yard – after a former inn of this name
- Bell Wharf Lane – unknown, possibly after a former tavern of this name; formerly Emperor's Head Lane, after an inn here
- Ben Jonson Place – after Ben Jonson, 17th-century playwright and poet
- Bennet's Hill – after the adjacent St Benet's church
- Bevis Marks – corruption of Bury Marks, after a former house on this site given to Bury St Edmunds Abbey in the 1100s; mark is thought to note a boundary here
- Billiter Court and Billiter Street – after former belzeter (bell foundry) located here
- Birchin Lane – unknown, though suggested to come from the Old English beord-ceorfere ('beard carver' i.e. a barber's); it has had several variations on this name in the past, including Berchervere, Berchenes and Birchen
- Bishop's Court
- Bishopsgate, Bishopsgate Arcade and Bishopsgate Churchyard – after one of the city gates that formerly stood here, thought to commemorate Saint Earconwald, Bishop of London in the 7th century
- Blackfriars Bridge, Blackfriars Court, Blackfriars Lane, Blackfriars Passage and Blackfriars Underpass – after the former Dominican (or Black friars, after their robes) friary that stood here 1276–1538
- Blomfield Street – after Charles James Blomfield, Bishop of London 1828–1856
- Bloomberg Arcade – after its owners/developers Bloomberg L.P.
- Bolt Court – thought to be after a former tavern called the Bolt-in-Tun
- Bond Court – after a 17th-century property developer of this name
- Booth Lane
- Botolph Alley and Botolph Lane – after the St Botolph Billingsgate church which stood near here, destroyed in the Great Fire of 1666
- Bouverie Street – after William Bouverie, 1st Earl of Radnor
- Bow Churchyard and Bow Lane – after the adjacent St Mary-le-Bow church; it was formerly known as Hosier Lane (after the local stocking making trade), and prior to that Cordewanere Street (meaning 'leather-workers')
- Brabant Court – thought to be after the Dutch/Belgian province of this name, though possibly a corruption of a personal name (prior to the 18th century it was known as Braben Court, and before that Brovens Court)
- Brackley Street – after the Earls of Bridgewater, also called the Viscounts Brackley, who owned a house near here
- Braidwood Passage – presumably after 19th-century fireman James Braidwood
- Brandon Mews - after Robert Brandon (d.1369), granted the lordship of the manor Barbican in 1336 by Edward III
- Bread Street – after the bakery trade that formerly took place here
- Bream's Buildings – thought to be named for its 18th-century builder
- Breton Highwalk – presumably after the 16th–17th-century poet Nicholas Breton
- Brewer's Hall Gardens – after the adjacent Worshipful Company of Brewers hall
- Brick Court – as this was home to the first set of brick buildings in the area
- Bride Court, Bride Lane, St Bride's Avenue, St Bride's Passage and St Bride Street – after the adjacent St Bride's Church
- Bridewell Place – after the adjacent St Bride's Church and a well that was formerly located here in the early Middle Ages; the name was later given to Bridewell Palace (demolished in the 1860s)
- Bridgewater Highwalk, Bridgewater Square and Bridgewater Street – after the Earls of Bridgewater, also called the Viscounts Brackley, who owned a house near here
- Britannic Highwalk
- Broadgate and Broadgate Circle – developed in the late 1980s, presumably named for the former Broad Street station on this site and the adjacent Bishopsgate
- Broad Lane, Broad Street Avenue, New Broad Street and Old Broad Street – simply a descriptive name, dating to the early Middle Ages; the northernmost section was formerly 'New Broad Street'; however, this has now switched onto an adjacent side street
- Broken Wharf – this wharf fell into disrepair owing to a property dispute in the 14th century
- Brown's Buildings
- Brushfield Street – after Thomas Brushfield, Victorian-era representative for this area at the Metropolitan Board of Works; the westernmost section, here forming the boundary with Tower Hamlets, was formerly called Union Street
- Bucklersbury and Bucklersbury Passage – after the Buckerel/Bucherel family who owned land here in the 1100s
- Budge Row – formerly home to the drapery trade; a budge/boge was a type of lamb's wool
- Bull's Head Passage – thought to be after an inn or shop of this name
- Bunyan Court – after the author John Bunyan, who attended the nearby St Giles-without-Cripplegate church
- Burgon Street – after Dean Burgon of St Paul's Cathedral; prior to 1885 it was called New Street
- Bury Court and Bury Street – after a former house on this site given to Bury St Edmunds Abbey in the 1100s
- Bush Lane – thought to be after a former inn of this name
- Byward Street – after the adjacent Byward Tower of the Tower of London

== C ==
- Camomile Street – after the camomile formerly grown here for medicine
- Canon Alley – presumably in reference to the adjacent St Paul's Cathedral
- Cannon Street – a contraction of the 14th-century Candlewick Street, meaning a street where candle-makers were based
- Capel Court – after William Capel, Lord Mayor of London in the early 16th century
- Carlisle Avenue – unknown
- Carmelite Street – after the Carmelite order (known as the White friars), who were granted land here by Edward I
- Carter Court and Carter Lane – after the cratering trade that formerly took place here, or possibly also after someone with this name
- Carthusian Street – after the Carthusian monks who lived near here in the Middle Ages
- Castle Baynard Street – after Castle Baynard which formerly stood here
- Castle Court – after a former inn of this name
- Catherine Wheel Alley – after a former inn of this name, which was named for the Catherine wheel on the coat of arms of the Worshipful Company of Turners
- Cavendish Court – after the Cavendish family, Dukes of Devonshire, who owed a house near here in the 1600s
- Chancery Lane – the former site of Edward III's office of the Master of the Rolls of Chancery
- Change Alley – after the nearby Royal Exchange
- Charterhouse Square and Charterhouse Street – Anglicisation of Chartreuse, from Grande Chartreuse, head monastery of the Carthusians in France; a nearby abbey was founded by monks of this order in 1371
- Cheapside and Cheapside Passage – from chepe, an Old English word meaning 'market'; this was the western end of a market that stretched over the Eastcheap
- Cheshire Court – after the adjacent Ye Olde Cheshire Cheese pub
- Chiswell Street – either for old term meaning 'stony/gravelly earth', or a corruption of 'Choice Well', denoting a source of clean water
- Church Cloisters – after the adjacent St Mary-at-Hill church; Church Passage till 1938
- Church Court – after the adjacent Temple Church
- Church Entry – after the former St Ann Blackfriars church which burned down in the 1666 fire
- Circus Place – after the adjacent Finsbury Circus
- Clements Lane and St Clement's Court – after the adjacent St Clement's, Eastcheap church
- Clerk's Place
- Clifford's Inn Passage – after an inn (townhouse) given to Robert de Clifford, 1st Baron de Clifford by Edward II
- Cloak Lane – unknown, though possibly from cloaca, an old word for a sewer; prior to the mid-17th century it was Horseshoebridge Street, after a bridge that stood here over the Walbrook
- Cloth Court, Cloth Fair and Cloth Street – after a long-running cloth fair that was formerly held here
- Clothier Street – after the former clothes market that operated here
- Cobb's Court
- Cock Hill – unknown, possibly from an old inn of this name
- Cock Lane – thought to be after either cock rearing or cock fighting that formerly occurred here
- Coleman Street and Coleman Street Buildings – possibly after a church of this name or a personal name, or literally after the coalmen who formerly lived in this area in the Middle Ages
- College Hill, College Street and Little College Lane – after the adjacent St Michael Paternoster Royal, which was created as a collegiate church by Richard Whittington in 1419; College Street was formerly Paternoster Street (meaning rosary makers and College Hill was Royal Street (a corruption of La Réole, France, where local wine merchants hailed from)
- Compter Passage – presumably after the former Wood Street Compter
- Cooper's Row – after an 18th-century property owner of this name; prior to this it was Woodruffe Lane, also thought to be after a property owner
- Copthall Avenue, Copthall Buildings and Copthall Close – after a former 'copt hall' (crested hall) that stood here
- Corbet Court – after a local 17th-century property developer
- Cornhill – thought to be after the corn formerly grown or sold here
- Cousin Lane – after either Joanna or William Cousin, the first a local landowner, the latter a 14th-century sheriff
- Cowper's Court – after the Cowper family, local landowners
- Crane Court – formerly Two Crane Court, possibly after a coat of arms of one of the local landowning families
- Creechurch Lane and Creechurch Place – after the former Holy Trinity Priory near here; it was also named Christ Church, later corrupted to Creechurch, and later also given to St Katharine Cree church
- Creed Court and Creed Lane – by association with the nearby St Paul's Cathedral
- Crescent – thought to be first crescent-shaped street in London
- Cripplegate Street – after the former Cripplegate that stood here, referring either to a crepel (Latin for 'covered way') or the association with the nearby St Giles-without-Cripplegate church (St Giles is the patron saint of cripples)
- Cromwell Highwalk and Cromwell Place – presumably after Oliver Cromwell, who was married in the nearby St Giles-without-Cripplegate Church in 1620
- Crosby Square – after Crosby House, built for Sir John Crosby, 15th-century merchant and politician
- Cross Keys Square – after a house or inn called Cross Keys that stood here in Tudor times
- Cross Lane – descriptive; it was formerly Fowle Lane (literally 'foul')
- Crosswall – descriptive, as it crosses the boundary of the city wall
- Crown Court
- Crown Office Row – after the Clerks of the Crown Office formerly located here
- Crutched Friars – after the Crutched Friars, a religious order who had a friary here in the early Middle Ages which was dissolved by Henry VIII
- Cullum Street – after either Sir John Cullum, 17th-century sheriff who owned land here, or Thomas Cullum
- Cunard Place – after the Cunard Line headquarters, formerly located here
- Cursitor Street – after the Cursitors' office, established here in the 16th century
- Custom House Walk – after the adjacent Custom House
- Cutler Street and Cutlers Gardens Arcade – after the Worshipful Company of Cutlers, who owned land here

== D ==
- Dark House Walk – after a former inn here called the Darkhouse; it was formerly Dark House Lane, and prior to that Dark Lane
- Dean's Court – after the Dean of St Paul's
- Defoe Place – after the author Daniel Defoe
- Devonshire Row and Devonshire Square – after the Cavendish family, Dukes of Devonshire, who owed a house near here in the 1600s
- Distaff Lane – formerly Little Distaff Lane, as it lay off the main Distaff Lane (now absorbed into Cannon Street); in medieval times the area was home to a distaff industry
- Doby Court – thought to be after a local landowner; prior to 1800 called Maidenhead Court
- Dorset Buildings and Dorset Rise – Salisbury Court, London home of the bishops of Salisbury, formerly stood near here; after the Dissolution of the Monasteries it passed to Thomas Sackville, 1st Earl of Dorset
- Dowgate Hill – after a former watergate leading to the Thames here; it was formerly Duuegate, Old English for 'dove' (possibly a personal name), or possibly simply from the word 'down'
- Drapers Gardens – after the adjacent Worshipful Company of Drapers building
- Dukes Place – after Thomas Howard, 4th Duke of Norfolk, who inherited a house near here from his uncle Thomas Audley, who had gained the land following the Dissolution of the Monasteries
- Dunster Court – corruption of St Dunstan's Court, as it lay in the parish of St Dunstan-in-the-East
- Dyer's Buildings – after almshouses owned by the Worshipful Company of Dyers formerly located here

== E ==
- Eastcheap – as it was the eastern end of the former Cheapside market
- East Harding Street and West Harding Street – after local 16th-century property owner Agnes Harding, who bequeathed the surrounding area to the Worshipful Company of Goldsmiths for the upkeep of widows
- East Passage – presumably descriptive
- East Poultry Avenue and West Poultry Avenue – after the meat trade here at Smithfield Market
- Eldon Street – after John Scott, 1st Earl of Eldon, Lord Chancellor in the early 19th century, or a tavern named after him
- Elm Court – after the elm trees in the Temple Gardens
- Essex Court – presumably after the earls of Essex, who owned a townhouse near here (hence the nearby Essex Street)
- Exchange Arcade, Exchange Place and Exchange Square

== F ==
- Falcon Court – after a former inn or shop of this name
- Falcon Highwalk
- Fann Street – thought to be named after a local property owner or tradesman of this name
- Farringdon Street – from Sir William or Nicholas de Farnedon/Faringdon, local sheriffs or aldermen in the 13th century
- Fen Court, Fenchurch Avenue, Fenchurch Buildings, Fenchurch Place and Fenchurch Street – after a fen which was formerly located near here, and possibly the former St Gabriel Fenchurch
- Fetter Lane and New Fetter Lane – formerly Fewter Lane, a medieval term for an idler, stemming originally from the Old French faitour ('lawyer')
- Finch Lane – after Robert Fink (some sources: Aelfwin Finnk), who paid for the rebuilding of the former St Benet Fink Church in the 13th century; the church was destroyed in the 1666 Fire, and its replacement demolished in the 1840s
- Finsbury Avenue, Finsbury Avenue Square, Finsbury Circus – after a Saxon burgh (settlement) owned by someone called Finn
- Fish Street Hill, Fish Wharf and Old Fish Street Hill – after the former local fish trade here, centred on Billingsgate Fish Market
- Fishmongers Hall Wharf – after the adjacent Fishmongers' Hall
- Fleet Place, Fleet Street and Old Fleet Lane – after the now covered river Fleet which flowed near here
- Fore Street and Fore Street Avenue – named after its location in front of the City walls
- Fort Street – after the former armoury and artillery grounds located near here
- Foster Lane – corruption of Vedast, after the adjacent St Vedast Church
- Founders' Court – after the Worshipful Company of Founders, who were formerly based here
- Fountain Court – after the 17th-century fountain located here
- Frederick's Place – after John Frederick, Lord Mayor of London in 1661
- French Ordinary Court – former site of an 'ordinary' (cheap eating place) for the local French community in the 17th century
- Friar Street – after the former Dominican friary that stood here 1276–1538
- Friday Street – after the former local fish trade here, with reference to the popularity of fish on this day owing to the Catholic Friday Fast; the street formerly extended all the way to Cheapside
- Frobisher Crescent – after the explorer Martin Frobisher, who is buried in the nearby St Giles-without-Cripplegate
- Fruiterers Passage – after the Worshipful Company of Fruiterers, formerly based here
- Furnival Street – after the nearby Furnival's Inn, owned by Sir Richard Furnival in the late 1500s
- Fye Foot Lane – corruption of five foot, after its original breadth; formerly Finamour Lane, after an individual with this surname

== G ==
- Garden Court – after the adjacent Temple Gardens
- Gardner's Lane – unknown, though thought to be after a local property owner; formerly called Dunghill Lane in the 18th century
- Garlick Hill – as it led to the former Garlick Hythe, a wharf where garlic was unloaded from ships
- George Yard – after the adjacent George and Vulture pub, or another pub of this name formerly located here
- Giltspur Street – thought to be the former location of a spurriers
- Gloucester Court
- Godliman Street – thought to be after Godalming, Surrey, a family bearing this name, or the selling of godalmins (a type of skin/leather); it was formerly Paul's Chain, after the chain placed here to prevent access to St Paul's churchyard
- Golden Lane – formerly Goldynglane, thought to be after a local property owner of the name Golding/Golda
- Goldsmith Street – after the nearby Worshipful Company of Goldsmiths
- Goodman's Court and Goodman's Yard – thought to be after the Goodman family, local farmers in the 16th century
- Gophir Lane – formerly Gofaire Lane, thought to be for Elias Gofaire, 14th-century property owner
- Goring Street – unknown; prior to 1885 known as Castle Court, after a former inn
- Goswell Road – there is dispute over the origins of the name, with some sources claiming the road was named after a nearby garden called 'Goswelle' or 'Goderell' which belonged to Robert de Ufford, 1st Earl of Suffolk, whilst others state it derives from God's Well, and the traditional pagan practice of well-worship, and others a 'Gode Well' formerly located here
- Gough Square – after Richard Gough, wool merchant, local landowners in the early 1700s
- Gracechurch Street – formerly Garscherch Street, Grass Church Street and Gracious Street, presumably after a local church (mostly likely St Benet Gracechurch and/or grassy area
- Grand Avenue – presumably descriptive
- Grant's Quay Wharf
- Gravel Lane – descriptive, after its gravelly texture
- Great Bell Alley – formerly just Bell Alley, it was named for a former inn
- Great Eastern Walk (Liverpool Street station) – presumably descriptive, or after the Great Eastern Railway company
- Great New Street, Little New Street, Middle New Street, New Street Court, New Street Square – built in the mid-1600s, and named simply as they were then new
- Great St Helen's and St Helen's Place – after the adjacent St Helen's Church, Bishopsgate and former priory here of the same name
- Great St Thomas Apostle – after the St Thomas the Apostle church, destroyed in the Great Fire
- Great Swan Alley – after a former inn here called The White Swan
- Great Tower Street – after the adjacent Tower of London
- Great Trinity Lane, Little Trinity Lane and Trinity Lane – after the former Holy Trinity the Less church, demolished 1871
- Great Winchester Street – following the Dissolution of the Monasteries, the nearby Austin Friars was acquired by Sir William Powlet, Lord Treasurer; his son Lord Winchester renamed it for himself
- Green Arbour Court – thought to be from a 17th-century inn
- The Green Yard
- Gresham Street – after Thomas Gresham, merchant and founder the Royal Exchange; the western part of this street was formerly known as Lad Lane, and the eastern part Cat Eaton Street (named literally after the cats here); they were amalgamated in 1845
- Greyfriars Passage – after the Franciscan order, also known as the Grey friars, who owned land here in the Middle Ages
- Greystoke Place – after a local 18th-century property owner of this name; prior to this it was Black Raven Alley, after a local inn
- Grocer's Hall Court and Grocer's Hall Gardens – after the adjacent Worshipful Company of Grocers
- Groveland Court
- Guildhall Buildings and Guildhall Yard – after the adjacent Guildhall
- Guinness Court
- Gunpowder Square
- Gutter Lane – corruption of Guthrun/Godrun, thought to be after an early Danish landowner

== H ==
- Half Moon Court – after a former inn of this name
- Hammett Street – after its 18th-century builder Benjamin Hammett, also Lord Mayor of London in 1797
- Hanging Sword Alley – thought to be after a former inn, shop or fencing school of this name
- Hanseatic Walk – presumably in reference to Hanseatic League
- Hare Place – after Hare House which formerly stood here; formerly Ram Alley, a noted criminal area, prompting the name change
- Harp Alley – thought to be after a former 17th-century inn of this name
- Harp Lane – after the Harp brewhouse which formerly stood here
- Harrow Place – thought to be named for a harrow-making shop formerly located here after a former inn of this name
- Hart Street – unknown, formerly Herthstrete and Hertstrete, possibly after the hearthstone trade here
- Hartshorn Alley – after the Hart's Horn inn which formerly stood here
- Haydon Street and Haydon Walk – after John Heydon, Master of the Ordnance 1627–42, who lived near here
- Hayne Street – after Haynes timber merchants and carpenters, who owned a shop here after a former inn of this name
- Hen and Chicken Court – after former inn(s) here of this name
- Heneage Lane and Heneage Place – after Thomas Heneage, who acquired a house here after the dissolution of the nearby abbey
- High Holborn, Holborn, Holborn Circus and Holborn Viaduct – thought to be from hollow bourne, i.e. the river Fleet which formerly flowed in a valley near here. The High stems from the fact that rode led away from the river to higher ground. Circus is a British term for a road junction, and viaduct is a self-explanatory term.
- High Timber Street – after a former timber hythe (wharf), recorded here from the late 13th century
- Hind Court
- Hogarth Court – the artist William Hogarth formerly lodged here at a local tavern
- Honey Lane – after honey that was formerly sold here as part of the Cheapside market
- Hood Court
- Hope Square
- Hosier Lane – after the former hosiery trade based here
- Houndsditch – generally thought to be literally after a local ditch where dead dogs were dumped; however, others think it may refer to a nearby kennels
- Huggin Court and Huggin Hill – formerly Hoggen Lane, as hogs were kept here
- Hutton Street

== I ==
- Idol Lane – formerly Idle Lane, it may be a personal name or denote local idlers
- India Street – after the former warehouses here of the East India Company; prior to 1913 it was George Street
- Inner Temple Lane – after the adjacent Inner Temple
- Ireland Yard – after haberdasher William Ireland, who owned a house here in the 1500s
- Ironmonger Lane – an ancient name, after the former ironmongery trade here

== J ==
- Jewry Street – after the former Jewish community which was based here; formerly Poor Jewry Street
- John Carpenter Street – after John Carpenter, Town Clerk of London in the mid-15th century
- John Milton Passage – after the author John Milton
- John Trundle Highwalk – after John Trundle, 16th–17th-century author and book seller
- John Wesley Highwalk – after John Wesley, founder of Methodism
- Johnsons Court – after a local 16th-century property owning family of this name; the connection with Samuel Johnson is coincidental

== K ==
- Keats Place
- Kennett Wharf Lane – after its late 18th-century owner
- Kinghorn Street – formerly King Street, renamed in 1885 to avoid confusion with many other streets of this name
- Kingscote Street – formerly King Edward Street (for Edward VI), renamed in 1885 to avoid confusion with the street of this name off Newgate Street
- King Street – built after the Great Fire and named for Charles II
- King Edward Street – named for Edward VI, who turned the adjacent Greyfriars monastery into a hospital; it was formerly known as Stinking Lane
- King William Street – named for William IV, reigning monarch when the street was built in 1829–1835
- King's Arms Yard – named after a former inn of this name
- King's Bench Walk – named for the adjacent housing for lawyers of the King's Bench
- Knightrider Court and Knightrider Street – thought to be literally a street where knights used to ride

== L ==
- Lakeside Terrace – descriptive
- Lambert Jones Mews – after Lambert Jones, Victorian-era councilman
- Lambeth Hill – corruption of Lambert/Lambart, local property owner
- Langthorn Court – named after a former property owner of this name
- Lauderdale Place – named for the Earls of Lauderdale, who owned a house here
- Laurence Pountney Hill and Laurence Pountney Lane – after the former St Laurence Pountney church, built by Sir John de Pulteney but destroyed in the Great Fire
- Lawrence Lane – after the nearby St Lawrence Jewry church
- Leadenhall Market, Leadenhall Place and Leadenhall Street – after the Leaden Hall, a house owned by Sir Hugh Neville in the 14th century
- Lime Street – Medieval name denoting a place of lime kilns
- Limeburner Lane – after the lime-burning trade formerly located here
- Lindsey Street – unknown
- Little Britain – thought to be after Robert le Bretoun, 13th-century local landowner, probably from Brittany
- Little Somerset Street
- Liverpool Street – built in 1829 and named for Robert Jenkinson, 2nd Earl of Liverpool, Prime Minister 1812–1827
- Lloyd's Avenue – as the headquarters of the Lloyd's Register (named for Lloyd's Coffee House) were located here
- Lombard Court and Lombard Lane – from Lombardy, as this area was home to a community from there; the name was altered from Lombard Street to avoid confusion with the other street of this name
- Lombard Street – from the wool merchants from Lombardy who traded and lent money here from the 13th century onwards
- London Bridge – self-explanatory; for centuries this was the only bridge crossing the Thames
- London Street and New London Street – named after local 18th-century property owner John London, and possibly the city itself; the 'New' section was a later extension
- London Wall – after the city wall which formerly ran along this route (though there are still some ruins visible)
- Long Lane – a descriptive name
- Lothbury – meaning 'burgh of Lotha/Hlothere', a 7th-century name
- Lovat Street – thought to be either a corruption of Lucas Lane, after a local landowner, or for Lord Lovat, local politician; it was formerly Love Lane, probably a euphemism for prostitution, and changed to avoid confusion with the other city lane of this name
- Love Lane – unknown, but possible with reference to the prostitution that occurred here in the 16th century; it was formerly Roper Lane, probably after the rope-making trade, but possibly after a person with this surname
- Lower Thames Street and Upper Thames Street – thought to mark the bank of the Thames in Roman/Saxon times
- Ludgate Broadway, Ludgate Circus, Ludgate Hill and Ludgate Square – the former city gate of this name that formerly stood here, thought to be an Old English term for 'postern-gate'

== M ==
- Mac's Place
- Magpie Alley – after a former inn here of this name
- Mansell Street – named after either local landowner Sir William Leman, 2nd Baronet for his wife Mary Mansell or Mansel Leman, also a local property owner in the 17th century
- Mansion House Place and Mansion House Street – after the adjacent Mansion House
- Mark Lane – unknown, though possibly a corruption of Martha; formerly known as Martlane and Marke Lane
- Martin Lane – after the former St Martin Orgar church, demolished (save for the tower) in 1820
- Mason's Avenue – after the Worshipful Company of Masons, whose headquarters formerly stood here
- Middle Street – descriptive
- Middlesex Passage – formerly Middlesex Court, thought to be after Middlesex House which formerly stood here
- Middlesex Street (Petticoat Lane) and Petticoat Square – as this street forms the boundary of the city with the county of Middlesex, with the alternative name Petticoat stemming from the clothes market formerly held here; prior to 1602 it was known as Hog Lane after the animal
- Middle Temple Lane – after the adjacent Middle Temple
- Milk Street – after the milk and dairy trade that formerly occurred here in connection with the nearby Cheapside market
- Millennium Bridge – as it was built to commemorate the 2000 millennium
- Milton Court and Milton Street – after an early 19th-century lease owner of this name, or possibly the poet John Milton; prior to this it was Grub/Grubbe Street, after the former owner, or perhaps to a grube ('drain')
- Mincing Lane – after minchins/mynecen, a term for the nuns who formerly held property here prior to 1455
- Minerva Walk
- Miniver Place – after the type of fur, named by connection with the nearby Skinner's Hall
- Minories – after a former church/convent here of the Little Sisters (Sorores Minores) nuns
- Minster Court and Minster Pavement
- Mitre Square and Mitre Street – after the former Mitre Inn which stood near here
- Modern Court
- Monkwell Square – after the former street here also of this name, variously recorded as Mogwellestrate or Mukewellestrate, and thought to refer to a well owned by one Mucca
- Montague Street – after Ralph Montagu, 1st Duke of Montagu, who owned a mansion here
- Monument Street – after the nearby Monument to the Great Fire of London
- Moorfields and Moorfield Highwalk – after the marshy moorlands that formerly stood here
- Moorgate and Moorgate Place – after the gate, leading to the marshy moorlands beyond, that formerly stood here
- Moor Lane and Moor Place – after the marshy moorlands that formerly stood here
- Muscovy Street – after the Muscovy Company of Elizabethan times, or the Russian merchants formerly based here

== N ==
- Nettleton Court
- Nevill Lane
- New Bell Yard
- New Bridge Street – named in 1765 as it leads to the then-new Blackfriars Bridge
- Newbury Street – formerly New Street, renamed 1890 to avoid confusion with other streets of this name
- Newcastle Close – either after a former inn called the Castle located here, or after the city, with reference to the coal trade here
- Newcastle Court
- New Change, New Change Passage and Old Change Court – formerly Old Change, and named for a former mint and gold exchange here
- New Court – built circa 1700 and named simply because it was then new
- Newgate Street – after a new gate built here in the 1000s; the eastern part of this street was formerly Bladder Street, after the bladder selling trade here
- Newman's Court – after Lawrence Newman, who leased land here in the 17th century
- New Street – named simply as it was new when first built
- New Union Street – named as it united Moor Lane and Moorfields; it was formerly Gunn Alley
- Nicholas Lane and Nicholas Passage – after the former St Nicholas Acons church, destroyed in the Great Fire
- Noble Street – after Thomas de Noble, local 14th-century property developer
- Northumberland Alley – after Northumberland House, house of the Earls of Northumberland, which formerly stood here
- Norton Folgate – the former word a corruption of North Town, and the latter after the local Folgate family
- Norwich Street – unknown; formerly Norwich Court, and prior to that Magpie Yard, probably from a local inn
- Nun Court – thought to be after a local builder/property owner

== O ==
- Oat Lane – as oats were formerly sold here in the Middle Ages
- Octagon Arcade (Broadgate)
- Old Bailey – after a bailey fortification that formerly stood here
- Old Billingsgate Walk – after the former watergate of this name, the derivation of Billings is unknown
- Old Jewry – after a Saxon-era settlement of Jews here, thought to be termed Old following the Edict of Expulsion of all Jews from England by Edward I
- Old Mitre Court – after a former tavern of this name here
- Old Seacole Lane – thought to be after the coal trade that came from the sea and up the river Fleet here
- Old Watermen's Walk
- Outwich Street – after either Oteswich/Ottewich, meaning 'Otho's dwelling', a name for this area of London in the early Middle Ages or the former St Martin Outwich church, named for the Outwich family, demolished 1874
- Oystergate Walk – after a watergate here, and the oyster trade
- Oxford Court – after a former house here owned by the Earls of Oxford

== P ==
- Pageantmaster Court
- Pancras Lane – after St Pancras, Soper Lane church which stood here until destroyed in the Great Fire; it was formerly Needlers Lane, after the needle making trade here
- Panyer Alley – after a medieval brewery here called the panyer (basket)
- Paternoster Lane, Paternoster Row and Paternoster Square – after the paternoster (rosary) makers who formerly worked here
- Paul's Walk
- Pemberton Row – after James Pemberton, Lord Mayor of London in 1611
- Pepys Street – after 17th-century diarist Samuel Pepys, who lived and worked here
- Peterborough Court – after the abbots of Peterborough, who prior to the Dissolution of the Monasteries had a house here
- Peter's Hill – after St Peter, Paul's Wharf church, which formerly stood here until destroyed in the 1666 fire
- Petty Wales – unknown, but possibly after a Welsh community formerly based here
- Philpot Lane – commemorates prominent local family the Philpots; originally probably after John Philpot, 14th-century grocer
- Pilgrim Street – thought to be a former route for pilgrims to St Paul's Cathedral; formerly known as Stonecutters Alley and Little Bridge Street
- Pindar Street – after Sir Paul Pindar, 14th–16th-century diplomat, who had a house here
- Pinner's Passage
- Plaisterers Highwalk – after the nearby Worshipful Company of Plaisterers
- Plantation Lane
- Playhouse Yard – after the Blackfriars Playhouse, which stood here in the 17th century
- Pleydell Court and Pleydell Street – formerly Silver Street, it was renamed in 1848 by association with the neighbouring Bouverie Street; the Bouverie family were by this time known as the Pleydell-Bouveries
- Plough Court – thought to be either from an inn of this name, or an ironmongers; formerly Plough Yard
- Plough Place – after the Plough/Plow, a 16th-century eating place located here
- Plumtree Court – thought to be after either literally a plumtree, or else an inn of this name
- Pope's Head Alley – after the Pope's Head Tavern which formerly stood here, thought to stem from the 14th-century Florentine merchants who were in Papal service
- Poppins Court – shortening of Popinjay Court, meaning a parrot; it is thought to stem from the crest of Cirencester Abbey (which featured the bird), who owned a town house here
- Portsoken Street – after port-soke, as it was a soke near a port (gate) of the City
- Post Office Court – after the General Post Office which formerly stood near here
- Poultry – after the poultry which was formerly sold at the market here
- Priest's Court – with allusion to the adjacent St Vedast Church
- Primrose Hill – thought to be named after a builder of this name, or possibly the primroses which formerly grew here; formerly called Salisbury Court, as it approaches Salisbury Square
- Primrose Street – thought to be named after a builder of this name, or possibly the primroses which formerly grew here
- Prince's Street – named in reference to the adjacent King and Queen Streets
- Printers Inn Court – after the printing industry which formerly flourished here
- Printer Street – after the printing industry which formerly flourished here
- Priory Court
- Prudent Passage
- Pudding Lane – from the former term pudding meaning animals' entrails, which were dumped here in medieval times by local butchers; it was formerly Rothersgate, after a watergate located here
- Puddle Dock – thought to be either descriptive (after the water here), or named for a local wharf owner of this name
- Pump Court – after a former pump located here

== Q ==
- Quaggy Walk
- Quality Court – a descriptive name, as it was superior when built compared with the surrounding streets
- Queenhithe – formerly Ethelredshythe, after its founder King Æthelred the Unready, and hythe, meaning 'a wharf/landing place'; it was renamed after its later owner Matilda of Scotland, wife of Henry I
- Queen Isabella Way –
- Queens Head Passage – after a former house here called the Queens Head, demolished 1829
- Queen Street and Queen Street Place – named in honour of Catherine of Braganza, wife of Charles II
- Queen Victoria Street – built in 1871 and named for the then reigning monarch

== R ==
- Rangoon Street – after the former warehouses here of the East India Company, Burma, then part of British India
- Red Lion Court – after a former inn of this name
- Regent Street – after the Prince Regent
- Rising Sun Court – after the adjacent pub of this name
- Robin Hood Court – thought to be after a former inn of this name
- Rolls Buildings and Rolls Passage – the former site of a house containing the rolls of Chancery
- Rood Lane – after a former rood (cross) set up at St Margaret Pattens in the early 16th century; it became an object of veneration and offering, which helped pay for the repair of the church, but was torn down in 1558 as an item of excessive superstition
- Ropemaker Street – descriptive, after the rope making trade formerly located here
- Rose Alley – after a former inn of this name
- Rose and Crown Court
- Rose Street – after a former tavern of this name here; it was formerly Dicer Lane, possibly after either a dice maker here, or a corruption of ditcher
- Royal Exchange Avenue and Royal Exchange Buildings – after the adjacent Royal Exchange
- Russia Row – possibly to commemorate Russia's entry into the Napoleonic wars

== S ==
- St Alphage Garden and St Alphage Highwalk – after the adjacent St Alphege London Wall church, now surviving only in ruins
- St Andrew Street – after the adjacent St Andrew's Church
- St Andrew's Hill – after the adjacent St Andrew-by-the-Wardrobe church
- St Benet's Place – after the former St Benet Gracechurch which stood near here; destroyed in the Great Fire, its replacement was then demolished in 1868
- St Botolph Row and St Botolph Street – after the adjacent St Botolph's Aldgate church
- St Clare Street – after a former church/convent here of the Little Sisters of St Clare
- St Dunstan's Alley, St Dunstan's Hill and St Dunstan's Lane – after the former St Dunstan-in-the-East church, largely destroyed in the Blitz and now a small garden
- St Dunstan's Court – after the nearby St Dunstan-in-the-West church
- St Georges Court – after the former St George Botolph Lane church nearby, demolished in 1904
- St Giles Terrace – after the adjacent St Giles-without-Cripplegate church
- St James's Passage – after St James Duke's Place church, demolished 1874
- St Katherine's Row – after the St Katherine Coleman church, demolished in 1926
- St Margaret's Close – after the adjacent St Margaret Lothbury church
- St Martin's le Grand – after a former church of this name here, demolished in 1538
- St Mary at Hill – after the St Mary-at-Hill church here
- St Mary Axe – after the former Church of St Mary Axe here, demolished in the 1500s
- St Michael's Alley – after the adjacent St Michael, Cornhill church
- St Mildred's Court – after the former St Mildred, Poultry church, demolished 1872
- St Olave's Court – after the former St Olave Old Jewry church here, of which only the tower remains
- St Paul's Churchyard – after the adjacent St Paul's Cathedral; the churchyard was formerly far more extensive, but has since been built over
- St Peter's Alley – after the adjacent St Peter upon Cornhill church
- St Swithins Lane – after the former St Swithin, London Stone, largely destroyed in the Blitz and later demolished
- Salisbury Court and Salisbury Square – after the London house of the bishops of Salisbury, located here prior to the Reformation
- Salters Court – after the former hall of the Worshipful Company of Salters, moved in 1600
- Salter's Hall Court – after the former hall of the Worshipful Company of Salters, destroyed in the Blitz
- Sandy's Row – after a builder or property owner of this name
- Saracens Head Yard – after a former inn of this name
- Savage Gardens – after Thomas Savage, who owned a house here in the 1620s
- Scott's Lane
- Seething Lane – formerly Shyvethenestrat and Sivethenelane, deriving from Old English sifetha, meaning 'chaff/siftings', after the local corn threshing
- Serjeants Inn – after the former Serjeant's Inn located here before the Blitz
- Sermon Lane – thought to be after Adam la Sarmoner, 13th-century landowner
- Shafts Court – named after a maypole (or 'shaft') that formerly stood nearby at the junction of Leadenhall Street and St Mary Axe
- Sherborne Lane – earlier Shirebourne Lane, alteration of the Medieval Shitteborelane, in reference to a public privy here
- Ship Tavern Passage – after the nearby Ship tavern
- Shoe Lane – as this lane formerly led to a shoe-shaped landholding/field
- Shorter Street
- Silk Street – thought to be named for its late 18th-century builder, or the silk trade formerly located here
- Sise Lane – as it formerly led to St Benet Sherehog church, which was dedicated to St Osyth (later corrupted to Sythe, then Sise)
- Skinners Lane – after the fur trade that was former prevalent here; it was formerly Maiden Lane, after a local inn or shop
- Smithfield Street and West Smithfield – derives from the Old English 'smooth-field', a series of fields outside the City walls
- Snow Hill and Snow Hill Court – formerly Snore Hill or Snowrehill, exact meaning unknown
- Southampton Buildings – after Southampton House which formerly stood here, built for the bishops of Lincoln in the 12th century and later acquired by the earls of Southampton
- South Place and South Place Mews – named as it is south of Moorfields
- Southwark Bridge – as it leads to Southwark
- Speed Highwalk – after John Speed, Stuart-era mapmaker, who is buried in the nearby St Giles-without-Cripplegate
- Staining Lane – from Saxon-era Staeninga haga, meaning place owned by the people of Staines
- Staple Inn and Staple Inn Buildings – after the adjacent Staple Inn
- Star Alley – after a former inn here of this name
- Stationer's Hall Court – after the adjacent hall of the Worshipful Company of Stationers and Newspaper Makers
- Steelyard Passage – after the Hanseatic League Base, now under Cannon St. Station
- Stew Lane – after a former stew (hot bath) here
- Stonecutter Street – after the former stonecutting trade that took place here
- Stone House Court – after a former medieval building here called the Stone House
- Stoney Lane – simply a descriptive name, streets typically being mud tracks in former times
- Suffolk Lane – after a former house here belonging to the dukes of Suffolk
- Sugar Bakers Court – presumably descriptive
- Sugar Quay Walk – presumably descriptive
- Sun Court
- Sun Street and Sun Street Passage – after a former inn of this name
- Swan Lane – after a former inn here called the Olde Swanne; formerly Ebbgate, after a watergate here
- Swedeland Court – after the former Swedish community based here

== T ==
- Talbot Court – after a former inn of this name (or Tabard)
- Tallis Street – after the 16th-century composer Thomas Tallis, by connection with the adjacent former Guildhall School of Music and Drama
- Telegraph Street – renamed (from Bell Alley, after a former inn) when the General Post Office's telegraph department opened there
- Temple Avenue and Temple Lane – after the adjacent Temple legal district
- The Terrace (off King's Bench Walk) – presumably descriptive
- Thavies Inn – after a house here owned by the armourer Thomas (or John) Thavie in the 14th century
- Thomas More Highwalk – after 16th-century author and statesman Thomas More
- Threadneedle Street and Threadneedle Walk – originally Three Needle Street, after the sign on a needle shop located here, later corrupted due to the obvious collocation of 'thread' and 'needle'
- Three Barrels Walk
- Three Cranes Walk
- Three Nun Court
- Three Quays Walk
- Throgmorton Avenue and Throgmorton Street – after 16th-century diplomat Nicholas Throckmorton; the Avenue was built in 1876
- Tokenhouse Yard – after a 17th-century token house here (a house selling tokens during coin shortages)
- Took's Court – after local 17th-century builder/owner Thomas Tooke
- Tower Hill Terrace – after the adjacent Tower Hill
- Tower Royal – after a former medieval tower and later royal lodging house that stood here; Royal is in fact a corruption of La Réole, France, where local wine merchants hailed from
- Trig Lane – after one of several people with the surname Trigge, recorded here in the Middle Ages
- Trinity Square – after the adjacent Trinity House
- Trump Street – unknown, but thought to be after either a local builder or property owner or the local trumpet-making industry
- Tudor Street – after the Tudor dynasty, with reference to Henry VIII's nearby Bridewell Palace
- Turnagain Lane – descriptive, as it is a dead-end; recorded in the 13th century as Wendageyneslane

== U ==
- Undershaft – named after a maypole (or 'shaft') that formerly stood nearby at the junction of Leadenhall Street and St Mary Axe
- Union Court – named as when built it connected Wormwood Street to Old Broad Street

== V ==
- Victoria Avenue – named in 1901 in honour of Queen Victoria
- Victoria Embankment – after Queen Victoria, reigning queen at the time of the building of the Thames Embankment
- Vine Street – formerly Vine Yard, unknown but thought to be ether from a local inn or a vineyard
- Vintners Court – after the adjacent Worshipful Company of Vintners building; the area has been associated with the wine trade as far back as the 10th century
- Viscount Street – formerly Charles Street, both names after the Charles Egerton, Viscount Brackley, of which there were three in the 17th–18th centuries

== W ==
- Waithman Street – after Robert Waithman, Lord Mayor of London 1823–1833
- Walbrook and Walbrook Wharf – after the Walbrook stream which formerly flowed here, possibly with reference to the Anglo-Saxon wealh meaning 'foreigner' (i.e. the native Britons, or 'Welsh')
- Wardrobe Place and Wardrobe Terrace – after the Royal Wardrobe which formerly stood here until destroyed in the Great Fire of 1666
- Warwick Lane, Warwick Passage and Warwick Square – after the Neville family, earls of Warwick, who owned a house near here in the 1400s; formerly Old Dean's Lane, after a house here resided in by the Dean of St Paul's
- Watergate – after a watergate which stood here on the Thames
- Water Lane – after a former watergate that stood here by the Thames; formerly Spurrier Lane
- Watling Court and Watling Street – corrupted from the old name of Athelingestrate (Saxon Prince Street), by association with the more famous Roman Watling Street
- Well Court – after the numerous wells formerly located in this area
- Whalebone Court
- Whitecross Place
- Whitecross Street – after a former white cross which stood near here in the 1200s
- Whitefriars Street – after the Carmelite order (known as the White friars), who were granted land here by Edward I
- White Hart Court – after a former inn of this name
- White Hart Street
- White Horse Yard – after a former inn of this name
- White Kennett Street – after White Kennett, rector of St Botolph's Aldgate in the early 1700s
- White Lion Court – after a former inn of this name, destroyed by fire in 1765
- White Lion Hill – this formerly led to White Lion Wharf, which is thought to have been named after a local inn
- White Lyon Court
- Whittington Avenue – after Richard Whittington, former Lord Mayor of London
- Widegate Street – thought to be after a gate that formerly stood on this street; formerly known as Whitegate Alley
- Willoughby Highwalk – presumably after Sir Francis Willoughby, who is buried in the nearby St Giles-without-Cripplegate Church
- Wilson Street
- Wine Office Court – after an office here that granted licenses to sell wine in the 17th century
- Wood Street – as wood and fire logs were sold here as part of the Cheapside market
- Wormwood Street – after the wormwood formerly grown here for medicine
- Wrestler's Court – after a former Tudor-era house here of this name

== See also ==
- List of eponymous roads in London
