= Association of British Insurers =

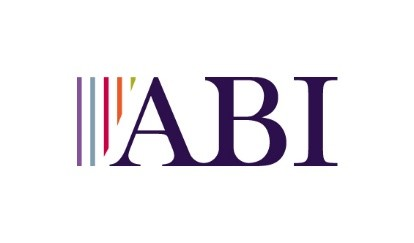
- Abbreviation: ABI
- Formation: 1985; 41 years ago
- Purpose: Insurance
- Headquarters: America Square; London, EC3; United Kingdom
- Region served: United Kingdom
- Members: 250+ UK insurance companies
- Director General: Hannah Gurga
- Main organ: ABI Board (Chair of the ABI - Rt Hon. Baroness Nicky Morgan), President of the ABI, Barry O'Dwyer, Deputy President of the ABI, Cristina Nestares, Independent Non-Executive Director and Senior Independent Director (SID), Baroness Dianne Hayter
- Staff: 100
- Website: abi.org.uk

The Association of British Insurers, or ABI, is a trade association made up of insurance companies in the United Kingdom.

== History ==
The ABI began in 1985 after several specialised insurance industry trade associations joined to form one trade association for the UK insurance industry (excluding Lloyd's of London), including the British Insurance Association, the Life Offices’ Association, the Fire Offices Committee, the Accident Offices Association, the Industrial Life Offices Association and the Accident Offices Association (Overseas).

The UK insurance industry is the largest in Europe and the third largest in the world.

In 2014, there was a "shock" announcement that Legal & General was leaving as one of ABI's around 300 corporate members, due to the ABI's "decision to transfer its investment business to the Investment Management Association". ABI, says the Insurance Journal, warned about modern building materials like external cladding posing a fire risk before the Grenfell Tower Fire. In July 2019 Amanda Blanc stepped down as ABI chair. It still had Huw Evans as director general of ABI. In March 2020, ABI suggested to the press that "most companies would not be covered by a BI policy even in the event of a Government mandated shut down" due to the COVID-19 pandemic. On March 19, 2020, Nicola Sturgeon argued publicly that insurance companies should do more to help with COVID-19 in Scotland and the UK.

Motor insurance fraud emerged as the predominant form of insurance fraud in the UK in 2023, as indicated by data from the Association of British Insurers (ABI). The figures reveal that fraudulent claims amounted to £1.1 billion in 2023, reflecting a four percent increase from 2022. In total, insurers uncovered 84,400 fraudulent claims during the year, which is an increase of 11,800 claims compared to the previous year. The average value of these claims was reported at £13,000. Notably, motor insurance fraud accounted for a significant portion of this total, with 45,800 scams identified, valued at £501 million, marking an eight percent rise from 2022.

== Structure ==
According to the association, it has around 250 companies in membership, which between them provide 90% of domestic insurance services sold in the UK. ABI member companies account for almost 20% of investments in London's stock market. Its members are major tax contributors, paying £10.4 billion in the 2010 / 2011 tax year. The organisation is funded by members' subscriptions.

Its offices are at One America Square, 17 Crosswall, City of London, EC3N 2LB. The ABI employed around 100 people in 2009.

The association is a member of Insurance Europe.

== Function ==
The ABI represents the collective interests of the UK's insurance industry. The association speaks out on issues of common interest, works to inform and participate in debates on public policy issues, and acts as an advocate for high standards of customer service in the insurance industry.

== See also ==
- Insurance Fraud Enforcement Department, funded by Association of British Insurers
- Trade groups in the United Kingdom
- International Underwriting Association
- Lloyd's of London
