= Tower (ward) =

Ward of the City of London

Coordinates: 51.511°N 0.077°W

- Ward
- Location within Greater London
- Tower ward boundaries since 2013
- Population: 227 (2011 Census. Ward)
- OS grid reference: TQ319812
- Sui generis: City of London
- Administrative area: Greater London
- Region: London
- Country: England
- Sovereign state: United Kingdom
- Post town: LONDON
- Postcode district: EC3
- Postcode district: E1
- Dialling code: 020
- Police: City of London
- Fire: London
- Ambulance: London
- UK Parliament: Cities of London and Westminster
- London Assembly: City and East

Tower is one of the 25 wards of the City of London and takes its name from its proximity to the Tower of London. The ward covers the area of the City that is closest to the Tower.

== Overview ==
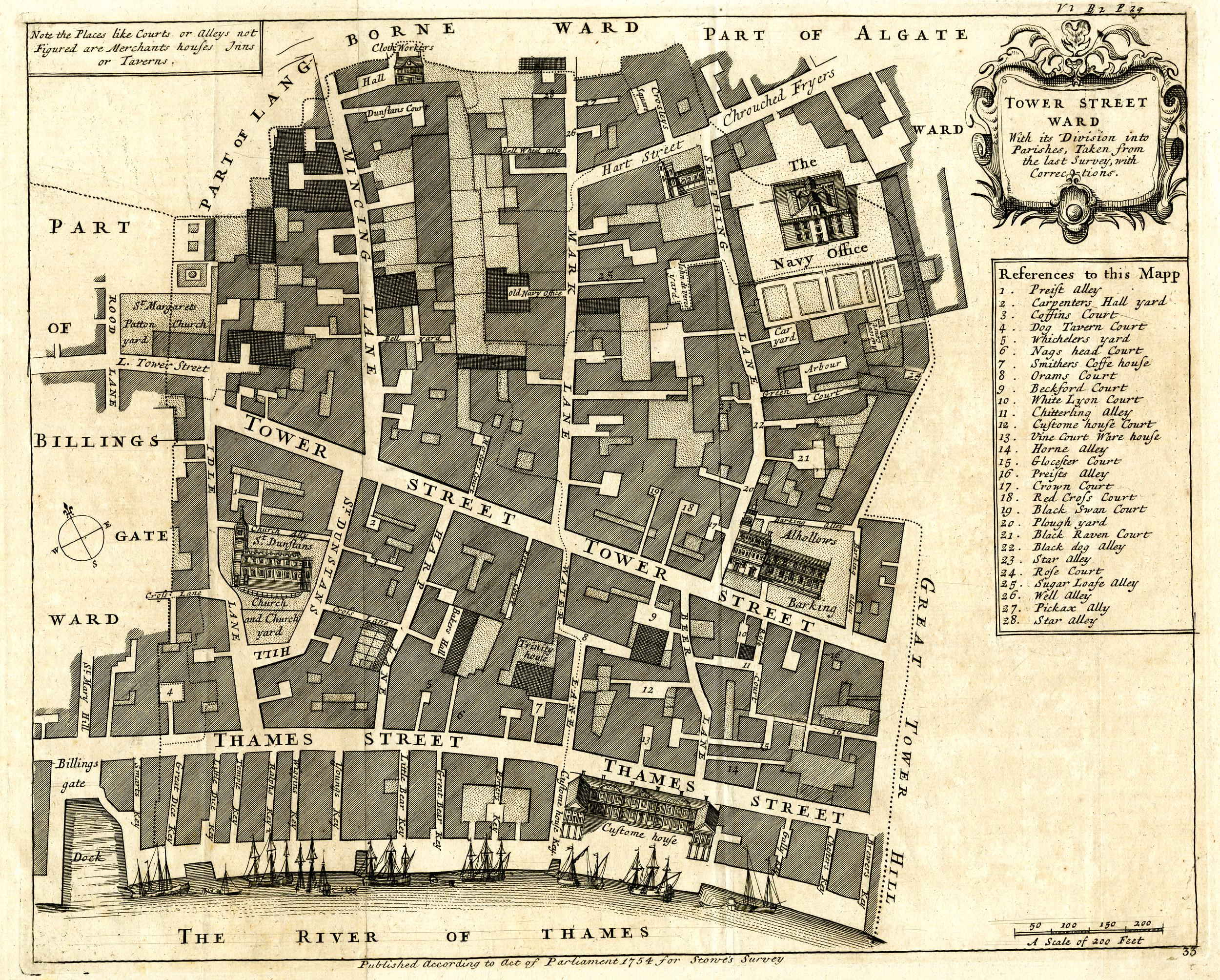
Map of Tower Street Ward, 1755

Prior to boundary changes in 2003, Tower contained all of Great Tower Street and historically was known as "Tower Street" ward. John Leake's 1667 map of the City refers to it as "Tower Street Ward", as does a 1755 map of the ward. However, it lost much ground to neighbouring Billingsgate ward in a 2003 review of ward boundaries, including nearly all of Great Tower Street. It did though gain land to the north of the Tower of London, including Minories. The resident population of the ward is 227 (2011).

Despite its name, the Tower of London has never formed part of the ward or, for that matter, of the wider City of London; it is actually located within the London Borough of Tower Hamlets. Furthermore, Tower Bridge does not fall within the City or Tower ward's boundaries, although the bridge does use the City's logo as it was built by the Bridge House Estates.

== Notable sites ==
Two notable churches are located within Tower ward. All Hallows-by-the-Tower on Byward Street was the church from which Samuel Pepys famously watched the Great Fire of London unfold in September 1666. St Olave Hart Street was remarked by John Betjeman as a country church in the middle of the busiest city on earth. St Dunstan-in-the-East, on St Dunstan's Hill, was largely destroyed during the Blitz of World War II; its ruins and grounds are now a public garden.

Other buildings of note include the old London Corn Exchange (now offices) on Mark Lane, the former Port of London Authority headquarters on Trinity Square (the PLA maintains an office nearby on Harp Lane), and the livery hall of the Worshipful Company of Bakers on Harp Lane.

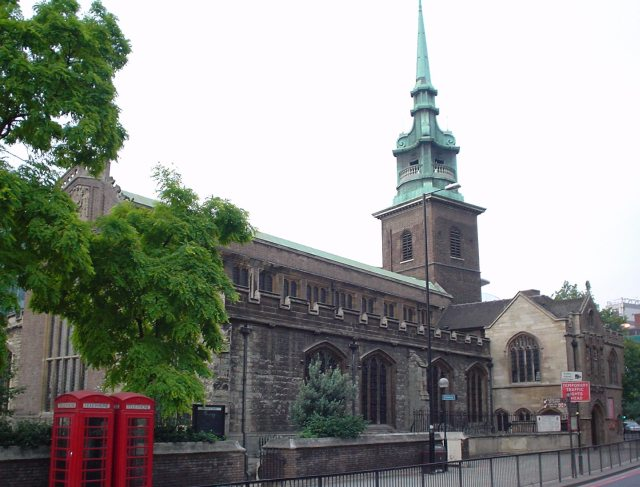
All Hallows-by-the-Tower Church

Fenchurch Street railway station and Tower Gateway DLR station are situated within the ward.

It also contains some notable streets such as Minories; Pepys Street, where the diarist once lived; Savage Gardens, named after Sir Thomas Savage Bt who lived there during the 17th century; Crutched Friars, named after the religious order of the same name whose Italian branch settled there in the 13th century; and America Square, which dates to the 18th century and was dedicated to the American colonies.

== Politics ==
Tower is one of 25 wards in the City of London, each electing an alderman to the Court of Aldermen and commoners (the City equivalent of a councillor) to the Court of Common Council of the City of London Corporation.

Only electors who are freemen of the City of London are eligible to stand.
