= Byward Street =

Street in the City of London

Coordinates: 51°30′35″N 0°04′46″W

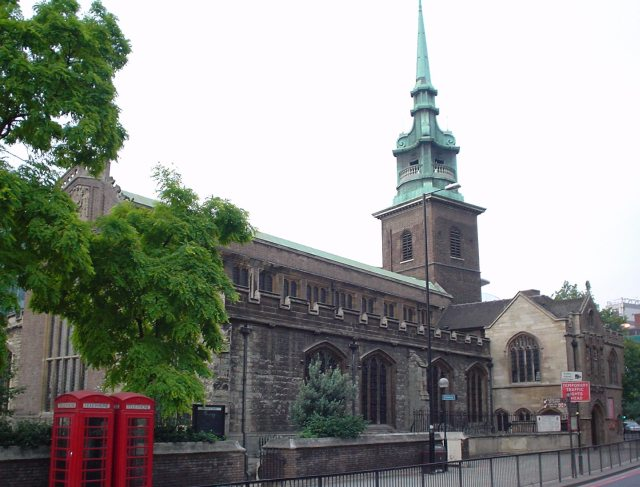
All Hallows-by-the-Tower pictured from Byward Street

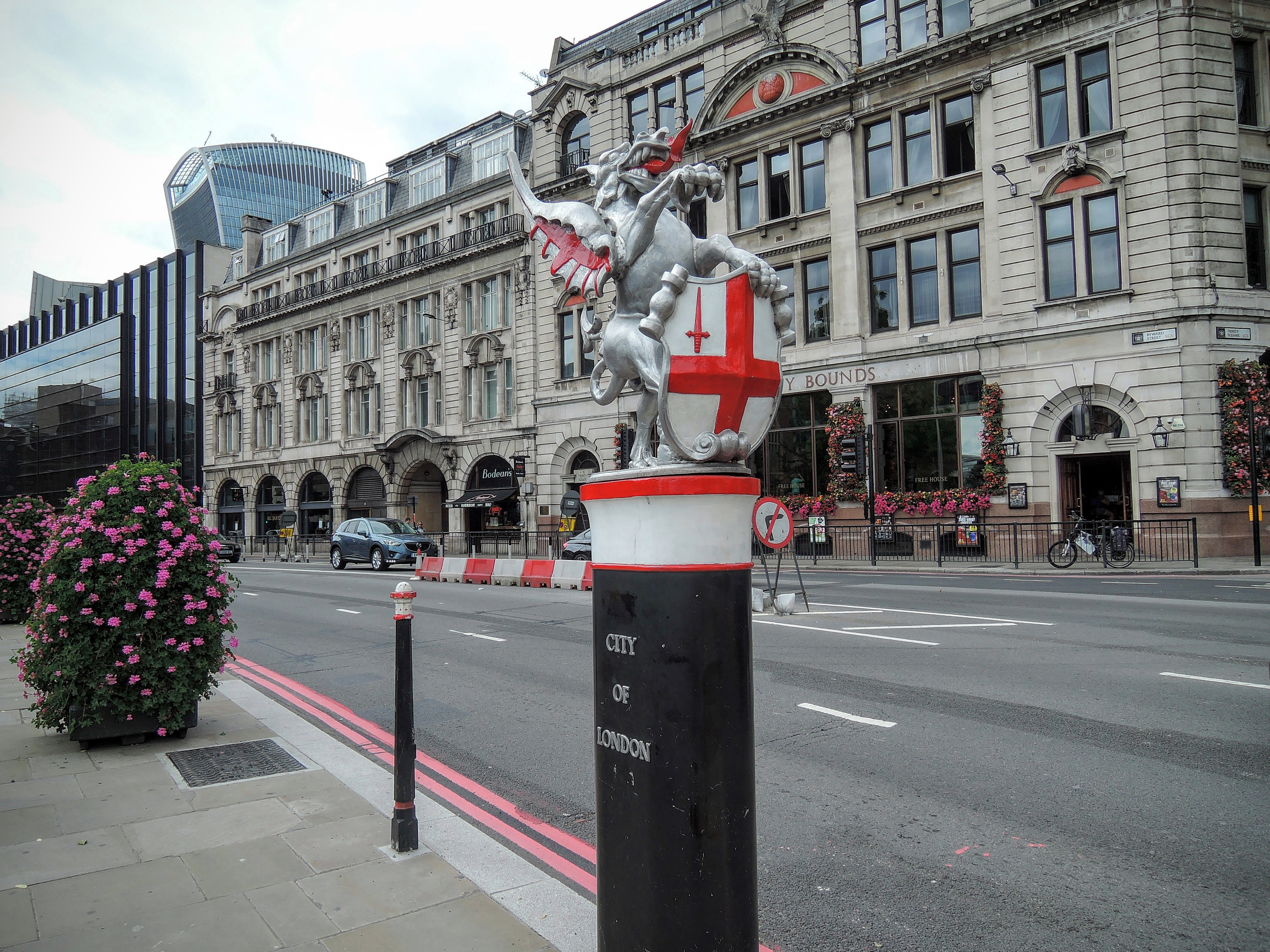
City boundary marker on Byward Street

Byward Street is a road in the City of London, the historic and financial centre of London. It forms part of the A3211 route and, if travelling eastward, is a short continuation of Lower Thames Street from a junction with Great Tower Street, to Tower Hill. It is located within the City ward of Tower.

== History ==
Constructed between 1895 and 1906 through the Met. and Dist. Railways (City Lines and Extensions) Act, 1882, Byward Street replaced the much older Black Swan Court, itself the successor to a Roman foundation. The street originally provided access to the Crown Gate of the Byward Tower, from which it derives its name. The tower itself was so named because it was by the Ward (Warders' Hall; meeting room and residences of the Yeoman Warders). Its close proximity to the Tower of London and the church of All Hallows-by-the-Tower ensure a steady stream of visitors. A number of retail outlets and restaurants also line the street.

Byward Street formed part of the marathon course of the 2012 Olympic and Paralympic Games. The women's Olympic marathon took place on 5 August and the men's on 12 August. The Paralympic marathons were held on 9 September.

== See also ==
Other nearby streets:

- Mark Lane
- Mincing Lane
- Pepys Street
- Savage Gardens
