= James Taylor (tea planter) =

Scottish tea planter (1835–1892)

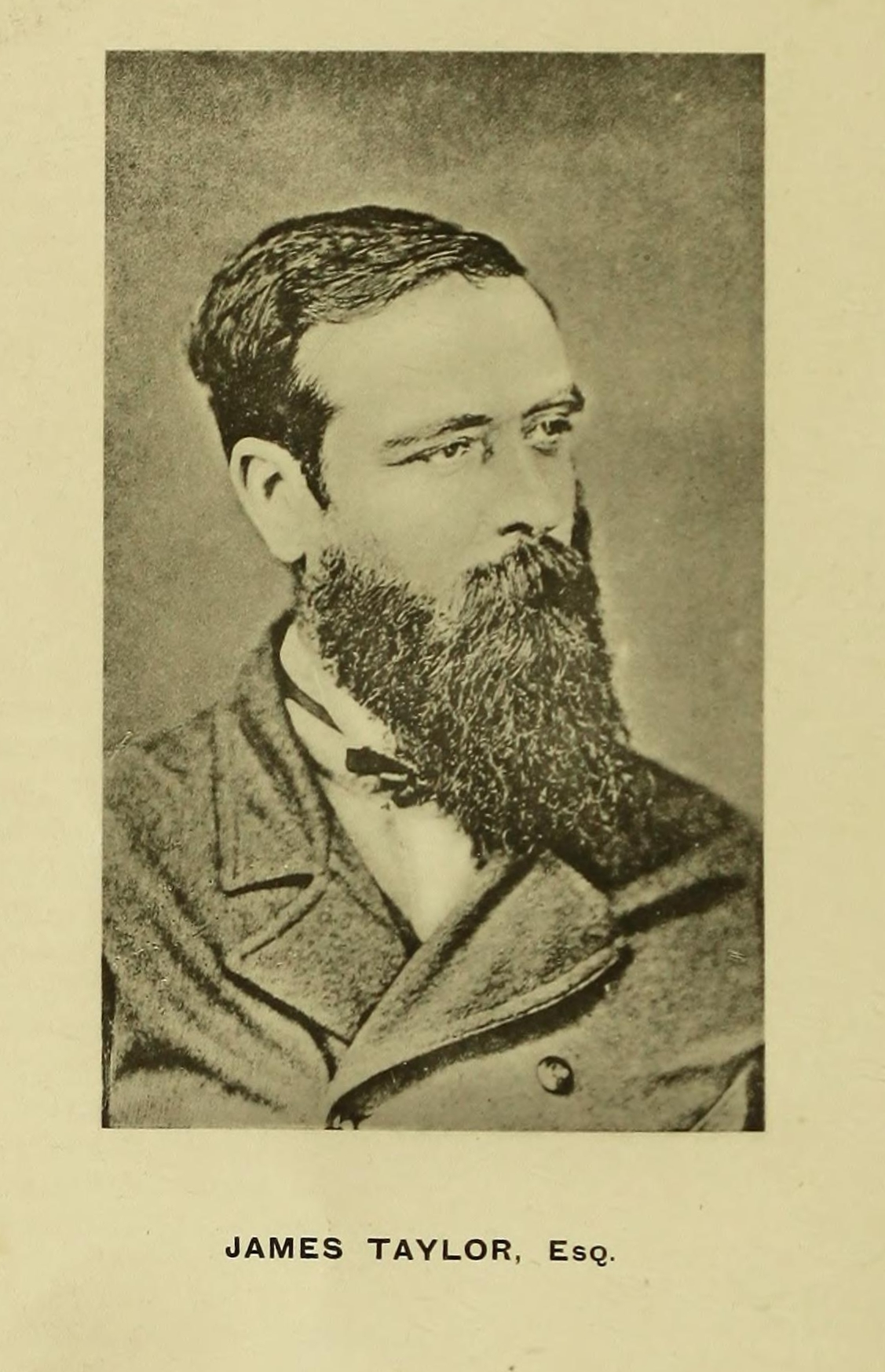
- Born: James Taylor; 29 March 1835; Mosspark, Auchenblae, Kincardineshire, Scotland
- Died: 2 May 1892 (aged 57); Kandy, British Ceylon
- Known for: First tea plantation to British Ceylon (Sri Lanka)

James Taylor (29 March 1835 - 2 May 1892) was a Scottish tea planter who introduced the industry of tea farming to British Ceylon. He arrived in British Ceylon in 1852 and settled down at Loolecondera estate in Delthota. Here he worked with Scottish merchant Thomas Lipton to develop the tea industry in British Ceylon. He continued to live in British Ceylon until his death (more than half of his lifetime).

== Life in Loolecondera ==
Taylor visited India in 1866 to learn the basics of growing tea on plantations; following his return, he started a plantation at Loolecondera estate in Kandy (Sri Lanka - formerly known as Ceylon). He began the tea plantation on an estate of just 7.7 hectares (19 acres) in 1867. He started a fully equipped tea factory on the Loolecondera estate in 1872.

During the period when Taylor lived on the Loolecondera estate, the export of tea increased from 23 pounds to 81 tonnes and in 1890 it reached the level of 22,900 tonnes.

== Achievement ==
In the year 1872 Taylor set about building a larger tea factory in Loolecondera and started manufacturing packeted tea. He had already written about his success in starting a larger tea factory as "I have a machine of my own invention being made in Kandy for rolling tea which I think will be successful". In 1875 Taylor managed to send the first shipment of Ceylon tea to the London Tea Auction.

== Taylor and Lipton ==
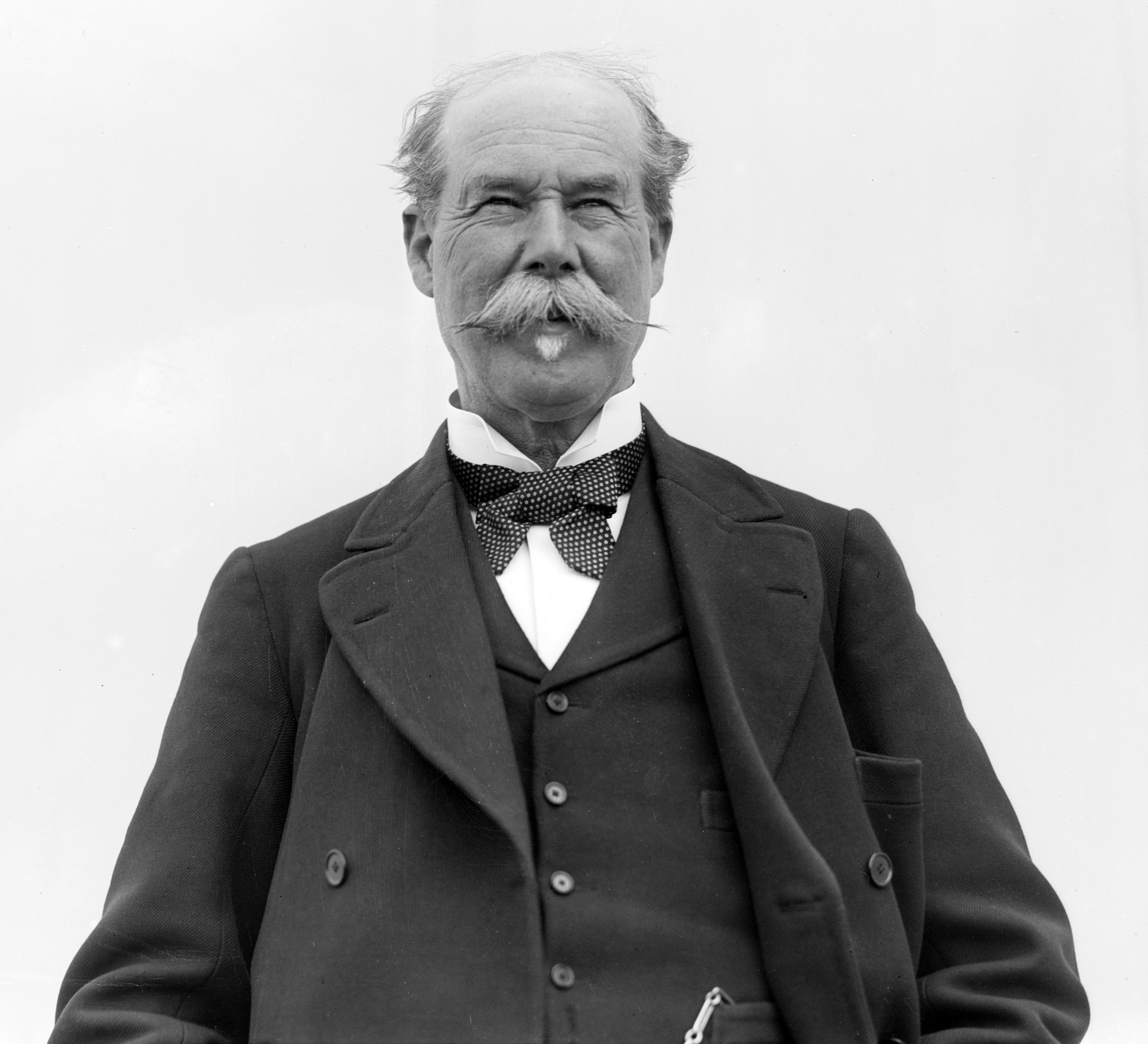
Sir Thomas Johnstone Lipton

Scottish millionaire Thomas Lipton visited British Ceylon (Sri Lanka) in the 1890s, during his journey to Australia, and met Taylor. They discussed the business of exporting tea from British Ceylon. Lipton's company became interested and started buying Ceylon tea.

== Death and after ==
James Taylor in the 1870s

The rapid growth of the Ceylonese tea industry allowed the large tea companies to take over, and therefore the small farmers like Taylor were chased out of the industry. Because of this, Taylor was dismissed by the Loolecondera estate management.

Taylor died in 1892, one year after his dismissal from Loolecondera estate, from severe gastroenteritis and dysentery. His body was buried in the Mahaiyawa Cemetery in Kandy. His headstone reads, "In pious memory of James Taylor of Loolecondera Estate Ceylon, the pioneer of the cinchona and tea enterprise in this island, who died 2 May 1892, aged 57 years".

On Tuesday, 3 May 1892, a day after his death, Taylor's body was taken from the Loolecondera estate for burial at the Mahaiyawa cemetery near Kandy. Two gangs of 12 estate workers reputedly carried Taylor’s body to his final resting place in appreciation of his noble efforts to establish Tea industry in Ceylon. They alternated every four miles during the 18 mile journey. Among neighbours and friends who attended the ceremony were C.E. Bonner, W.J. Scott, Stopford Sackville, Alexander Philip, and several others who had subscribed to Taylor’s silver tea service. Revd Watt read the funeral service.

In 1893, one year after his death, one million packets of Ceylon tea of the first shipment to London were sold at the Chicago World's Fair.

The majority of the tea estates (more than 80 percent) were owned by British companies from the time of James Taylor who began the industry in 1867 until 1971 when the government of Sri Lanka introduced a Land Reform Act which granted the ownership of tea estates to the government (nationalisation of the tea industry).

== Centenary of death ==
John Field, the High Commissioner for the United Kingdom in Sri Lanka made a comment in 1992 for the 100th anniversary of the death of Taylor: "It can be said of very few individuals that their labours have helped to shape the landscape of a country, but the beauty of the hill country as it now appears owes much to the inspiration of James Taylor, the man who introduced tea cultivation to Sri Lanka". A museum was also built in 1992 to commemorate him in the place where he lived.

== James Taylor Monument ==
On Saturday 29 June 2019, the Auchenblae Heritage Society unveiled a statue to commemorate James Taylor.

Designed by Prof. Sarath Chandrajeewa and gifted to the Society by Mr Anselm Perera of Mlesna Teas, Colombo, Sri Lanka, the statue overlooks the Auchenblae Village Square.

== See also ==
- Loolecondera
- Ceylon tea
- Thomas Lipton
- Tea production in Sri Lanka
