= Plantation Place South =

Office building in the City of London

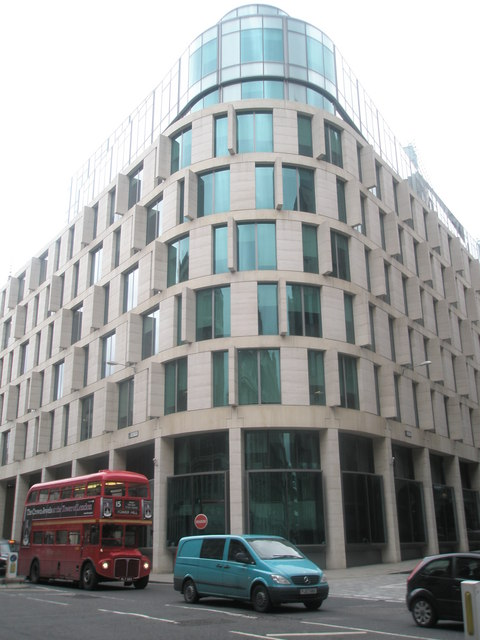
- Plantation Place South viewed from Great Tower Street
- Interactive map of the Plantation Place South area

General information
- Status: Completed
- Location: London, EC3; United Kingdom
- Coordinates: 51.510462°N 0.082633°W
- Construction started: 2002
- Completed: 2004; 22 years ago

Height
- Roof: 41.5 m (136 ft)

Technical details
- Floor count: 9

Plantation Place South is an office building in the City of London. It consists of nine floors and forms part of a complex consisting of the larger 30 Fenchurch Street to the north. The building was designed by the Arup Associates architects' group. Plantation Place South was first proposed as a new area of office development in 2001 and construction work began in 2002; it was completed and opened two years later.

Plantation Place South is located at the corner of Great Tower Street and Mincing Lane, near the Tower of London and Fenchurch Street railway station. Its main entrance and postal address is at 60 Great Tower Street, although workers may also enter the building from Plantation Lane, a pedestrianised alley between 30 Fenchurch Street and Plantation Place South.

Plantation Lane is the home of an art installation, "Time and Tide", created by Simon Patterson. The installation, which is frequently visited and photographed by tourists, chronicles the history of London from times of the Romans to the modern age.

Tenants of Plantation Place South include insurers Arch, AXIS, and Beazley. These insurers operate in what is known as the London Companies' Market, which alongside Lloyd's of London offers large commercial insurance and reinsurance to the global market. The location of the building, within an easy walk of the Lloyd's building and many other brokers and insurers, is an attractive force for the aforementioned companies and others operating within this market. The UK broker-dealer arm of commodities trader Sucden, Sucden Financial, is also a resident of Plantation Place South.

The whole building is estimated to have cost around £120 million to build.
