= 30 Fenchurch Street =

Office building in the City of London

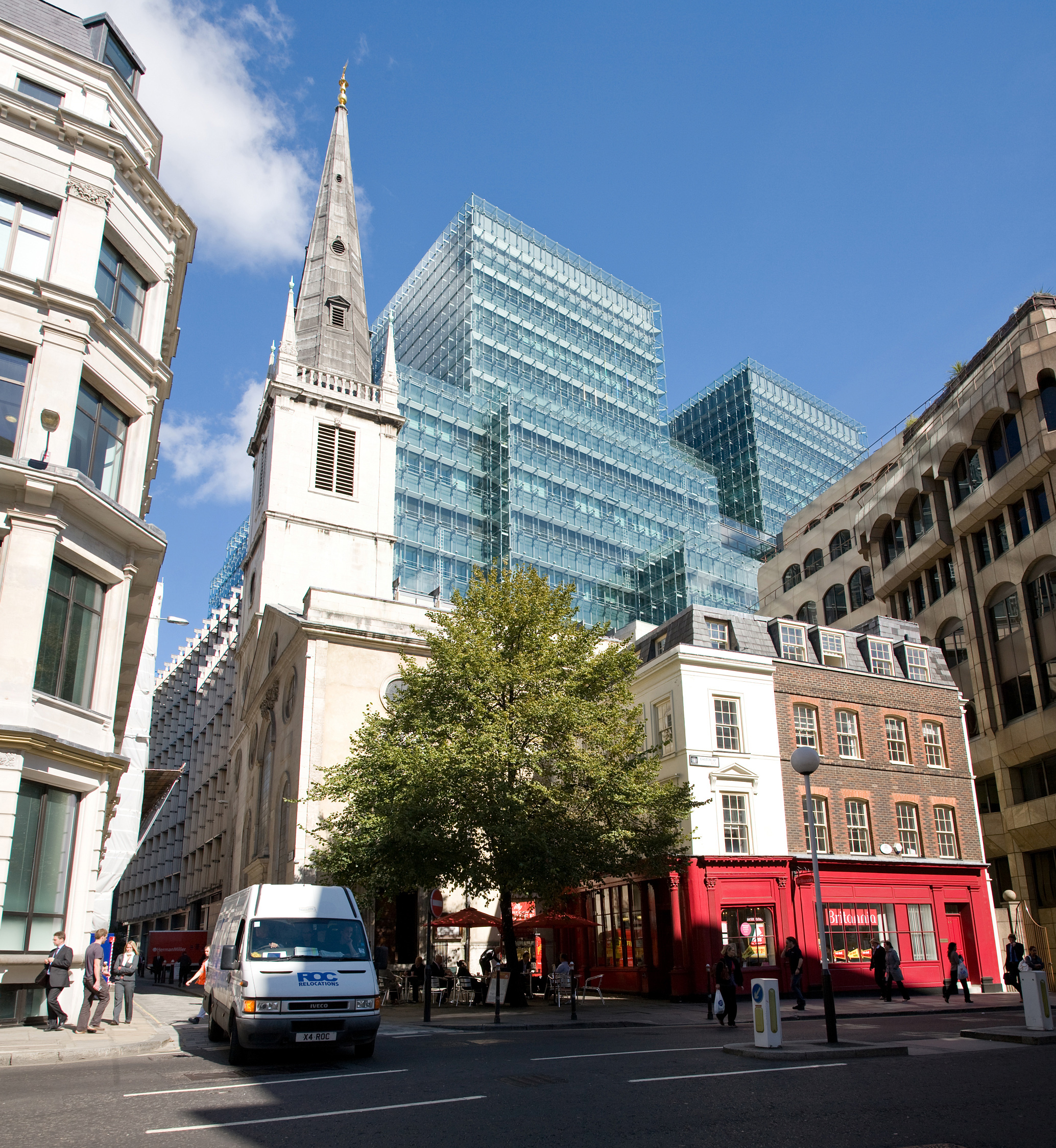
- 30 Fenchurch Street and neighbouring church St Margaret Pattens
- Interactive map of the 30 Fenchurch Street area

General information
- Location: London, EC3; United Kingdom
- Coordinates: 51.5112°N 0.0824°W
- Completed: 2004
- Opening: 2004; 22 years ago

Height
- Roof: 68 m (223 ft)

Technical details
- Floor count: 16 (14 above ground)

30 Fenchurch Street is one of the largest office developments in the City of London, the primary financial district of London. Until October 2020, the building was known as Plantation Place, taking its name from a previous Plantation House, once the world's recognised centre of the tea trade.

Its anchor tenant is Accenture but it is also the headquarters of a number of other consultancy firms, banks and insurance companies, including Aspen Insurance, IQUW, Sedgwick and QBE Insurance. The building occupies almost an entire block of approximately 10,200 sq m, with Fenchurch Street to the north, Mincing Lane to the east, and Rood Lane to the west. It is bounded to the south by its sister building Plantation Place South, which has its main entrance on Great Tower Street. On the other side of Rood Lane is the 40-storey skyscraper 20 Fenchurch Street, completed in August 2014.

The previous building on the site was Plantation House (built in 1935); this served the commodities markets, especially tea and rubber. It was the home of the London Metal Exchange until 1994.

In October 2020, the owner of the development changed its name from Plantation Place in the wake of controversy over the financial district's historic links to slavery. The new name of 30 Fenchurch Street is taken from the first line of the building's postal address.

The complex contains almost 3,000 sq m of roof gardens, offering views of London's skyline. In September 2004, these roof gardens were opened to the public as part of the Open House London weekend.

Arup Associates were the architects, mechanical engineers and structural engineers for a series of buildings on the site constructed in 2004. The site is the location of the remains of the old Roman settlement of Londinium, burned down by Boudica in AD 60. A hoard of gold coins from the 2nd century was found on the site.

== See also ==
- List of tallest buildings and structures in London
- Ove Arup
