= IUA =

IUA may refer to:

- International Underwriting Association
- International University of Africa
- Irish Union Association
- Irish Unionist Alliance
- Irish Universities Association
- ISDN User Adaptation, one of the protocols in the SIGTRAN family
- Interactive User Access CATIA (V4)
- Intrauterine adhesions (Asherman's syndrome)
