= Savage Garden (disambiguation) =

Savage Garden was an Australian rock band.

Savage Garden may also refer to:

- Savage Garden (Savage Garden album), 1997
- Savage Garden (The 69 Eyes album) or the title song, 1995
- The Savage Garden (novel), a 2007 novel by Mark Mills
- The Savage Garden: Cultivating Carnivorous Plants, a 1998 book by Peter D'Amato

== See also ==
- Godless Savage Garden, a 1998 album by Dimmu Borgir
- Savage Gardens, a minor street in the City of London
