= Insurance Fraud Enforcement Department =

City of London Police task force

The Insurance Fraud Enforcement Department, or IFED for short, is a task force formed by the City of London Police that tracks criminals who commit insurance fraud. The task force was founded in 2012 and is funded by a consortium of British and European insurance companies, including the Association of British Insurers, for £9 million during its first three years.

The IFED have been featured several times on BBC One's Claimed and Shamed.

== See also ==
- National Insurance Crime Bureau
