= Loolecondera =

Tea plantation estate in Sri Lanka

Designations

Archaeological Protected Monument of Sri Lanka
- Designated: 6 June 2008
- Protected: The well, stone seat, and tea kiln used by James Taylor and belonging to the Loolkandura Tea Estate

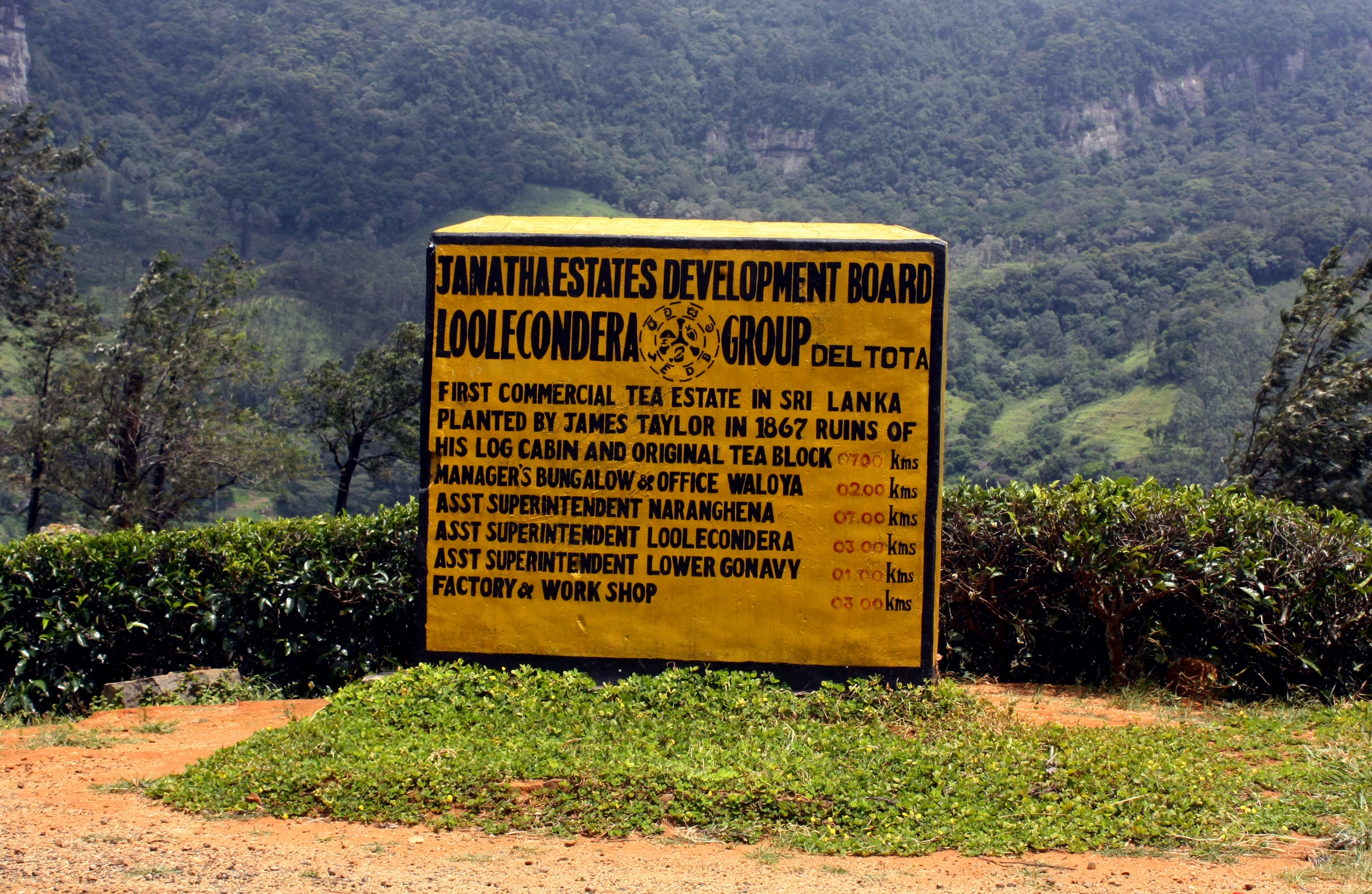
The name board of the Loolecondera estate, Kandy, Sri Lanka.

The Loolecondera estate was the first tea plantation estate in Sri Lanka, established in 1867 by Scotsman James Taylor. The estate is located 35 km (22 mi) southeast of Kandy, Sri Lanka.

== History ==
The Loolecondera estate was purchased from the Crown by James Joseph Mackenzie in 1841 to establish a coffee plantation. The estate lay between 900 and 1,500 m (3,000 and 4,900 ft) above sea level and was covered in dense forest, which was not cleared for a decade. In October 1852, 17-year-old James Taylor arrived in Ceylon, having signed up as an assistant supervisor with George Pride for three years. Upon his arrival he was sent to Loolecondera, under the supervision of a Mr. Williams. By 1857 he was the manager of Loolecondera.

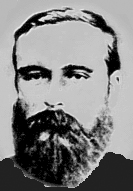
James Taylor in Kandy, Sri Lanka in 1860s

In the late 1860s coffee plantations across the island were devastated by the fungal disease Hemileia vastatrix, also known as coffee leaf rust. Coffee plantations were forced to diversify.

In 1865 Taylor began experimenting with planting cinchona. In 1865, on the instructions of the owners of the estate, he acquired Chinese tea seeds from the Peradeniya Botanical Gardens; these were planted along the sides of the roads and in the paths through the coffee plantation. In 1867 Taylor cleared 7.7 hectares (19 acres) of land on the estate and planted the first tea plantation, using Assam hybrid tea seeds. By that time Loolecondera had become the property of Messrs. Harrison and Leake, the partners of the firm of Keir Dundas & Co., Kandy.

In 1872, he started a tea factory with his latest invention of the tea leaves cutting machine.

He spent most of his life in Loolecondera until his death in 1892.

Some of the early equipment used by Taylor at Loolecondera has been relocated and are displayed at the Ceylon Tea Museum, housed in the former Hanthana Tea Factory.

== Etymology ==
Loolecondera is a corruption into British English of the native name "Lool kandura" (ලූල් කඳුර in Sinhala). Loolkandura means "the stream full of loola fish" (Channa striata).

== See also ==
- James Taylor (Ceylon)
- Ceylon tea
- Thomas Lipton
