= Mincing Lane =

Street in the City of London

Coordinates: 51°30′39″N 0°04′54″W

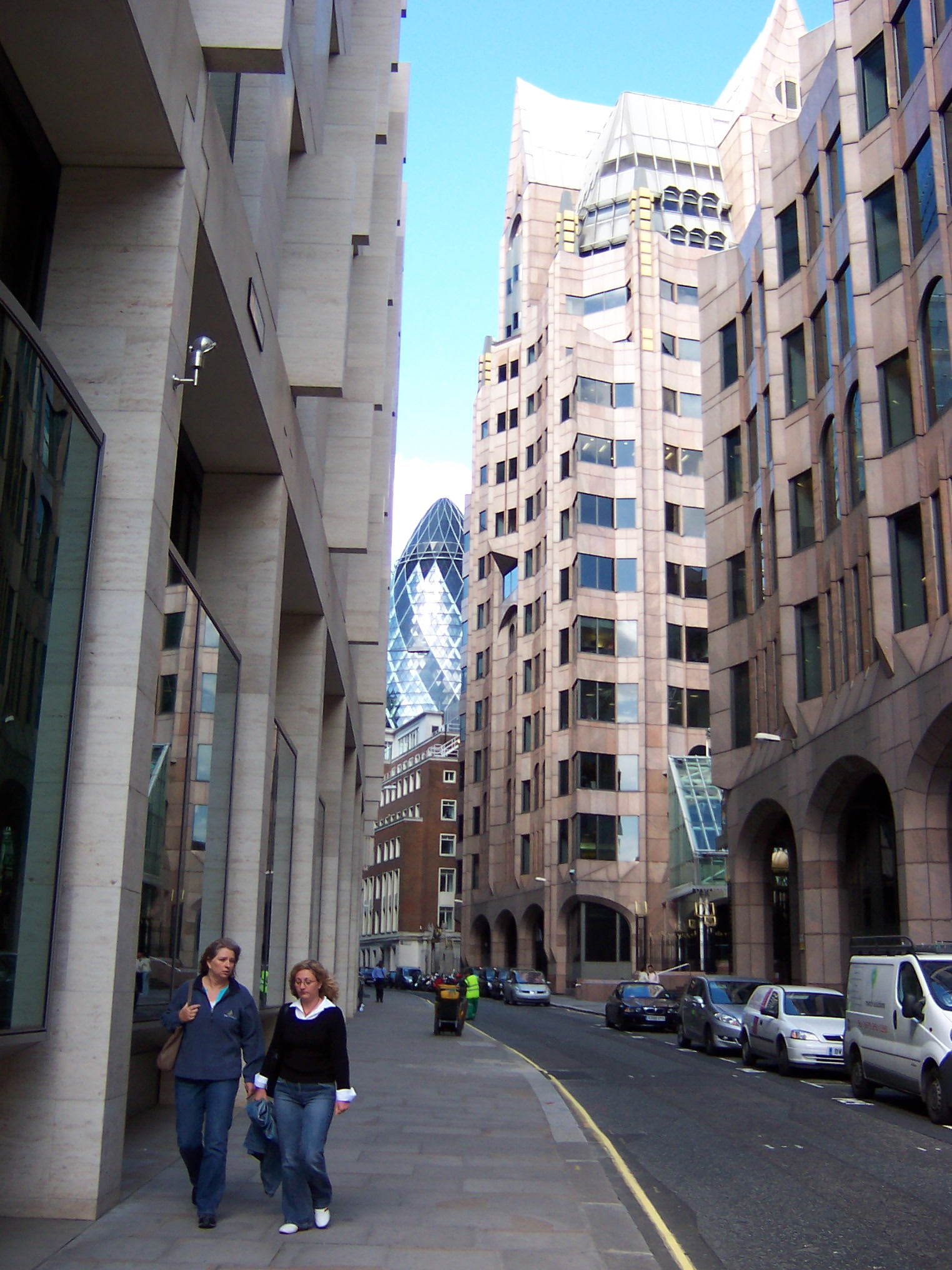
- Looking north up Mincing Lane, with Minster Court on the right and 30 St Mary Axe in the background
- Interactive map of Mincing Lane
- Length: 0.1 mi (0.16 km)
- Location: London, United Kingdom
- Postal code: EC3
- Nearest Tube station: Monument
- North end: Fenchurch Street
- To: Great Tower Street

Mincing Lane is a short one-way street in the City of London linking Fenchurch Street to Great Tower Street. In the late 19th century it was the world's leading centre for tea and spice trading.

== Etymology ==
Its name is a corruption of Mynchen Lane, so-called from the tenements held there by the Benedictine mynchens or nuns of the nearby St Helen's Bishopsgate church (from Minicen, Anglo-Saxon for a nun; minchery, a nunnery).

A Dictionary of London by Henry A. Harben (1918) describes it as follows:

Mincing Lane

North out of Great Tower Street to Fenchurch Street at No. 42 (P.O. Directory). In Tower and Langbourn Wards.
Earliest mention: "Menechinelane," 1273-4 (Ct. H.W. I. 17).
Other forms of name: "Mengenelane," 1290-1 (ib. 95). "Mangonelane," 1291 (ib. 96). "Monechenelane," 1291 (ib. 101). "Menchenelane," 1294-5 (ib. 119). "Manionelane," 1295 (ib. 121) and 1311 (Cal. L. Bk. D. p. 77). "Menchonelane," 1304 (Ct. H.W. I. 162). "Manchonlane," 1306-7 (ib. 184). "Menionelane," 1312 (ib. 230). "Mangonelane," 1320 (ib. 288). "Mengonelane," 1321 (ib. 292). "Mengeoneslane," 1324 (ib. 309). "Mengeonlane," 1330 (ib. 361). "Myniounlane," 1349 (ib. 577). "Munchenlane," 1348-9 (ib. 528). "Monechunelane," 1349 (ib. 553). "Manchonelane," 36 Ed. III. (Ch. I. p.m. pt. 2, 71). "Minchonlane," 1393 (Ct. H.W. II. 299). "Mynchenlane," 1398-9 (ib. 337). "Mynchyn lane," 28 H. VIII. (Lond. I. p.m. Lond. and Midd. Arch. Soc. VII. (p. 55). "Mynsing Lane," 1601 (H. MSS. Com. Salisbury, XI. 315).
The A.S. word "mynechenu" = female of "munuc" = monk.
Halliwell in his Dictionary of Archaic and Provincial Words gives "Minch" = a nun, and it is suggested that this street derives its name through this word from the A.S. "mynechenu," the "mynchens" or nuns of St. Helens who held property there.
At the north-eastern end of this lane remains of a Roman bath, hypocaust, etc., have been found, and Roman pavements on the western side of the street.

In addition, the entry "Mngenelane" in Harben's Dictionary suggests "Mngenelane = Mengenelane".

== History ==
It was for some years the world's leading centre for tea and spice trading after the British East India Company successfully took over all trading ports from the Dutch East India Company in 1799. It was also the centre of the British opium business (comprising 90% of all transactions), as well as other drugs in the 18th century. Businesses in the British slave trade, such as Hibbert, Purrier and Horton (founded 1770), were based in Mincing Lane.

It was mentioned by Round the Horne radio show scriptwriters, who regularly used the proper noun word 'Mincing' in the Polari-Adjectival sense, meaning an effeminate, male gait.

In 1834, when the East India Company ceased to be a commercial enterprise, and tea became a 'free trade' commodity, tea auctions were held in the London Commercial Salerooms on Mincing Lane. Tea merchants established offices in and around the street, earning it the nickname 'Street of Tea'.

A notable building is the livery hall of the Worshipful Company of Clothworkers. The current building, opened in 1958, is the sixth to stand on the site; the fourth was burnt down in the Great Fire of London and the fifth was destroyed during the Blitz of World War II.

A modern landmark partly bounded by Mincing Lane is Plantation Place, completed in 2004, and its sister building Plantation Place South.

== Minster Court ==
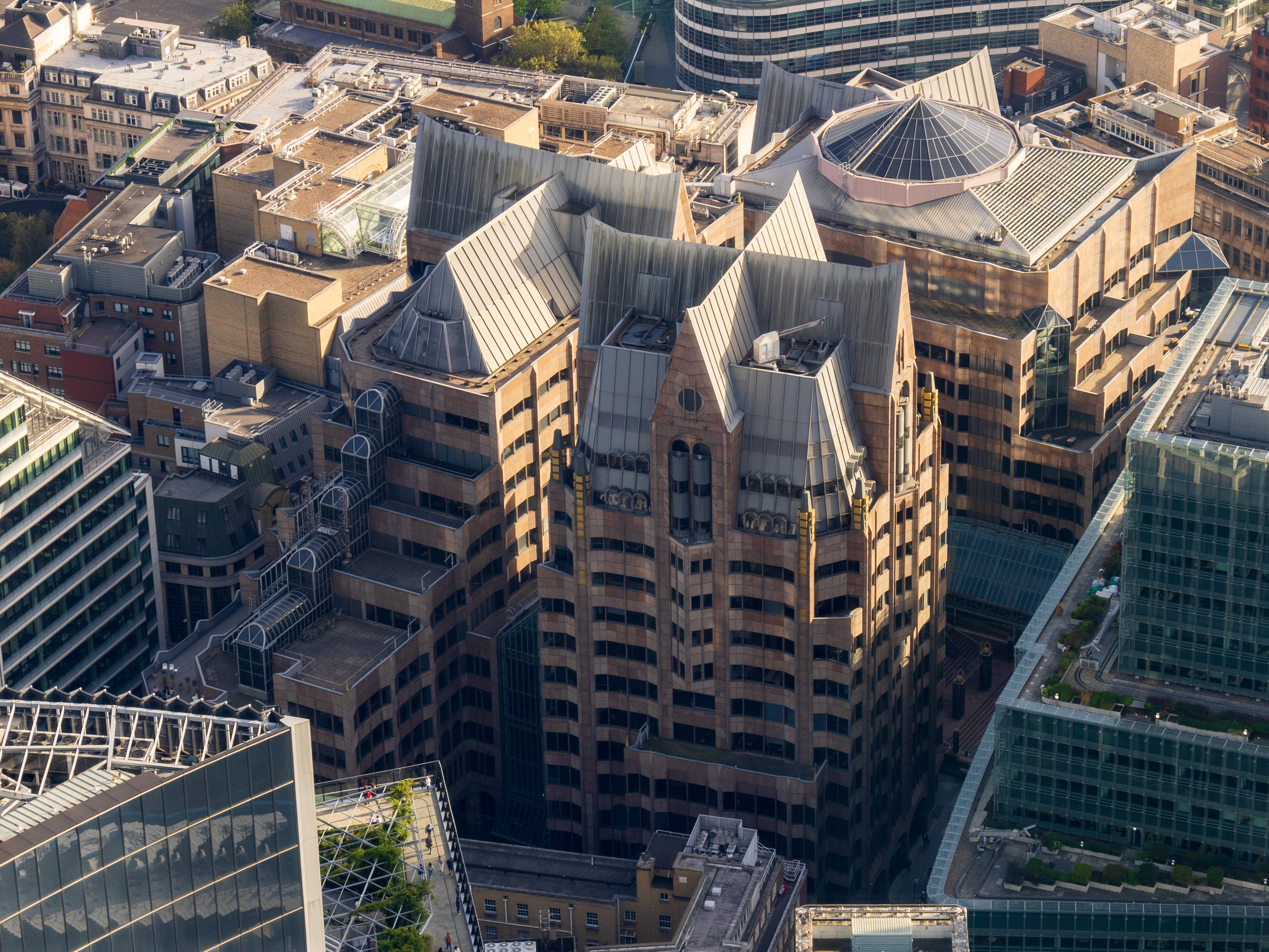
Minster Court viewed from 22 Bishopsgate

Minster Court is a complex of three office buildings, completed between 1991 and 1992 and designed by architects GMW Partnership. During the final phase of fitting-out on 7 August 1991, there was a fire in the atrium of No. 3 Minster Court which caused a serious delay in completion, and over £100 million worth of damage. The London Underwriting Centre was situated at No. 3 Minster Court, and was an underwriting room that was run parallel to the Lloyd's of London underwriting room. The centre was notable for its hanging escalators, consisting of Europe's largest free-standing escalator bank. In 2016, the centre was closed, the escalators were removed, and the building was redeveloped into offices.

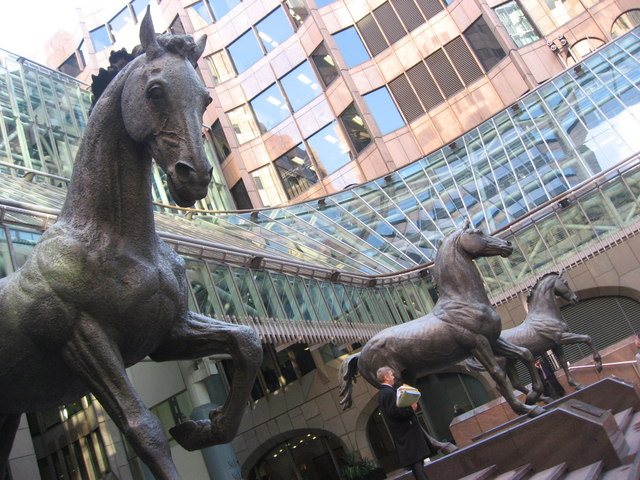
Horse sculptures by Althea Wynne

The building is pink granite and marble, in a neo-gothic or "postmodern-gothic" style. It has many sharp-pointed corners, and is sometimes called "Dracula's Castle". In the forecourt, on Mincing Lane, are three bronze horses which are each over 3 metres tall, sculpted by Althea Wynne; they have been nicknamed Dollar, Yen and Sterling.

Minster Court appeared briefly in Disney's 1996 live-action film 101 Dalmatians as the exterior of Cruella De Vil's haute couture fashion house, "House of DeVil". It also appeared as the location of the architectural practice of Peter Manson (played by Trevor Eve) in the 2010 remake of Bouquet of Barbed Wire. The stairs leading to the forecourt also appeared briefly in the 1999 music video for the song "Coffee & TV" by the British rock band Blur.

In 2024 the building's owners, M&G Real Estate, announced plans to modify the exterior and add additional floors of office space. Attempts to list it in order to preserve its appearance were unsuccessful. The Twentieth Century Society said that the City of London "will be so much the poorer and blander without its theatrical slice of Gotham on the skyline".
