= London Tea Auction =

Tea auction in London, England

The London Tea Auction was a candle auction held on a regular basis for over 300 years, from 1679 until 29 June 1998. The auction in London turned the city into an international hub for the tea industry. The East India Company held the first auction in Leadenhall Street. In 1834, after the East India Company went out of business, the auction was held on Mincing Lane.

To the uninitiated a Tea sale appears to be a mere arena in which the comparative strength of the lungs of a portion of his Majesty´s subjects are to be tried. No one could for an instant suspect the real nature of the business for which the assemblage was congregated...
