= Sucden =

French commodity broker

- Native name: Sucres et Denrées Group
- Type: Private
- Industry: Financial services
- Founded: 1952
- Founder: Maurice Varsano and Jacques Roboh
- Headquarters: Paris, France
- Services: Commodity broker, Sugar, Ethanol, Cocoa, Coffee
- Number of employees: 5,000
- Website: www.sucden.com

Sucden (Sucres et Denrées) is a French-based commodity broker of soft commodities and other financial products headquartered in Paris. The firm started as a sugar broker and is now amongst the world leaders with a market share of around 15% in volume (as of 2016), or 9.5 million tonnes. It has offices around the world, including London and Hong Kong.

== History ==
The company was founded in Paris in 1952 as Sucres et Denrées by Maurice Varsano and Jacques Roboh, who had started as sugar sellers in Morocco after World War II.

In the 2000s, the company expanded into Russia, and began dealing in softs such as cocoa, coffee, and ethanol.

It acquired the New York City-based Coffee Americas in 2014 and the Amsterdam-based Nedcoffee in 2015.

== Subsidiaries ==
=== Sucden Financial ===
Sucden Financial
- Type: Subsidiary
- Industry: Financial services
- Founded: 1973
- Founder: Maurice Varsano
- Headquarters: London, United Kingdom
- Key people: Marc Bailey, Michael Overlander
- Services: Brokerage firm Derivative (finance) Foreign exchange
- Parent: Sucden
- Website: www.sucdenfinancial.com

Sucden Financial is Sucden's London-based multi-asset execution, clearing and liquidity provider for FX, fixed income and commodity instruments. Sucden Financial's parent is Sucden, a company incorporated in France. The group's main activity is sugar trading,

Sucden Financial is a member of the world's major commodities exchanges, is one of only 9 Ring-Dealing members on the London Metal Exchange and is able to deal in virtually all commodity and financial futures and options contracts, as well as foreign exchange and fixed income.

Clients trade financial derivative contracts on agricultural commodities such as sugar, coffee, cocoa, cotton and grains and oil seeds, industrial commodities such as base metals, steel, iron ore and energy, precious metals to foreign exchange and other financial instruments.

=== Other subsidiaries ===
- Sucden Côte d'Ivoire
- Sucden cocoa Nigeria
- Sucden Americas corp
- Coffee America (USA) corporation
- General Cocoa Company (genco)
- Sucden Mexico
- Sucden do Brasil
- Sucden Recife
- Sucden Argentina
- Sucden Chile
- Sucden Peru
- Sucden Asia
- Sucden China
- Sucden India pvt. ltd.
- Sucden Malaysia
- Sucden Thailand
- Sucden Philippines
- Nedcommodities India
- Sucden Coffee Indonesia (formerly known as NedCoffee Indonesia)
- NedCoffee Vietnam
- Sucden Paris
- Sucden Geneva
- Sucden Italia
- Sucden Russia
- Nedcoffee B.V.
- Sucden Financial limited
- Sucden Middle East

== Controversy ==
In February 2026, an open-source investigation by Arte, Mediapart, and RFI reported allegations that several Sucden-linked facilities in Russia may have provided equipment for weaving camouflage nets, rubber strips and mats to protect armored vehicles from drones, vehicles with anti-drone coverings, and fundraising for frontline needs, under the Lipetsk Oblast’s "Lipetsk Industry for Victory" program, in the context of the Russo-Ukrainian War. Sucden denied any involvement in military support activities, and stated it complies with applicable regulations.
