= Great Tower Street =

Street in the City of London

Coordinates: 51°30′35.8″N 0°4′53″W

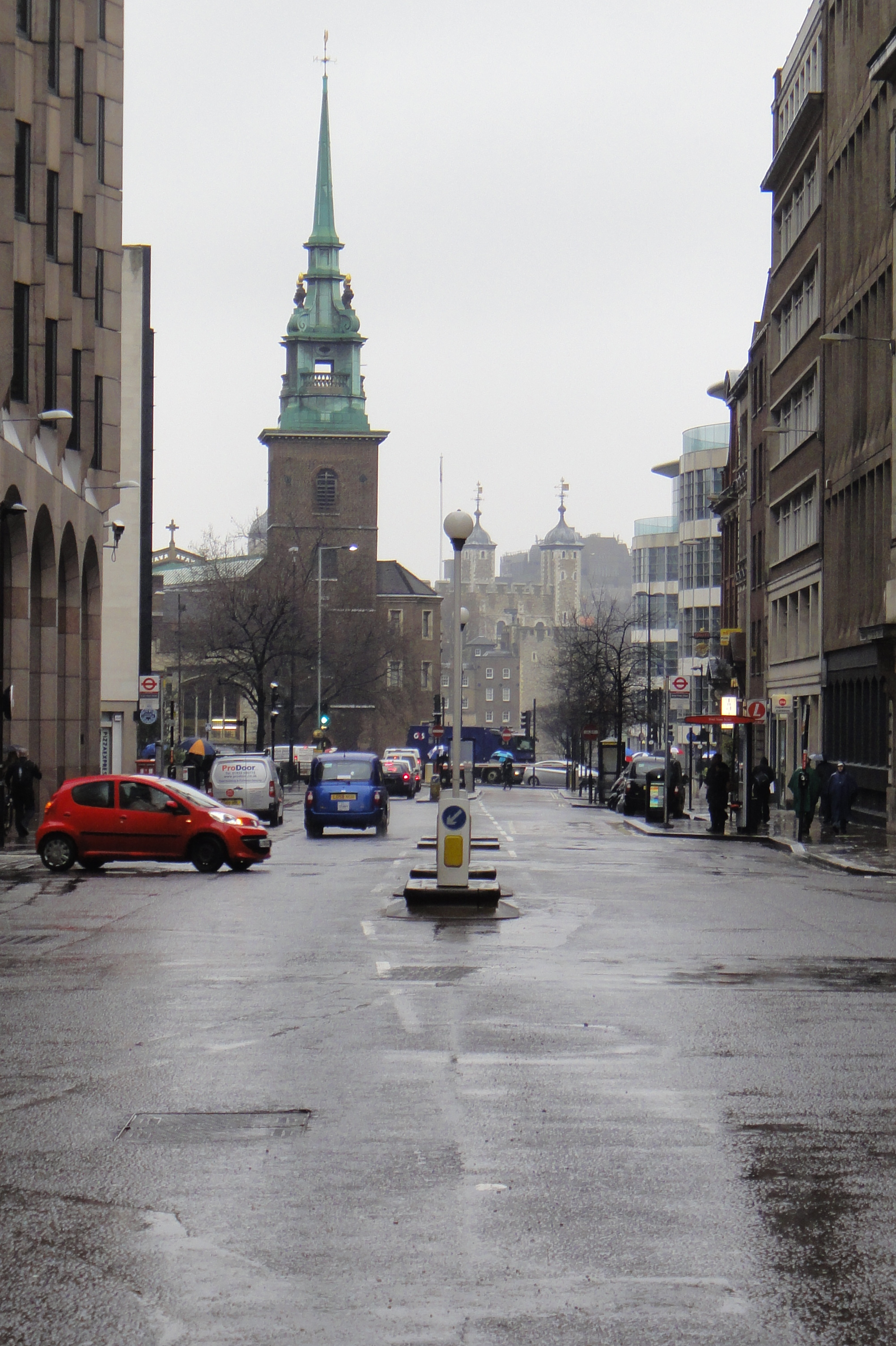
Great Tower Street, looking towards All Hallows-by-the-Tower and Tower of London

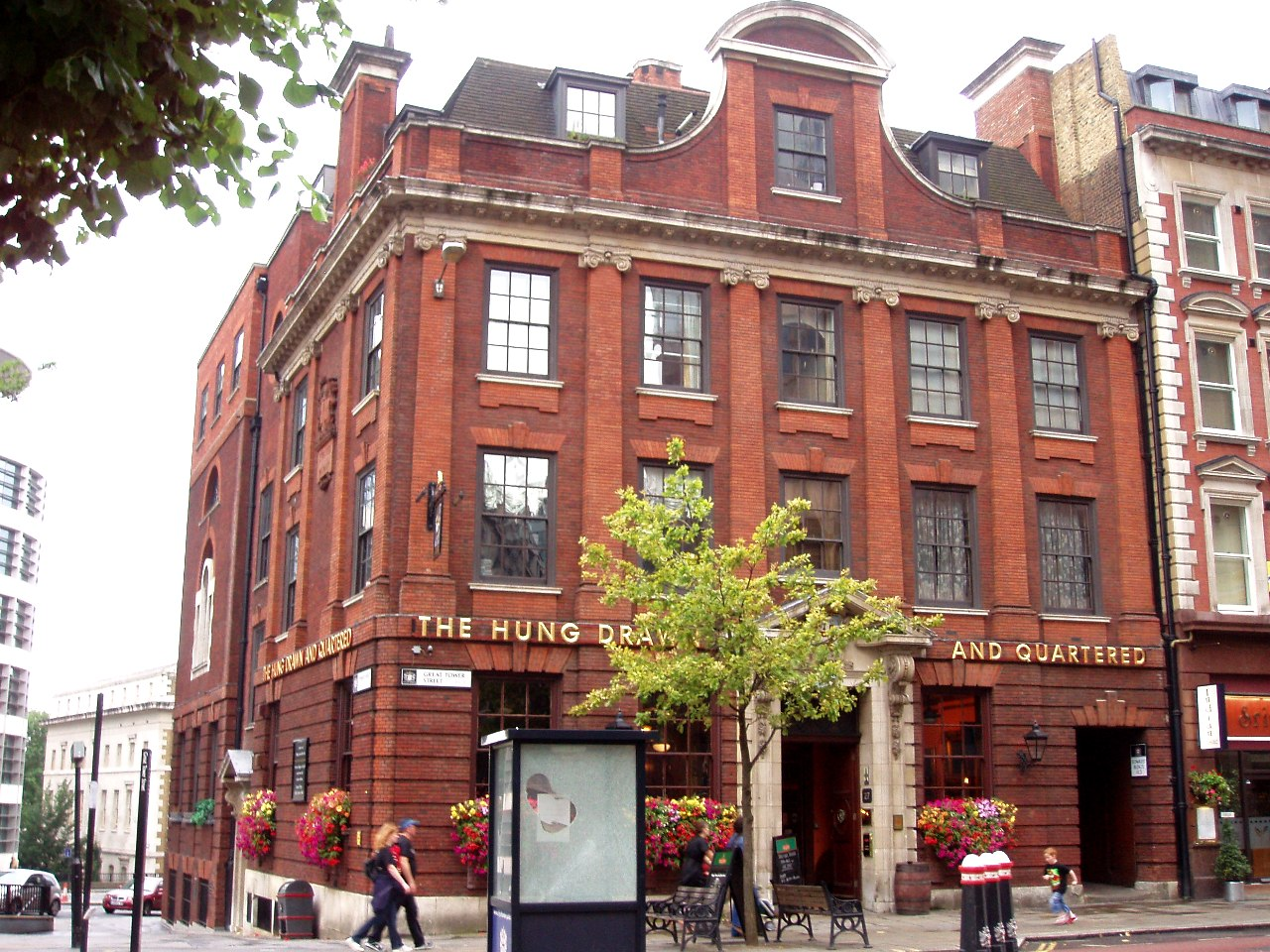
The Hung Drawn and Quartered, a traditional pub on Great Tower Street. The name alludes to the fate of traitors to be hanged, drawn and quartered at nearby Tower Hill.

Great Tower Street, originally known just as Tower Street, is a street in the City of London, the historic nucleus and modern financial centre of London, England. It forms an eastern continuation of Eastcheap starting at Idol Lane, and leads towards Byward Street and Tower Hill. On Byward Street, opposite Great Tower Street, is the historic church All Hallows-by-the-Tower.

== History and buildings ==
A public house called the Czar's Head used to stand at No. 48, so named because Peter the Great used to drink there when he was learning shipbuilding at Deptford. Somewhere on Tower Street in 1688, Edward Lloyd opened Lloyd's Coffee House, where the insurance market Lloyd's of London originated. In 1691, Lloyd relocated his shop to nearby Lombard Street; today Lloyd's is based on Lime Street.

Great Tower Street is home to a number of restaurants and offices, including the southern entrance to No. 3 Minster Court, and Plantation Place South.

It formed part of the marathon course of the 2012 Olympic and Paralympic Games. The women's Olympic marathon took place on 5 August and the men's on 12 August. The Paralympic marathons were held on 9 September.

== Governance ==
Prior to boundary changes in 2003, Great Tower Street formed the centre of the City ward of Tower. Today it lies mostly in Billingsgate ward, but a short portion of the easternmost end of the street is still within Tower ward.

== Transport ==
The nearest London Underground stations are Monument and Tower Hill and the closest mainline railway station is Fenchurch Street.
