= International Underwriting Association =

International Underwriting Association of London
- Abbreviation: IUE
- Predecessor: London International Insurance and Reinsurance Market Association and the Institute of London Underwriters
- Established: 1998; 28 years ago
- Type: Trade association
- Legal status: Association
- Purpose: Representing the non Lloyd's insurance and reinsurance industry in the London market.
- Location: London, United Kingdom
- Region served: Worldwide
- Products: Lobbying, advocating for the industry
- Official language: English
- Website: www.iua.co.uk

The International Underwriting Association (IUA) of London is a trade association that represents companies that trade in the London insurance market outside Lloyd's of London. They include branches or subsidiaries of nearly all the world's largest international insurance and reinsurance companies.

As of 2009, members of the association wrote a total of at least £10 billion premium, a figure that does not include income processed outside the London market bureau. This business is wholesale, the bulk being made up of insurance for large multinational companies or reinsurance. Most of it is international, brought into London by brokers.

The IUA provides a forum for discussing market issues and providing technical support to practitioners. IUA members collectively own a 25% share of Xchanging Ins-sure Services (XIS), the provider of back office processing services to the London market.

== History ==
The IUA was formed in January 1998 from the merger of the London International Insurance and Reinsurance Market Association (LIRMA) and the Institute of London Underwriters (ILU). The main stated reason for the merger was the desire to give the London company market a single voice in dealings with government, regulators and other insurance bodies. Since the ILU had been formed in 1884, the IUA can claim to go back more than a century.

The association has always made reform of the London market a top priority, especially the replacement of out-of-date processes and increased use of technology to conduct business. This led in 1999 to the creation of the IUA-Lloyd's Forum. This soon expanded to include brokers and eventually evolved into the London Market Group, which is still active today.

== Aims and priorities ==
The IUA's mission is “To promote and enhance the business environment for international insurance and reinsurance companies operating in or through London”. How this mission is interpreted has evolved over the years. From being a mainly strategic and lobbying organisation, it has become more concerned with activities that provide direct support to market professionals in their work. In 2009, the association set itself four strategic priorities:

- Improving the efficiency of doing business in London;
- Advancing the development of market expertise and innovation;
- Influencing public policy and compliance developments;
- Fostering relationships with the broking community and other client-related stakeholders.

== Other activities ==
The IUA holds regular lunchtime briefings and organises a number of events, most notably an annual catastrophe modelling conference, which normally attracts an international cast of speakers and delegates. It also supports an annual marine claims conference in Dublin. Its website has become an important communications tool and a repository of market statistics and other information.

== Membership ==
IUA member companies come overwhelmingly from outside the United Kingdom, reflecting the globalisation of the insurance and reinsurance industries. As of 2011, thirty eight of the IUA's forty members were based overseas or part of larger overseas groups. This external influence is reflected in the nationality of many of its board members. Around a third of IUA members also have operations at the Lloyd's as part of the growing inter-relationship of the two main parts of the London market.

As well as Ordinary Membership, there are two other categories: Associate (for active insurance companies that do not operate in London but wish to have an association with the IUA); and Affiliate (for other organisations with an interest in the insurance and reinsurance market). Membership is always granted on a corporate rather than individual basis.

The number of Ordinary member companies dropped by around 50% in the first five years of the association's existence even as their aggregate premium income increased, reflecting the consolidation of the company insurance market into fewer, larger players. Numbers have remained stable for several years with departures from the market being balanced by new arrivals.

== Committee structure ==
The IUA board is elected by the membership. Reporting to the board are the committees, sub-committees and working parties, which provide the backbone of the association. These are populated overwhelmingly by market practitioners with the full-time IUA secretariat providing administrative support and implementing decisions (see chart).

These committees responsibilities include for overseeing and supporting: the IUA's contribution to the London market modernisation programme; discussion with regulators and legislators and communicating the implications of regulatory changes to the membership; education, training and research; and technical matters relating to underwriting and claims, including specialist classes of insurance and reinsurance.

IUA committees co-operate regularly with their counterparts at the Lloyd's Market Association and the two organisations jointly run a number of marine insurance and energy insurance committees. Although most of its committees and sub-committees are populated by people working for IUA companies, some such as Digital Risk and Rehabilitation have cross-market membership.
