= Crosswall =

Street in the City of London

Coordinates: 51°30′41.6″N 0°4′36″W

Crosswall is a street in the City of London.

At its western end, the street begins at a junction with Crutched Friars and Cooper's Row. At its eastern end, the street is a turn off Minories. It is home to America Square, the City of London Medical Centre, and a number of bar-restaurants and offices.

Crosswall was named as it crossed the old Roman wall, which was discovered after the bombing of 1940. Previously the street had been named John Street, after King John.

The nearest mainline railway station is Fenchurch Street, and the nearest London Underground station is Tower Hill.
