= Pepys Street =

Street in the City of London

Coordinates: 51.510739°N 0.077984°W

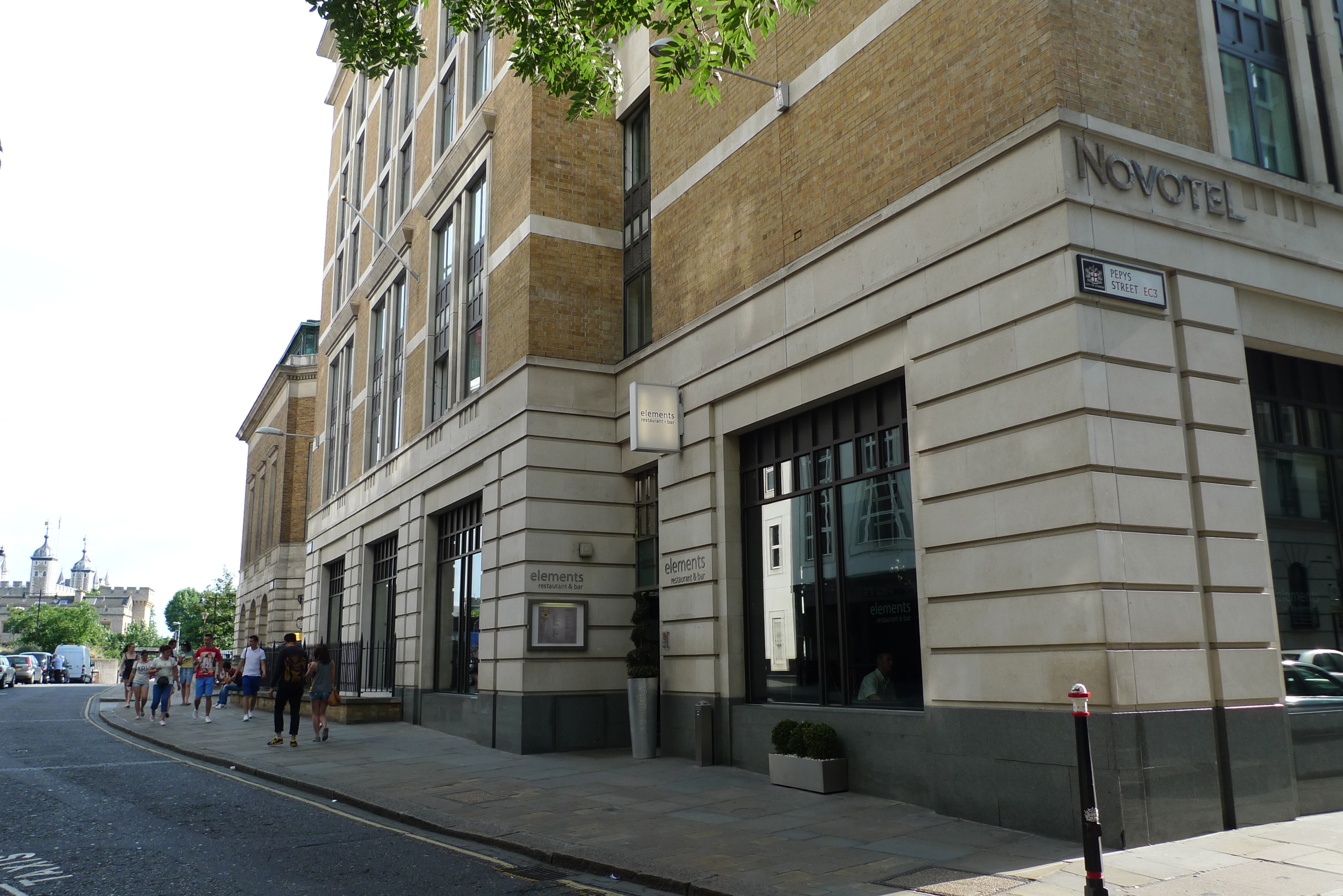
A bar on the corner of Pepys Street

Pepys Street is a street in the City of London, linking Seething Lane in the west to Cooper's Row in the east. Savage Gardens crosses the street.

When the Port of London Authority Building was erected in 1923, Colchester Street was extended to Seething Lane and renamed after the diarist Samuel Pepys, who lived there during the Great Fire of London.

The modern Pepys Street is home to hotels and offices.

The nearest London Underground station is Tower Hill and the nearest Docklands Light Railway station is Tower Gateway. The mainline railway terminus Fenchurch Street is also close by.

== See also ==
- List of eponymous roads in London
