= America Square =

Street and square in the City of London

Coordinates: 51.511294°N 0.075641°W

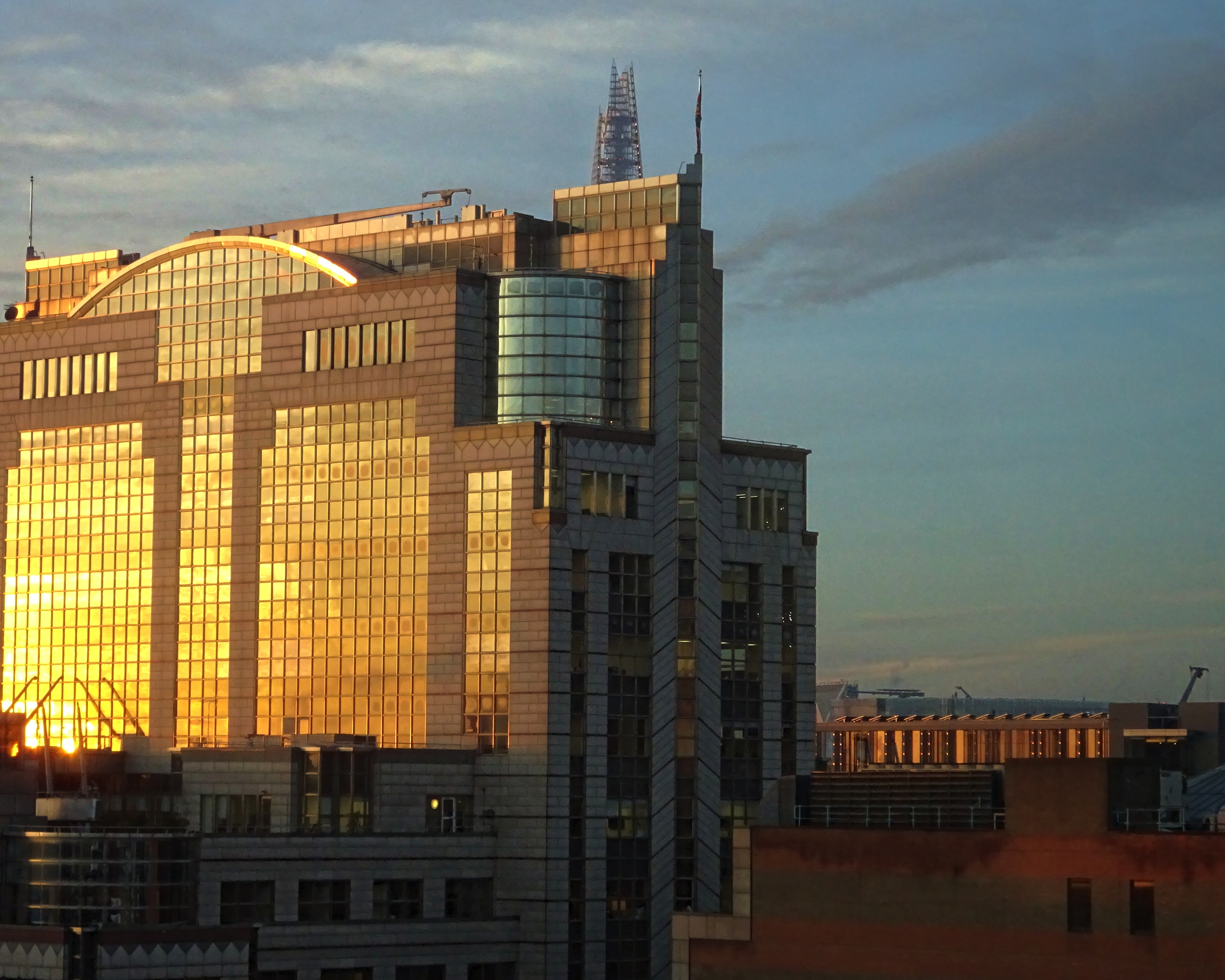
One America Square

America Square is a street and small square in London, off Crosswall and located near Minories. The square was built in about 1760 and dedicated to the American colonies.

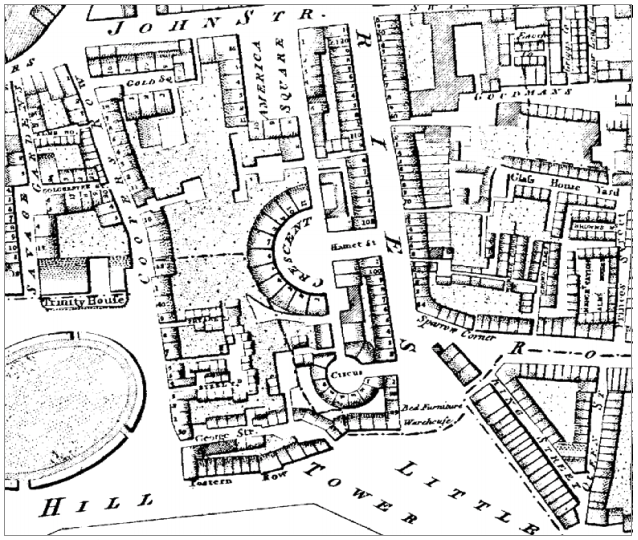
Detail of Richard Horwood's map showing George Dance the Younger's "Square, Crescent and Circus"

America Square was developed as part of Square, Crescent and Circus under plans by George Dance the Younger in 1768–1774. The Crescent was built at the expense of Sir Benjamin Hammet, who is commemorated by the name of another street in the area. He was a partner in the City bank of William Esdaile and was also alderman for the ward of Portsoken.

Nathan Meyer Rothschild lived at No. 14 in the 19th century. The square was bombed in 1941, and Rothschild's house was demolished.

Today, America Square is occupied by offices, restaurants and a gymnasium. The nearest London Underground stations are Tower Hill (to the south) and Aldgate (to the north), and the nearest Docklands Light Railway station is Tower Gateway, on Minories. Also nearby is Fenchurch Street station, a mainline railway terminus with services towards east London and south Essex.
