= Savage Gardens =

Minor street in the City of London, England

Coordinates: 51.511141°N 0.077795°W

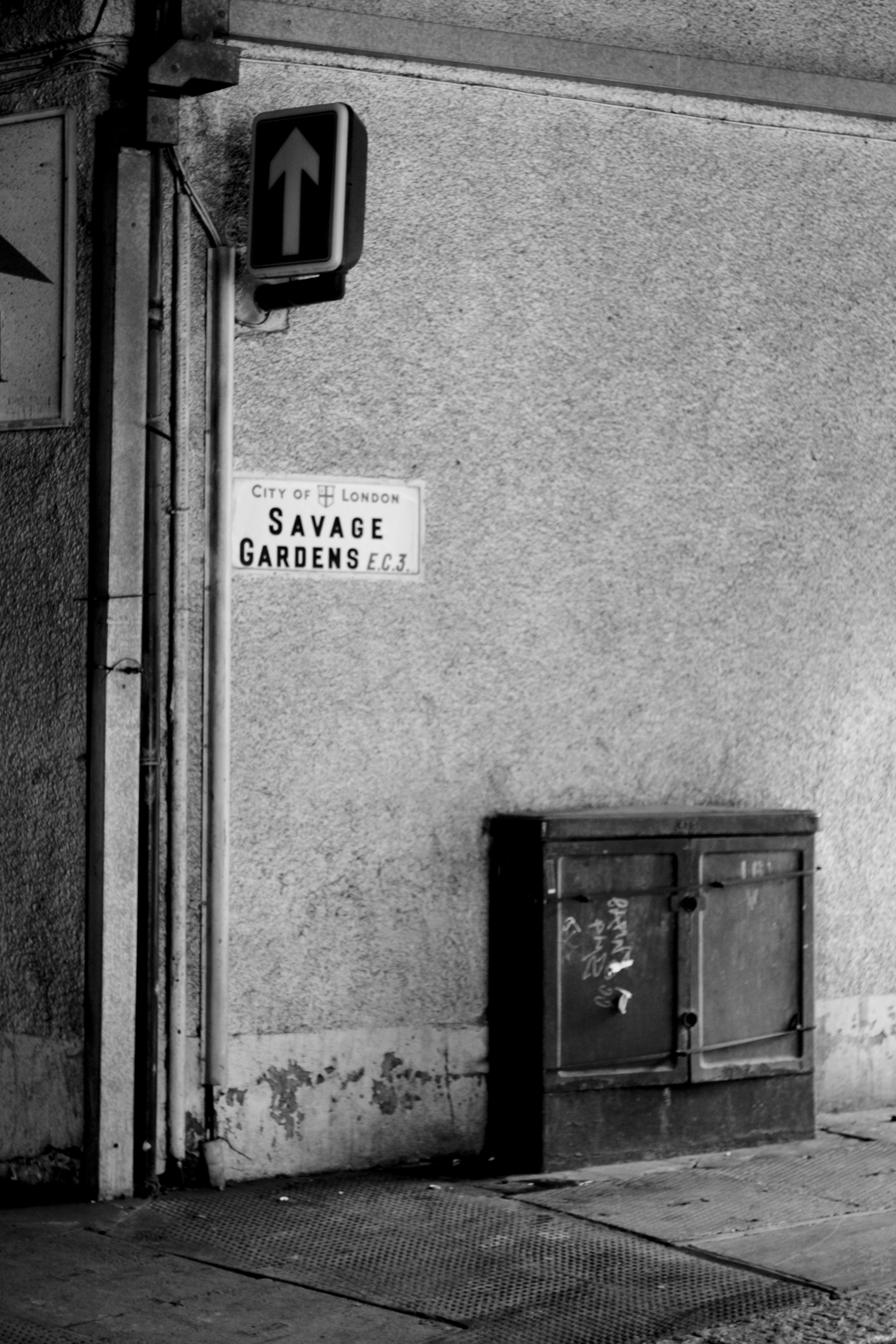
The northern corner of Savage Gardens

Savage Gardens is a minor street in the City of London, connecting Crutched Friars in the north to Trinity Square in the south, crossing Pepys Street. It was part-pedestrianised in 2011, with the carriageway remaining between Pepys Street and Trinity Square.

The house of Sir Thomas Savage was here in the 17th century, after whom the street is named.

There is a DoubleTree Hilton hotel which adjoins the street, with a rooftop bar. To the south of the street, the western side of the Headquarters of Trinity House faces the street.

== Transport ==
The nearest London Underground station is Tower Hill. A mainline terminus is also close by at Fenchurch Street, as is a Docklands Light Railway station at Tower Gateway.
