= St Magnus the Martyr =

Coordinates: 51°30′33.41″N 0°5′10.81″W

- Ward Church of Saint Magnus the Martyr, London Bridge
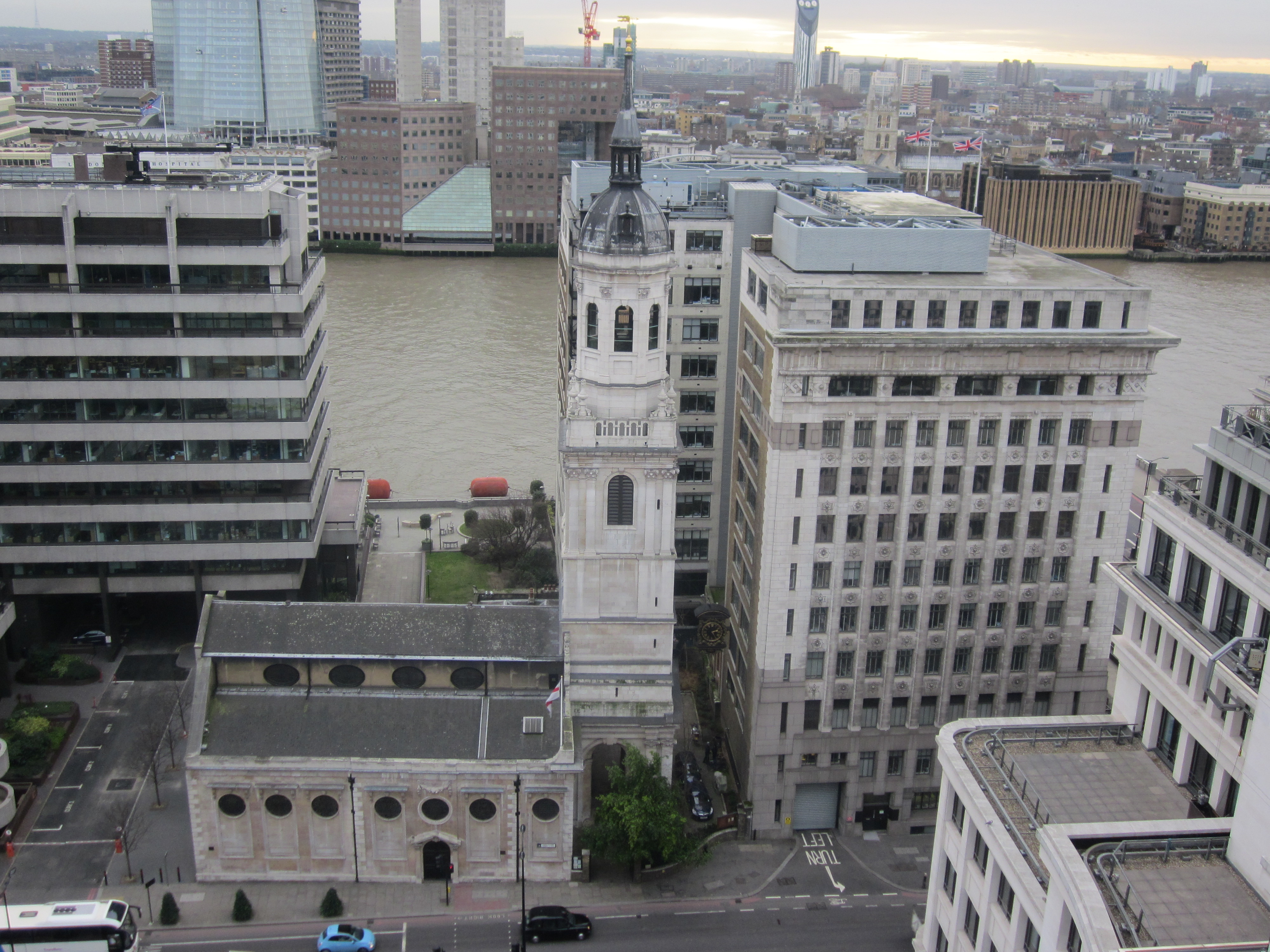
- St Magnus the Martyr

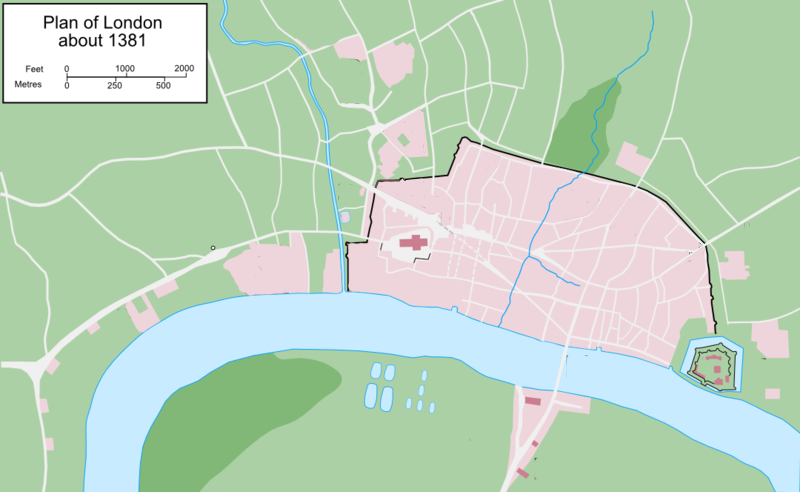
- Location within City of London Location within City of London in 1300
- OS grid reference: TQ 32910 80671
- Location: Lower Thames Street, City of London, EC2
- Country: England
- Denomination: Church of England
- Previous denomination: Roman Catholic (to 1538)
- Churchmanship: Traditional Catholic
- Website: stmagnusmartyr.org.uk

History
- Founded: 11th century
- Dedication: Either Magnus Erlendsson, Earl of Orkney or Magnus of Trani

Architecture
- Heritage designation: Grade I listed building
- Architect: Christopher Wren
- Style: English Baroque

Administration
- Diocese: London

Clergy
- Bishop: Rt Revd Jonathan Baker (PEV)
- Rector: Philip Warner

St Magnus the Martyr, London Bridge, is a Church of England church and parish within the City of London. The church, is on the south side of Lower Thames Street near The Monument (to the Great Fire of London), and is part of the Diocese of London and under the pastoral care of the Bishop of Fulham. It is a Grade I listed building. The rector uses the title "Cardinal Rector" and, since the abolition of the College of Minor Canons of St Paul's Cathedral in 2016, is the only cleric in the Church of England to use the title cardinal.

Saint Magnus' church lies on the original alignment of London Bridge between the City and Southwark, for centuries the only bridge between the sea and Kingston. This ancient parish was united with that of St Margaret, New Fish Street, in 1670 and with that of St Michael, Crooked Lane, in 1831. The three united parishes retained separate vestries and churchwardens. Parish clerks continue to be appointed for each of the three parishes.

St Magnus is the guild church of the Worshipful Company of Fishmongers and the Worshipful Company of Plumbers, and the ward church of Bridge and Bridge Without. It is also twinned with the Church of the Resurrection in New York City.

== Dedication ==
The identity of the St Magnus to whom the church is dedicated is disputed. It is now dedicated to St Magnus Erlendsson, Earl of Orkney, who died in 1116 or 1117. However, scholarly opinion is increasingly coming to the conclusion that the original dedication was to St Magnus of Anagni, a 2nd-century Italian saint whose cult was widespread.

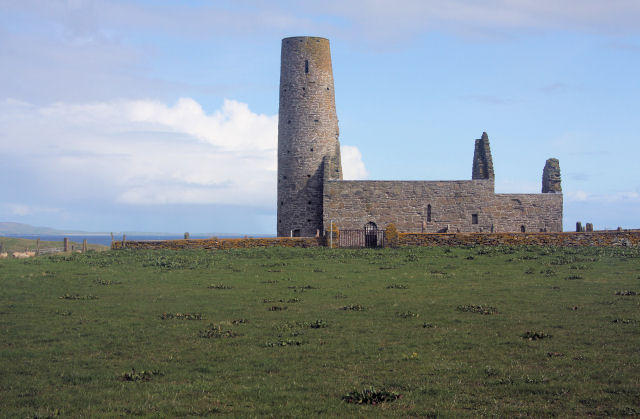
St Magnus Kirk, Egilsay

St Magnus of Orkney was executed on the island of Egilsay on 16 April in 1116 or 1117 (the year is uncertain), having been captured during a power struggle with his cousin, a political rival. Magnus had a reputation for piety and gentleness and was sanctified (a form of unofficial canonisation) in 1136. St Ronald, the son of Magnus's sister Gunhild Erlendsdotter, became Earl of Orkney in 1136 and in 1137 initiated the construction of St Magnus Cathedral in Kirkwall.

St Magnus of Orkney

The London church was not linked to St Magnus of Orkney before the 18th century, when it was suggested that it was either "dedicated to the memory of St Magnus or Magnes, who suffer'd under the Emperor Aurelian in 276 [this appears to be a reference to St Mammes of Caesarea, whose feast day is on 17 August], or else to a person of that name, who was the famous Apostle or Bishop of the Orcades."

For the next century most historians followed the suggestion that the church was dedicated to the Roman saint of Cæsarea. However, in the mid-19th century the prominent Danish archaeologist Professor Jens Jacob Asmussen Worsaae (1821–85) instead promoted the association with Magnus of Orkney, during his visit to the British Isles in 1846–47, when he was formulating the concept of the "Viking Age", and then in his Account of the Danes and Norwegians in England, Scotland, and Ireland of 1852. This theory immediately found its way into both guides and academic works. The discovery of Magnus of Orkney's relics in 1919 increased interest in a Scandinavian patron and this connection was encouraged by the rector who arrived in 1921. The dedication to St Magnus of Orkney was confirmed by the Bishop of London in 1926. Following this decision a patronal festival service was held on 16 April 1926. The 900th anniversary of the death of St Magnus was marked with a Pontifical High Mass and Solemn Pontifical Vespers at the London church on 16 April 2016 (although it was to be celebrated in 2017 at St Magnus Cathedral in Orkney).

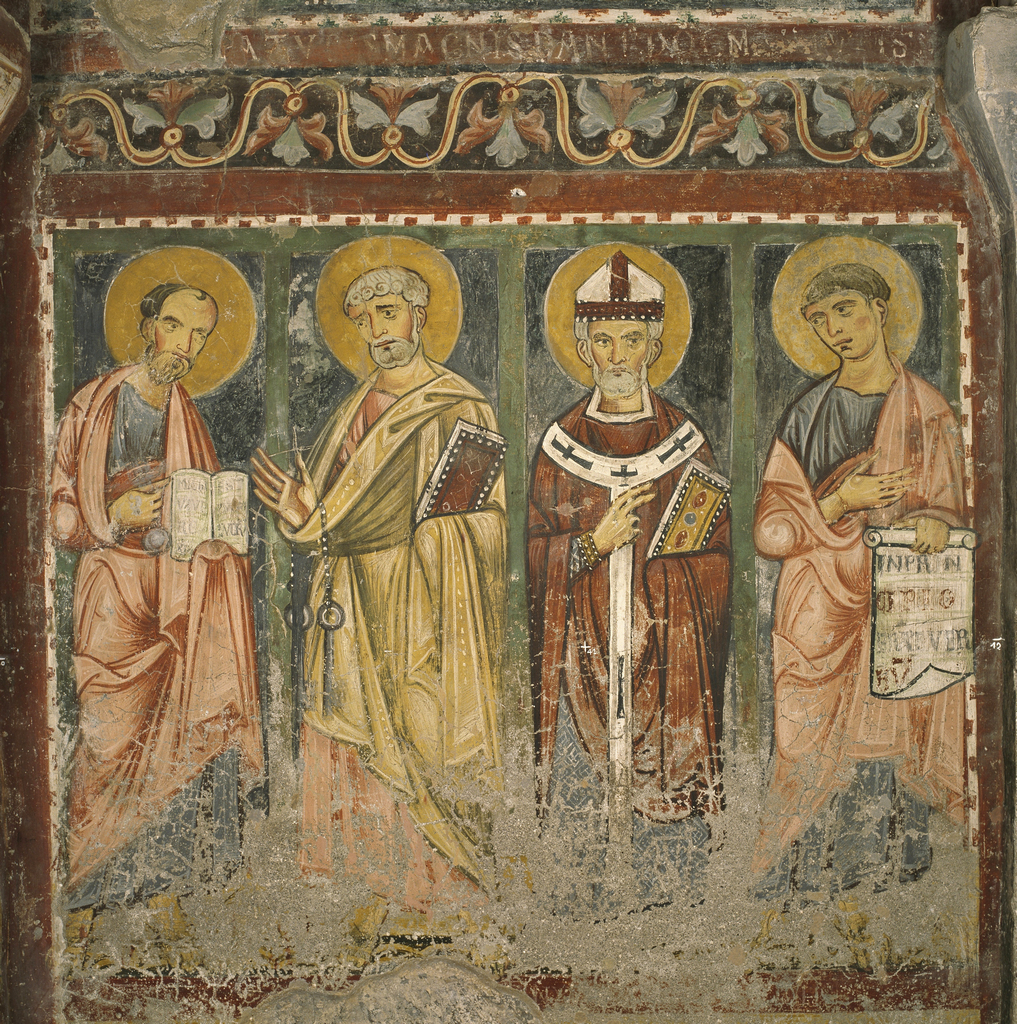
St Magnus of Anagni

The principal argument against an association with Magnus of Orkney is that the original church pre-dated his sanctification by around a century, and was also probably constructed before the cult of St Olaf, which did not become established in London until the 1050s. The dedication of the church to St Magnus (as for the four City churches dedicated to St Botolph) at least partly reflected interest in particular saints' relics during the 11th century. There was a cult of this earlier (unidentified) St Magnus before the Norman Conquest: several English monastic houses claimed to have relics of the saint; King Edgar gave one to Westminster Abbey; and the relic collection of Peterborough Abbey included the hand of St Magnus the Martyr. The feast of St Magnus the Martyr, celebrated on 19 August, appears in most liturgical calendars from the Gelasian Sacramentary in the eighth century and the missal of Robert of Jumièges in the 11th century to the 16th century.

It is therefore likely that the original dedication of the church was to St Magnus of Anagni, a putative second-century bishop, martyred in the reign of the Emperor Decius, whose feast was celebrated on 19 August. This identification was proposed by Richard Thomson in his Chronicles of London Bridge of 1827, and has more recently been argued at greater length by Matthew Payne and Michael Cooper. It is possible that the dedication was influenced by Cnut's journey to Rome in 1027 or by the translation to Canterbury in 1023 of the remains of Alphage, Bishop and Martyr, from St Paul's Cathedral, where a cult had rapidly developed at his tomb.

The feast on 19 August was still celebrated in the 16th century. It was included in an "Almanack" attached to Miles Coverdale's translation of the Bible and in the Preces Privitae of 1564 (authorised by Elizabeth I for private devotion), but was excluded from the Book of Common Prayer. It was also omitted from the Tridentine calendar, falling as it did within the Octave of the Assumption, but has remained in local calendars. St Magnus of Anagni also remains in the Martyrologium Romanum.

== History ==
=== 11th and 12th centuries: foundation ===
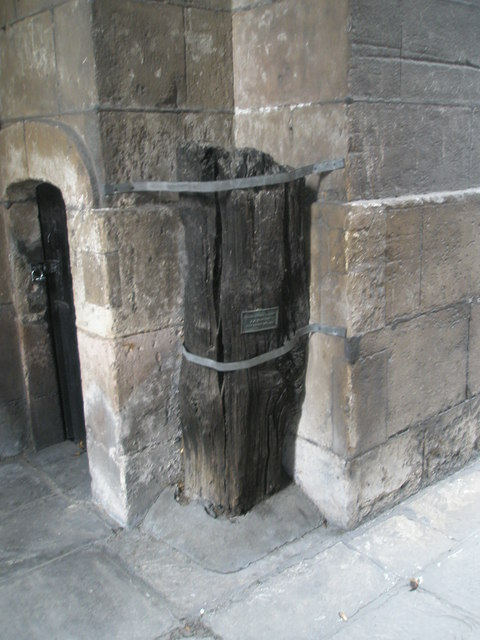
Piling from the Roman river wall dating to about AD 75

A metropolitan bishop of London attended the Council of Arles in 314, which indicates that there must have been a Christian community in Londinium by this date, and it has been suggested that a large aisled building excavated in 1993 near Tower Hill can be compared with the 4th-century Cathedral of St Tecla in Milan. However, there is no evidence to suggest that any of the mediaeval churches in the City of London had a Roman foundation.

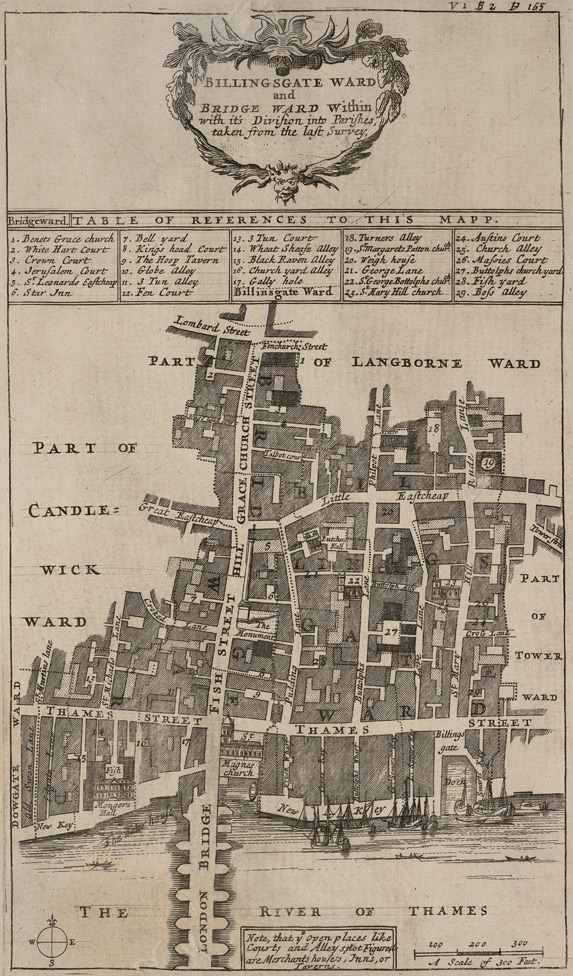
Parish and ward map

The archaeological record suggests that the area of the bridgehead was not occupied from the early 5th century until the early 10th century. Environmental evidence indicates that the area was waste ground during this period, colonised by elder and nettles. Following Alfred the Great's decision to reoccupy the walled area of London in 886, new harbours were established at Queenhithe and Billingsgate. A wooden bridge was in place by the early 11th century, a factor which would have encouraged the occupation of the bridgehead by craftsmen and traders. During the 10th and 11th centuries, as overseas trade revived, the landing places immediately downstream of the bridge became ever more significant. Streets were laid out in the vicinity of the bridge leading from the river into the eastern part of the City. Fish Street Hill, leading from the bridge itself to Bishopsgate, originated earlier.

The narrow strip of land south of the Roman river wall widened enough to accommodate a significant number of buildings and a collapse of part of the wall, probably at some point between 1016 and 1066, helped to facilitate access. The waterfront at this time was a hive of activity, with the construction of embankments sloping down from the riverside wall to the river. A lane connecting Botolph's Wharf and Billingsgate to the rebuilt bridge had developed by the mid-11th century. Thames Street appeared in the second half of the 11th century immediately behind (north of) the old Roman riverside wall and in 1931 a piling from this was discovered during the excavation of the foundations of a nearby building. It now stands at the base of the church tower. St Magnus was built to the south of Thames Street to serve the growing population of the bridgehead area in the 11th century.

The small ancient parish extended about 110 yards along the waterfront either side of the old bridge, from 'Stepheneslane' (later Churchehawlane or Church Yard Alley) and 'Oystergate' (later called Water Lane or Gully Hole) on the West side to 'Retheresgate' (a southern extension of Pudding Lane) on the East side, and was centred on the crossroads formed by Fish Street Hill (originally Bridge Street, then New Fish Street) and Thames Street. The mediaeval parish also included Drinkwater's Wharf (named after the owner, Thomas Drinkwater), which was located immediately West of the bridge, and Fish Wharf, which was to the south of the church. The latter was of considerable importance as the fishmongers had their shops on the wharf. The tenement was devised by Andrew Hunte to the Rector and Churchwardens in 1446. The ancient parish was situated in the South East part of Bridge Ward, which had evolved in the first half of the 11th century between the embankments to either side of the bridge.

St Magnus was purportedly granted by William I in 1067 to Westminster Abbey. Although this charter is generally accepted to be a later forgery by Osbert of Clare, Prior of Westminster Abbey, as is a charter of confirmation in 1108–16, it may preserve genuine evidence of a foundation of the church in the 11th century. There is a further document referring to the church in 1128–33. In the second half of the 12th century control of the advowson of St Magnus was disputed between the Abbot of Westminster and the Prior of Bermondsey. The case was resolved in the Curia Regis on 23 April 1182, with the advowson being divided equally between them. Later in the 1180s, on their joint presentation, the Archdeacon of London inducted his nephew as parson. On 14 April 1208, again on the joint presentation of the Abbot of Westminster and the Prior of Bermondsey, the Bishop of London instituted Simon de Valenciis to St Magnus.

=== 13th and 14th centuries: stone bridge and chapel of St Thomas Becket ===
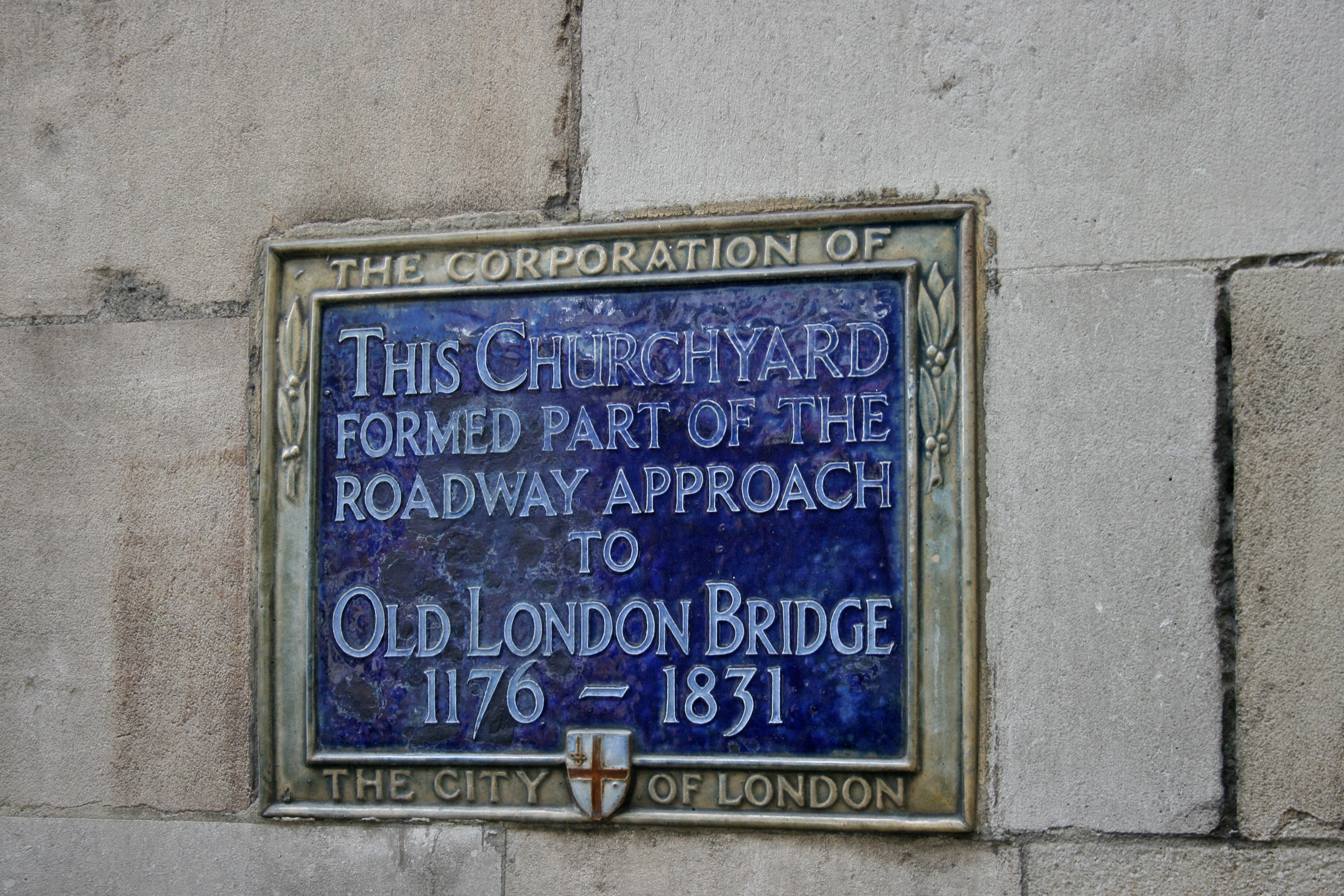
Approach to Old London Bridge

Between the late Saxon period and 1209 there was a series of wooden bridges across the Thames, but in that year a stone bridge was completed. The work was overseen by Peter of Colechurch, a priest and head of the Fraternity of the Brethren of London Bridge. The Church had from early times encouraged the building of bridges and this activity was so important it was perceived to be an act of piety – a commitment to God which should be supported by the giving of alms. London's citizens made gifts of land and money "to God and the Bridge". The Bridge House Estates became part of the City's jurisdiction in 1282.

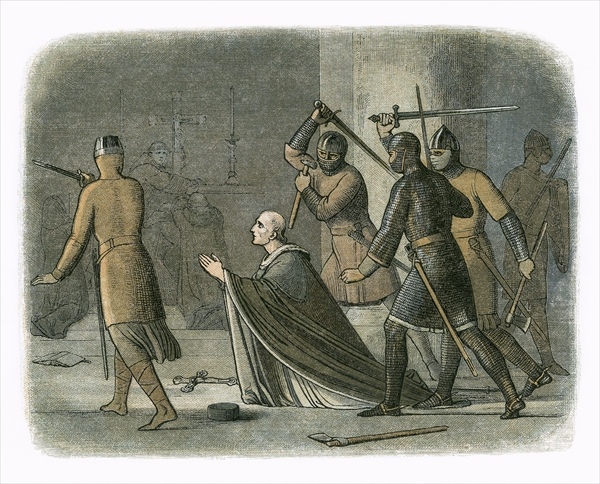
Martyrdom of St Thomas Becket in Canterbury Cathedral

Until 1831 the bridge was aligned with Fish Street Hill, so the main entrance into the City from the south passed the West door of St Magnus on the north bank of the river. The bridge included a chapel dedicated to St Thomas Becket for the use of pilgrims journeying to Canterbury Cathedral to visit his tomb. The chapel and about two thirds of the bridge were in the parish of St Magnus. After some years of rivalry a dispute arose between the church and the chapel over the offerings given to the chapel by the pilgrims. The matter was resolved by the brethren of the chapel making an annual contribution to St Magnus. At the Reformation the chapel was turned into a house and later a warehouse, the latter being demolished in 1757–58.

The church grew in importance. On 21 November 1234 a grant of land was made to the parson of St Magnus for the enlargement of the church. The London Eyre of 1244 recorded that in 1238 "A thief named William of Ewelme of the county of Buckingham fled to the church of St. Magnus the Martyr, London, and there acknowledged the theft and abjured the realm. He had no chattels." Another entry recorded that "The City answers saying that the church of ... St. Magnus the Martyr ... which [is] situated on the king's highway ... ought to belong to the king and be in his gift". The church presumably jutted into the road running to the bridge, as it did in later times. In 1276 it was recorded that "the church of St. Magnus the Martyr is worth £15 yearly and Master Geoffrey de la Wade now holds it by the grant of the prior of Bermundeseie and the abbot of Westminster to whom King Henry conferred the advowson by his charter."

London churches c. 1300

In 1274 "came King Edward and his wife [Eleanor] from the Holy Land and were crowned at Westminster on the Sunday next after the Feast of the Assumption of Our Lady [15 August], being the Feast of Saint Magnus [19 August]; and the Conduit in Chepe ran all the day with red wine and white wine to drink, for all such as wished." Edward I's eldest son, Alphonso, Earl of Chester, died at Windsor on the feast of St Magnus, 19 August 1284. Stow records that "in the year 1293, for victory obtained by Edward I against the Scots, every citizen, according to their several trade, made their several show, but especially the fishmongers" whose solemn procession including a knight "representing St Magnus, because it was upon St Magnus' day".

Alderman Hugh Pourt, fishmonger and Sheriff of London, and his wife Margaret founded a perpetual chantry at the start of the 14th century. An important religious guild, the Confraternity de Salve Regina, was in existence by 1343, having been founded by the "better sort of the Parish of St Magnus" to sing the anthem 'Salve Regina' every evening. The Guild certificates of 1388/89 (12 Richard II) record that the Confraternity of Salve Regina and the guild of St Thomas the Martyr in the chapel on the bridge, whose members belonged to St Magnus parish, had determined to become one, to have the anthem of St Thomas after the Salve Regina and to devote their united resources to restoring and enlarging the church of St Magnus. An act of Parliament of 1437, the Guilds and Fraternities Act 1436 (15 Hen. 6. c. 6), provided that all incorporated fraternities and companies should register their charters and have their ordinances approved by the civic authorities. Fear of enquiry into their privileges may have led established fraternities to seek a firm foundation for their rights. The letters patent of the fraternity of St Mary and St Thomas the Martyr of Salve Regina in St Magnus dated 26 May 1448 mention that the fraternity had petitioned for a charter on the grounds that the society was not duly founded.

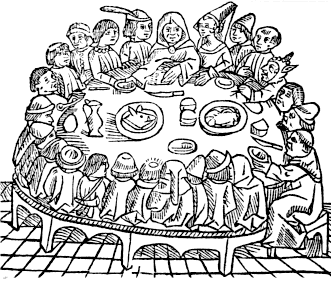
The pilgrims of the Canterbury Tales by Geoffrey Chaucer

In the mid-14th century the Pope was the Patron of the living and appointed five rectors to the benefice.

Henry Yevele, the master mason whose work included the rebuilding of Westminster Hall, the naves of Westminster Abbey and Canterbury Cathedral and the tomb of John of Gaunt and his first wife Blanche of Lancaster in old St Paul's, was a parishioner and rebuilt the chapel on London Bridge between 1384 and 1397. He served as a warden of London Bridge and was buried at St Magnus on his death in 1400. His monument was extant in John Stow's time, but was probably destroyed by the fire of 1666.

Yevele, as the King's Mason, was overseen by Geoffrey Chaucer in his capacity as the Clerk of the King's Works. In The General Prologue of Chaucer's The Canterbury Tales the five guildsmen "were clothed alle in o lyveree of a solempne and a greet fraternitee" and may be thought of as belonging to the guild in the parish of St Magnus, or one like it. Chaucer's family home was near to the bridge in Thames Street. St Magnus appears several times in Anya Seton's historical novel Katherine, which is set in the 14th century.

=== 15th and 16th centuries: before and after the Reformation ===
In 1417 a dispute arose concerning who should take the place of honour amongst the rectors in the City churches at the Whit Monday procession, a place that had been claimed from time to time by the rectors of St Peter Cornhill, St Magnus the Martyr and St Nicholas Cole Abbey. The Mayor and Aldermen decided that the Rector of St Peter Cornhill should take precedence.

In 1413 John Hert, grocer, bequeathed £40 to the parish to build a new south aisle. Two adjoining plots of land laying to the south of the nave were donated to the church, one by Henry Yevele in 1400, and the other by John Hale, Goldsmith, in 1426. This site was quickly developed into a cloister, used primarily as a graveyard, but undoubtedly with additional symbolic and processional purposes. For example, Henry Crane, citizen and fletcher, requested burial in the cloister of St Magnus Martyr and left 3s 4d to the parish clerks' brotherhood to pray for his soul in his will of 18 July, proved 4 August 1486.

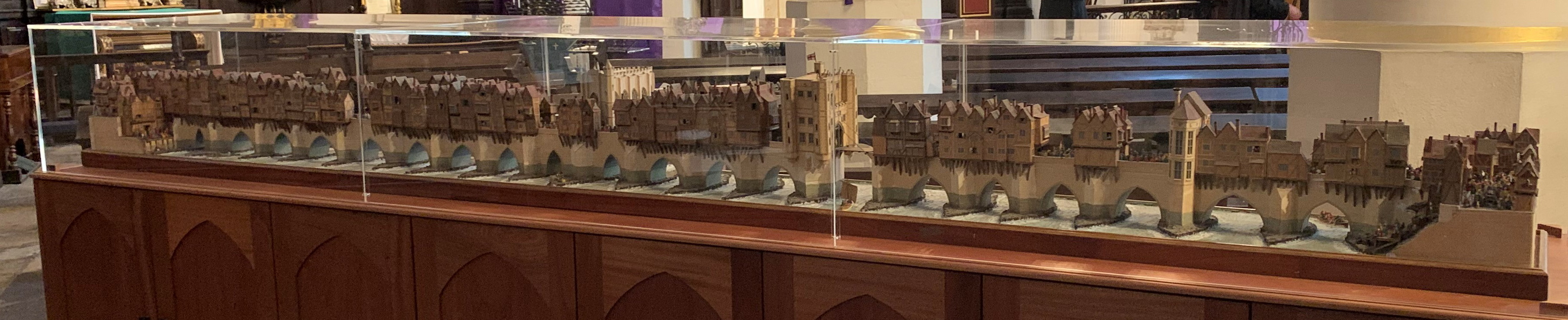
Model of old London Bridge c1400

St Magnus Corner at the north end of London Bridge was an important meeting place in mediaeval London, where notices were exhibited, proclamations read out and wrongdoers punished. As it was conveniently close to the River Thames, the church was chosen by the Bishop between the 15th and 17th centuries as a convenient venue for general meetings of the clergy in his diocese.

St Magnus maintained a group of singing children from the 1470s until the 1550s. In pictures from the mid-16th century the old church looks very similar to the present-day St Giles without Cripplegate in the Barbican. The London and Middlesex Chantry Certificate of 1548 listed the value of chantries attached to the church and the Fraternity of Salve Regina, the annual income of the latter being £49 16s 8d. The wardens said that church lands had been used for the past 200 years to maintain the church. A sum of £9 p.a. was paid to Robert Saye, priest. By the 1550s Saye was a Vicar Choral at St Paul's Cathedral and he probably moved from St Magnus when the chantry there was closed.

Dr John Young, Bishop of Callipolis (rector of St Magnus 1514–15) pronounced judgement on 16 December 1514 (with the Bishop of London and in the presence of Thomas More, then under-sheriff of London) in the heresy case concerning Richard Hunne. In the summer of 1527, Thomas Bilney preached a sermon at St Magnus criticising its newly-erected rood, awaiting gilding, as idolatrous. He was tried for heresy in December 1527 but recanted and was released. However, there was a co-ordinated campaign to discredit him, and he was tried again in 1531 after a relapse into heresy and was burned at the stake in Norwich on 19 August (St Magnus Day) 1531. A plaque erected in 1931 to mark the 400th anniversary of his death calls him the "spiritual father of the Reformation in England".

Maurice Griffith was rector here from 1537 until his death in 1558, holding the Bishopric of Rochester as well from 1554. His funeral, held at St Magnus, was a splendid affair, with chief mourners Sir William Petre, Sir William Garrard and Simon Lowe. These last two were parishioners. Sir William Garrard, Master of the Haberdashers' Company, Alderman, Sheriff of London in 1553/53, Lord Mayor in 1555/56 and a Member of Parliament was born in the parish and buried at St Magnus in 1571.Simon Lowe was a Member of Parliament and Master of the Merchant Taylors' Company during the reign of Queen Mary and one of the jurors who acquitted Sir Nicholas Throckmorton in 1554.

The patronage of St Magnus, having previously been in the Abbots and Convents of Westminster and Bermondsey (who presented alternately), fell to the Crown on the suppression of the monasteries. In 1553, Queen Mary, by letters patent, granted it to the Bishop of London and his successors. According to the martyrologist John Foxe, a woman was imprisoned in the 'cage' on London Bridge in April 1555 and told to "cool herself there" for refusing to pray at St Magnus for the recently deceased Pope Julius III.

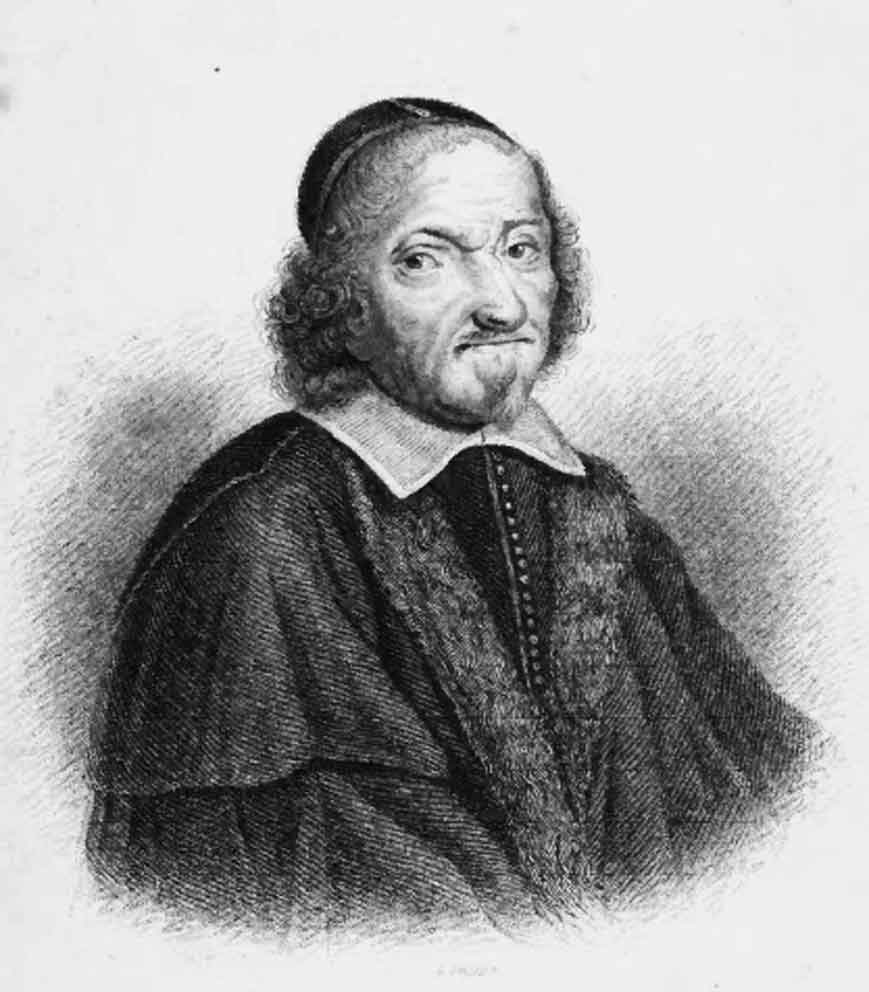
Myles Coverdale

John Rylie, citizen and haberdasher, bequeathed his dwelling house at the north end of London Bridge to charity in 1577. Sir William Romney, merchant, philanthropist, Master of the Haberdashers' Company, Alderman for Bridge Within and Sheriff of London in 1603/04 was married at St Magnus in 1582. Ben Jonson is believed to have been married at St Magnus in 1594.

The church had a series of distinguished rectors in the second half of the 16th and first half of the 17th century, including Myles Coverdale (Rector 1564–66), John Young (Rector 1566–92), Theophilus Aylmer (Rector 1592–1625), (Archdeacon of London and son of John Aylmer), and Cornelius Burges (Rector 1626–41). Coverdale was buried in the chancel of St Bartholomew-by-the-Exchange, but when that church was pulled down in 1840 his remains were removed to St Magnus.

St Magnus's rood, along with "several other things of superstition belonging to that church", were destroyed on 16 September 1559 in "an ebullition of Protestant zeal" On 5 November 1562 the churchwardens were ordered to break, or cause to be broken, in two parts all the altar stones in the church. Coverdale, an anti-vestiarian, was Rector at the peak of the vestments controversy. In March 1566 Archbishop Parker caused great consternation among many clergy by his edicts prescribing what was to be worn and by his summoning the London clergy to Lambeth to require their compliance. Coverdale excused himself from attending. Stow records that a non-conforming Scot who normally preached at St Magnus twice a day precipitated a fight on Palm Sunday 1566 at Little All Hallows in Thames Street with his preaching against vestments. Coverdale's resignation from St Magnus in summer 1566 may have been associated with these events. Separatist congregations started to emerge after 1566 and the first such, who called themselves 'Puritans' or 'Unspottyd Lambs of the Lord', was discovered close to St Magnus at Plumbers' Hall in Thames Street on 19 June 1567.

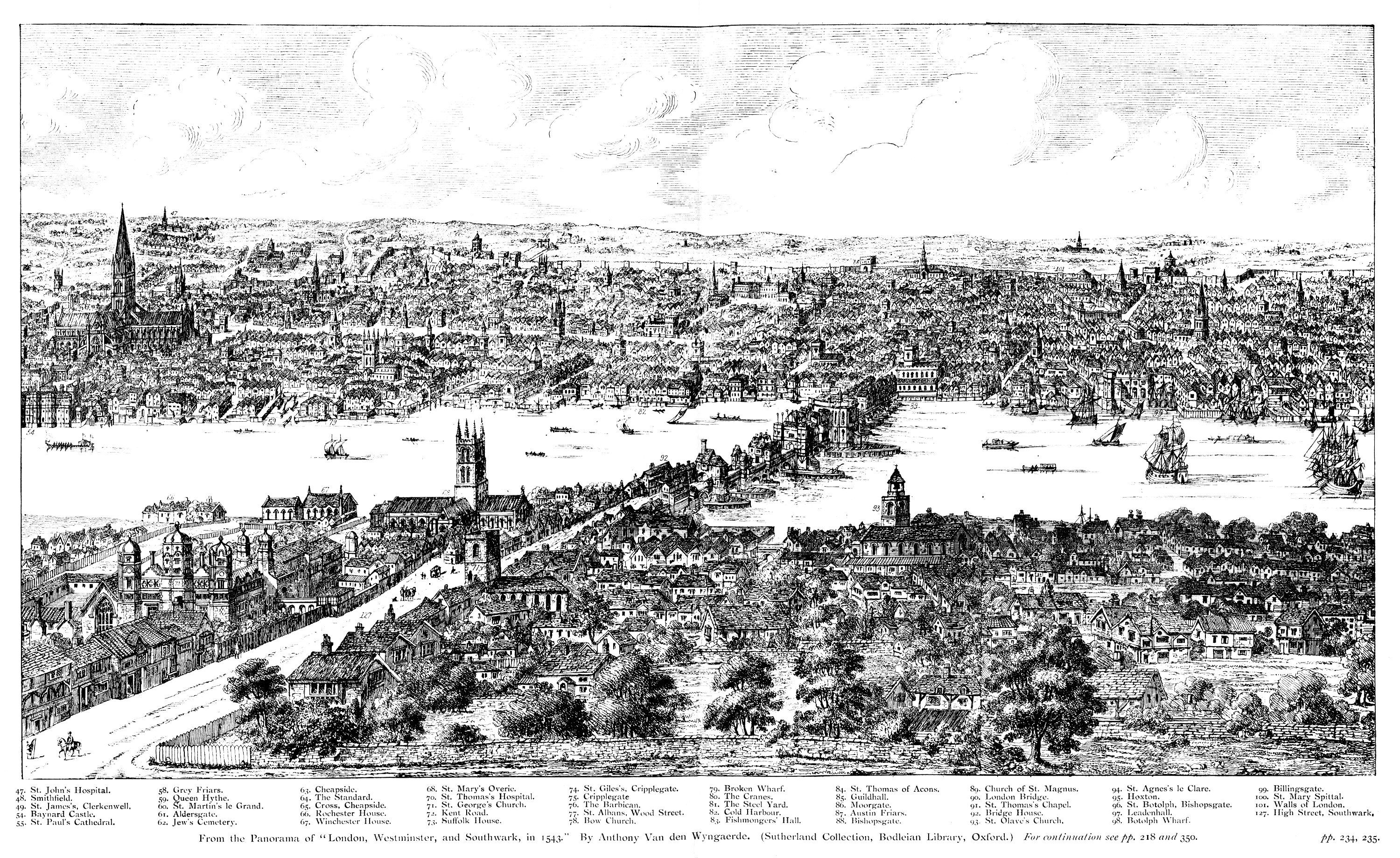
Old London Bridge in 1543

=== 17th century: Civil War, Commonwealth and Restoration ===
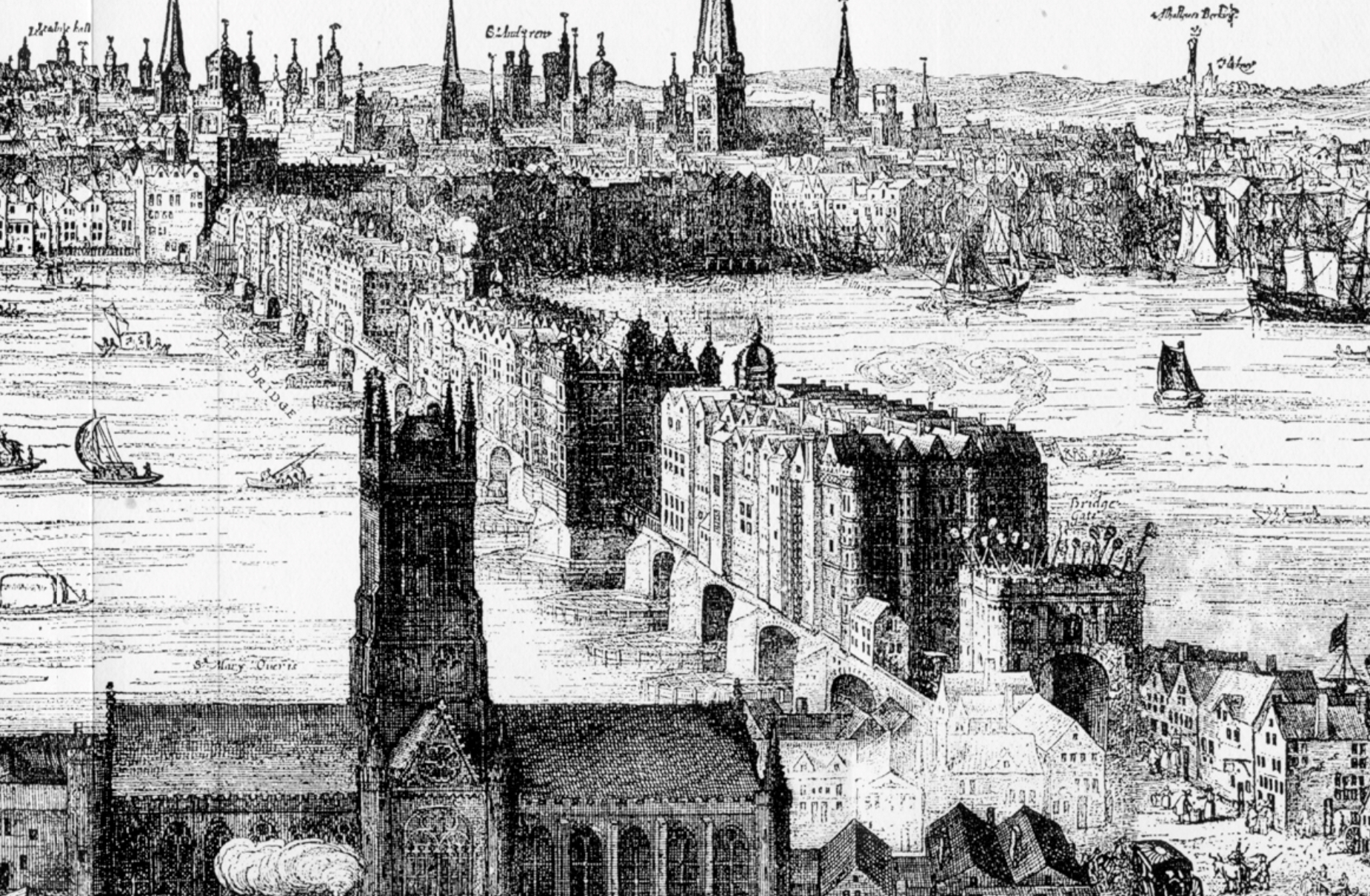
Old London Bridge in 1616. The spiked heads of executed criminals can be seen above the Southwark gatehouse.

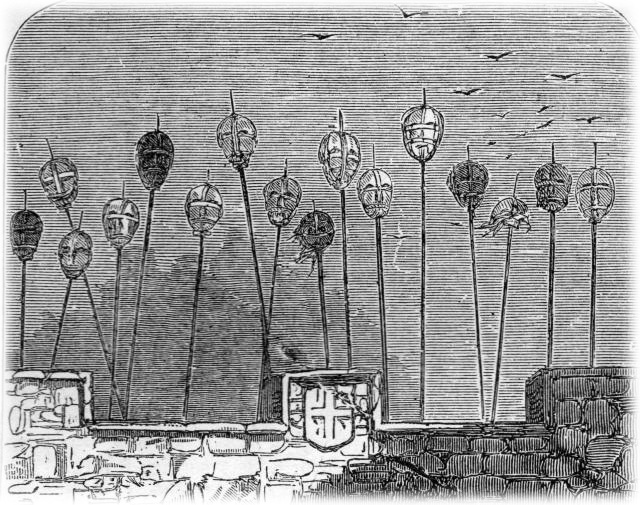
Heads of traitors, including Catholic priests, on Old London Bridge

St Magnus narrowly escaped destruction in 1633. A later edition of Stow's Survey records that "On the 13th day of February, between eleven and twelve at night, there happened in the house of one Briggs, a Needle-maker near St Magnus Church, at the North end of the Bridge, by the carelessness of a Maid-Servant setting a tub of hot sea-coal ashes under a pair of stairs, a sad and lamentable fire, which consumed all the buildings before eight of the clock the next morning, from the North end of the Bridge to the first vacancy on both sides, containing forty-two houses; water then being very scarce, the Thames being almost frozen over." Susannah Chambers "by her last will & testament bearing date 28th December 1640 gave the sum of Twenty-two shillings and Sixpence Yearly for a Sermon to be preached on the 12th day of February in every Year within the Church of Saint Magnus in commemoration of God's merciful preservation of the said Church of Saint Magnus from Ruin, by the late and terrible Fire on London Bridge. Likewise Annually to the Poor the sum of 17/6." The tradition of a "Fire Sermon" was revived on 12 February 2004, when the first preacher was the Rt Revd and Rt Hon Richard Chartres, Bishop of London.

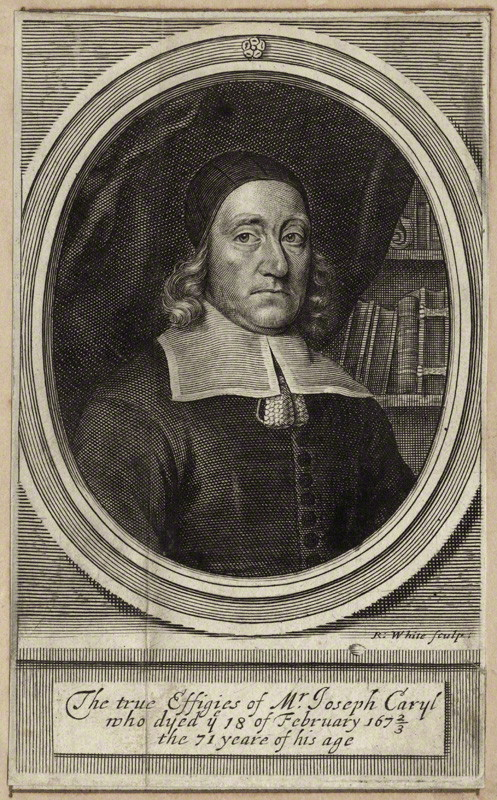
Joseph Caryl

Parliamentarian rule and the more Protestant ethos of the 1640s led to the removal or destruction of "superstitious" and "idolatrous" images and fittings. Glass painters such as Baptista Sutton, who had previously installed "Laudian innovations", found new employment by repairing and replacing these to meet increasingly strict Protestant standards. In January 1642 Sutton replaced 93 feet of glass at St Magnus and in June 1644 he was called back to take down the "painted imagery glass" and replace it. In June 1641 "rail riots" broke out at a number of churches. This was a time of high tension following the trial and execution of the Earl of Strafford and rumours of army and popish plots were rife. The Protestation Oath, with its pledge to defend the true religion "against all Popery and popish innovation", triggered demands from parishioners for the removal of the rails as popish innovations which the Protestation had bound them to reform. The minister arranged a meeting between those for and against the pulling down of the rails, but was unsuccessful in reaching a compromise and it was feared that they would be demolished by force. However, in 1663 the parish resumed Laudian practice and re-erected rails around its communion table.

Joseph Caryl was incumbent from 1645 until his ejection in 1662. In 1663 he was reportedly living near London Bridge and preaching to an Independent congregation that met at various places in the City.

During the Great Plague of 1665, the City authorities ordered fires to be kept burning night and day, in the hope that the air would be cleansed. Daniel Defoe's semi-fictional, but highly realistic, work A Journal of the Plague Year records that one of these was "just by St Magnus Church".

=== Great Fire of London and rebuilding of the church ===
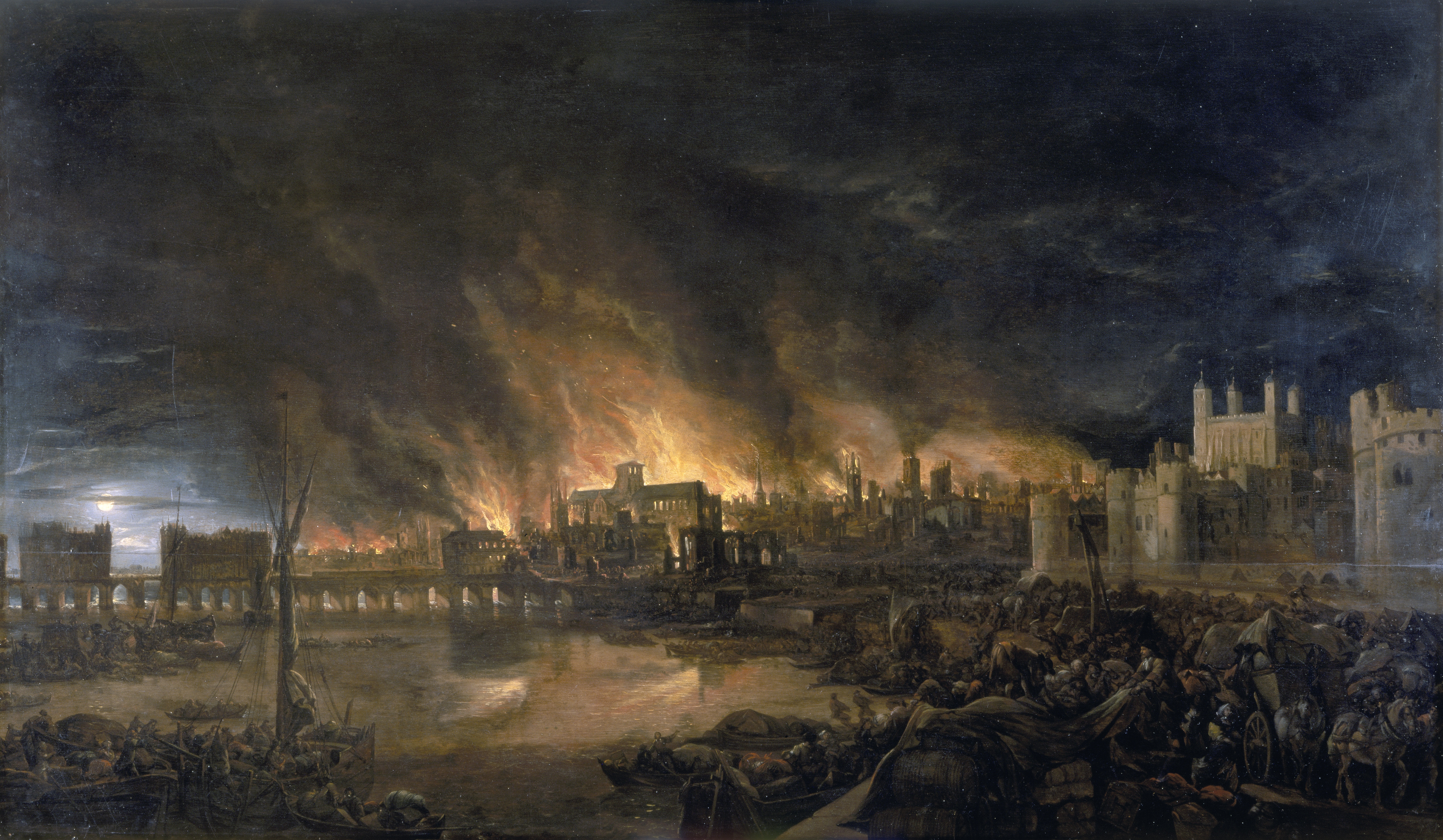
Great Fire of London 1666

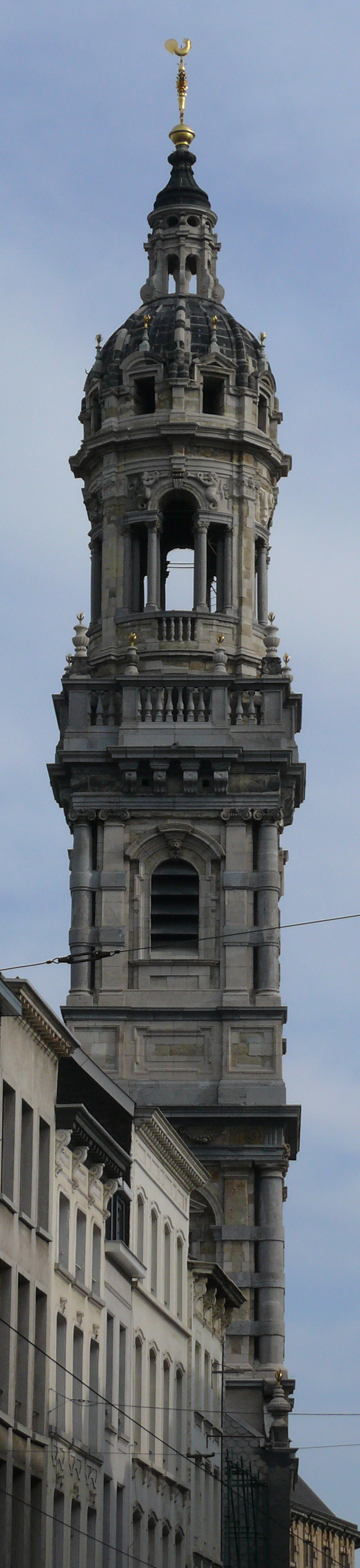
St Carolus Borromeus, Antwerp

Despite its escape in 1633, the church was one of the first buildings to be destroyed in the Great Fire of London in 1666. St Magnus stood less than 300 yards from the bakehouse of Thomas Farriner in Pudding Lane where the fire started. Farriner, a former churchwarden of St Magnus, was buried in the middle aisle of the church on 11 December 1670, perhaps within a temporary structure erected for holding services.

The parish engaged the master mason George Dowdeswell to start the work of rebuilding in 1668. The work was carried forward between 1671 and 1687 under the direction of Sir Christopher Wren, the body of the church being substantially complete by 1676. At a cost of £9,579 19s 10d St Magnus was one of Wren's most expensive churches. The church of St Margaret New Fish Street was not rebuilt after the fire and its parish was united to that of St Magnus.

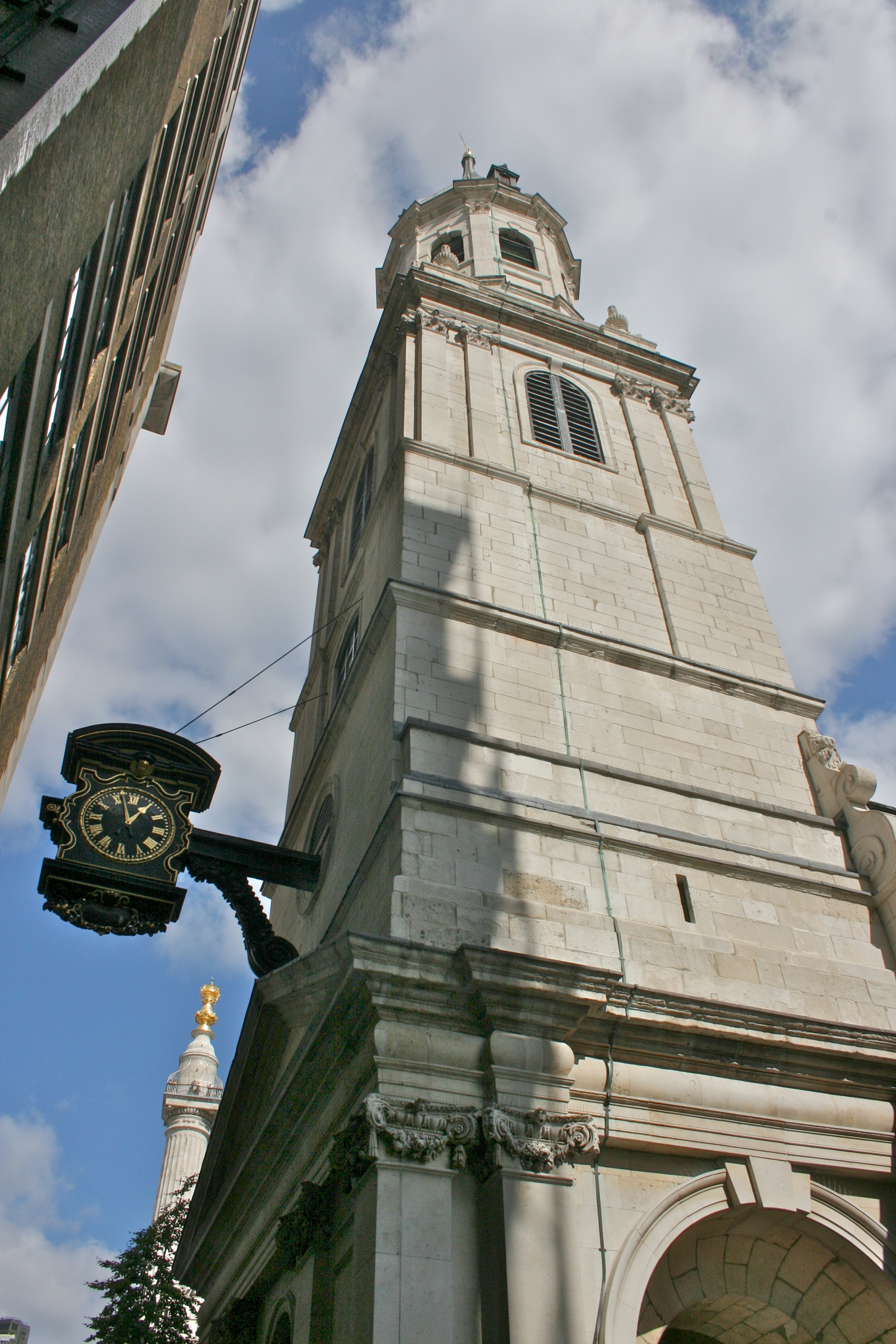
St Magnus the Martyr tower and clock

The chancels of many of Wren's city churches had chequered marble floors and the chancel of St Magnus is an example, the parish agreeing after some debate to place the communion table on a marble ascent with steps and to commission altar rails of Sussex wrought iron. The nave and aisles are paved with freestone flags. A lantern and cupola, closely modelled on the steeple built between 1614 and 1624 by François d'Aguilon and Pieter Huyssens for the church of St Carolus Borromeus in Antwerp, was added between 1703 and 1706. London's skyline was transformed by Wren's tall steeples and that of St Magnus is considered to be one of his finest.

The large clock projecting from the tower was a well-known landmark in the city as it hung over the roadway of Old London Bridge. It was presented to the church in 1709 by Sir Charles Duncombe (Alderman for the Ward of Bridge Within and, in 1708/09, Lord Mayor of London). Tradition says "that it was erected in consequence of a vow made by the donor, who, in the earlier part of his life, had once to wait a considerable time in a cart upon London Bridge, without being able to learn the hour, when he made a promise, that if he ever became successful in the world, he would give to that Church a public clock ... that all passengers might see the time of day." The maker was Langley Bradley, a clockmaker in Fenchurch Street, who had worked for Wren on many other projects, including the clock for the new St Paul's Cathedral. The sword rest in the church, designed to hold the Lord Mayor's sword and mace when he attended divine service "in state", dates from 1708.

Duncombe and his benefactions to St Magnus feature prominently in Daniel Defoe's The True-Born Englishman, a biting satire on critics of William III that went through several editions from 1700 (the year in which Duncombe was elected Sheriff).

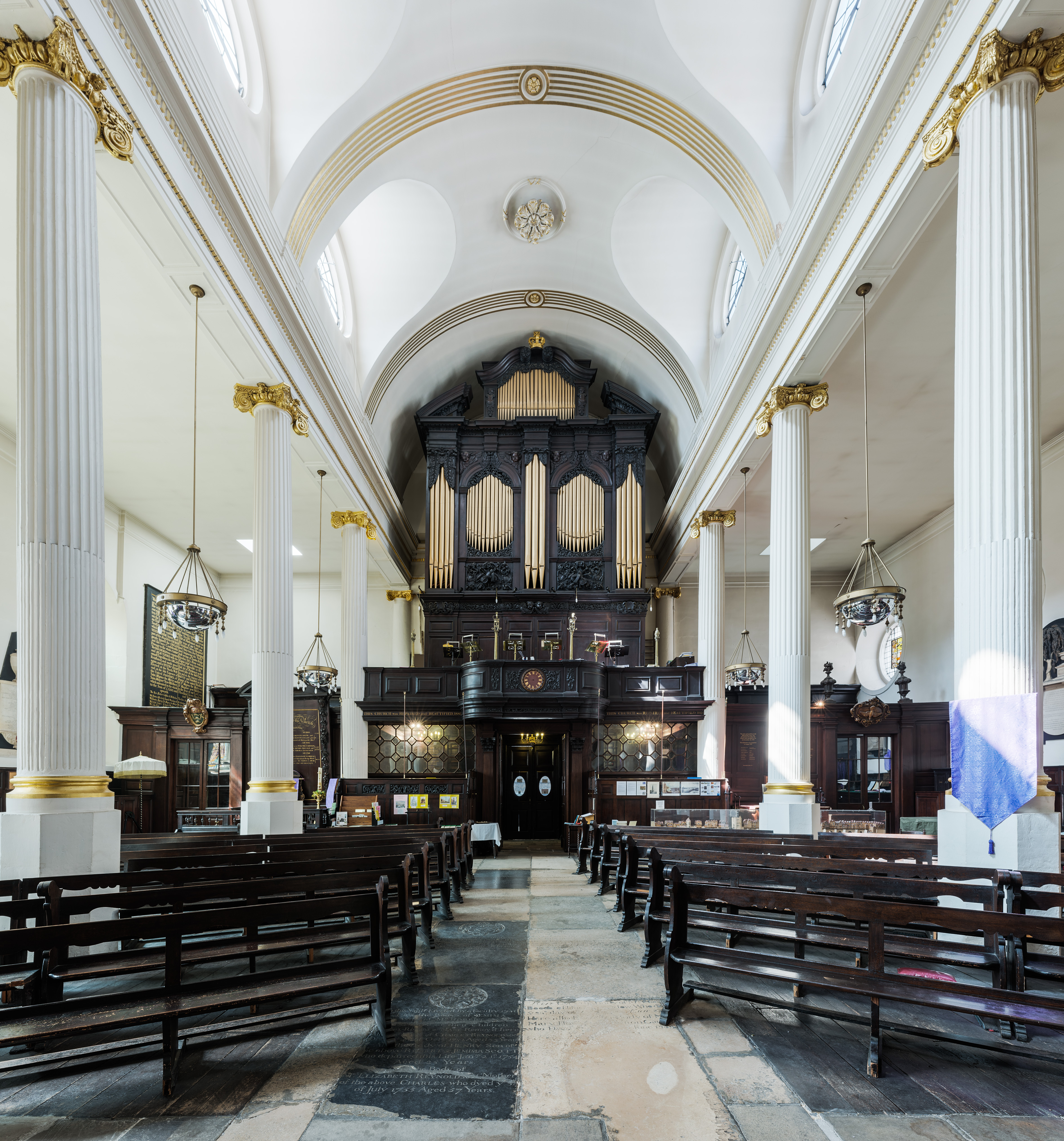
Organ in St Magnus the Martyr

Shortly before his death in 1711, Duncombe commissioned an organ for the church, the first to have a swell-box, by Abraham Jordan (father and son). The Spectator announced that "Whereas Mr Abraham Jordan, senior and junior, have, with their own hands, joinery excepted, made and erected a very large organ in St Magnus' Church, at the foot of London Bridge, consisting of four sets of keys, one of which is adapted to the art of emitting sounds by swelling notes, which never was in any organ before; this instrument will be publicly opened on Sunday next [14 February 1712], the performance by Mr John Robinson. The above-said Abraham Jordan gives notice to all masters and performers, that he will attend every day next week at the said Church, to accommodate all those gentlemen who shall have a curiosity to hear it".

The organ case, which remains in its original state, is looked upon as one of the finest existing examples of the Grinling Gibbons's school of wood carving. The first organist of St Magnus was John Robinson (1682–1762), who served in that role for fifty years (1712–62) and in addition as organist of Westminster Abbey from 1727. Other organists have included Henry Heron (1738–95, organist 1762-95), the blind organist George Warne (1792–1868, organist 1820–26 until his appointment to the Temple Church), James Coward (1824–80, organist 1868–80 who was also organist to the Crystal Palace and renowned for his powers of improvisation) and George Frederick Smith FRCO (1856–1918, organist 1880–1918 and Professor of Music at the Guildhall School of Music). The organ has been restored several times since it was first built: in 1760 by John Sedgewick, 1782 by Thomas Parker and John Frost, 1804 by George Parsons, 1855 by Gray & Davison, 1861 by T Hill & Son, 1879 by Messrs Brindley & Foster, 1891 by Hill & Son, 1924 and, after wartime damage, 1949 by R. Spurden Rutt & Co, and 1997 by Hill, Norman & Beard Sir Peter Maxwell Davies was one of several patrons of the organ appeal in the mid-1990s and John Scott gave an inaugural recital on 20 May 1998 following the completion of that restoration. The instrument has an Historic Organ Certificate and full details are recorded in the National Pipe Organ Register.

The hymn tune "St Magnus", usually sung at Ascensiontide to the text "The head that once was crowned with thorns", was written by Jeremiah Clarke in 1701 and named for the church.

=== Last years of old London Bridge ===
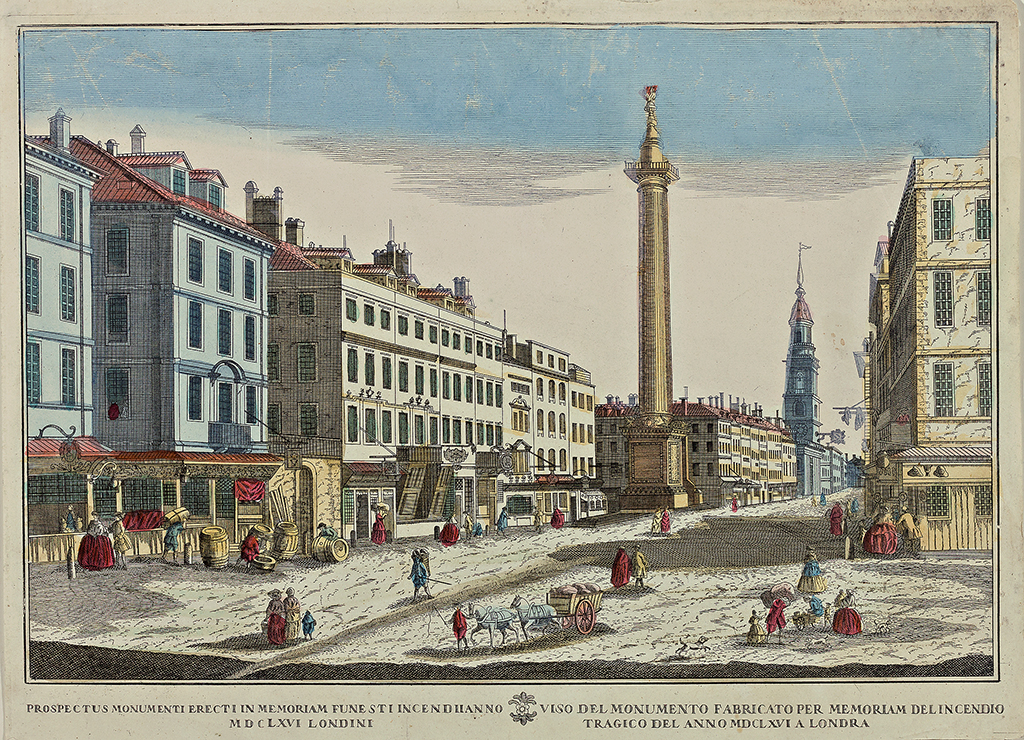
The Monument and St Magnus circa 1750

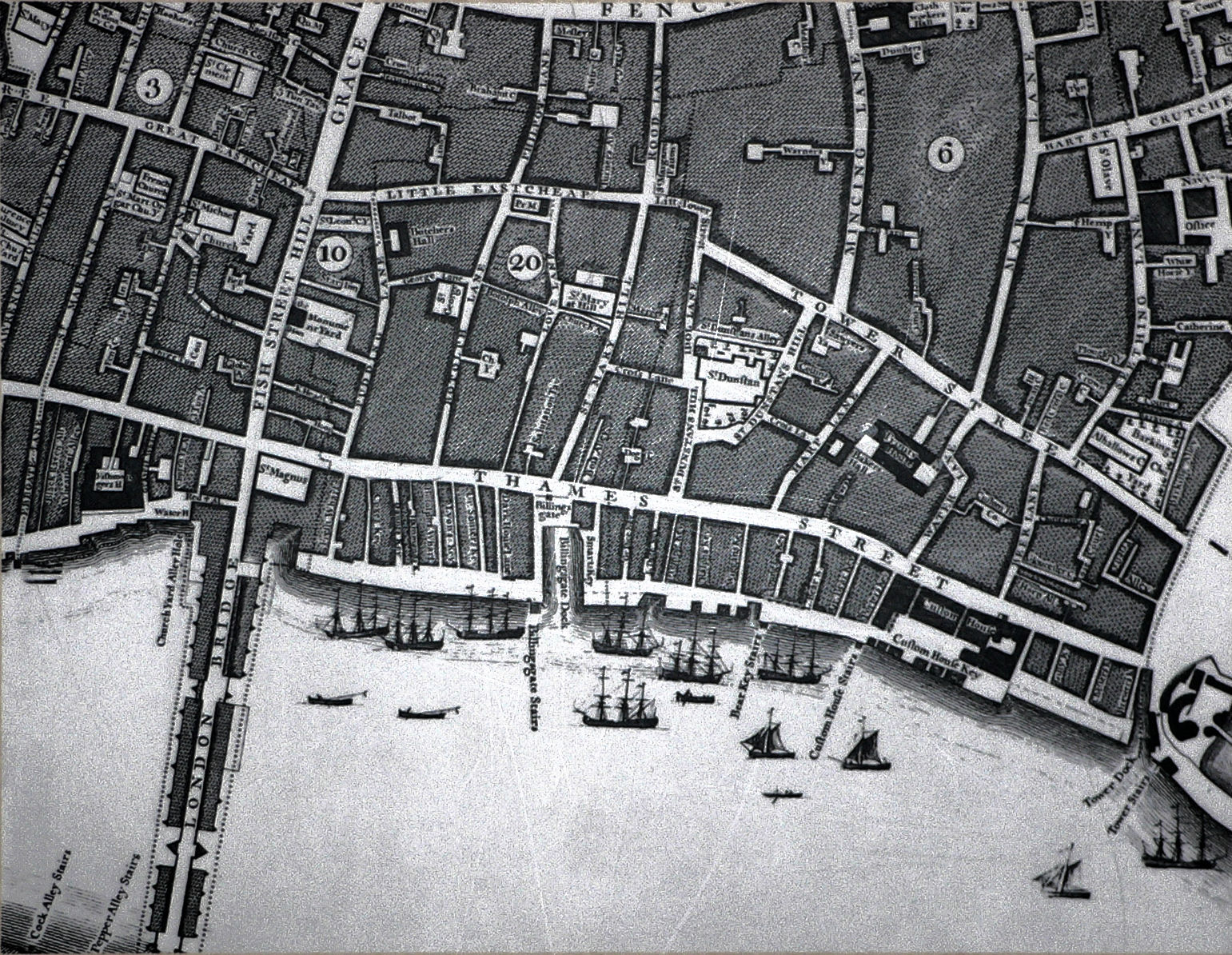
Environs of St Magnus the Martyr in the mid-18th century

Canaletto drew St Magnus and old London Bridge as they appeared in the late 1740s. Between 1756 and 1762, under the London Bridge Improvement Act 1756 (29 Geo. 2. c. 40), the Corporation of London demolished the buildings on London Bridge to widen the roadway, ease traffic congestion and improve safety for pedestrians. The churchwardens' accounts of St Magnus list many payments to those injured on the Bridge and record that in 1752 a man was crushed to death between two carts. In the summer of 1724 the churchwardens had been obliged to spend 1/6 on "Expenses with the churchwardens of Woodford about taking away their pentioner Jane Taverner killed [by a cart] on the Bridge"

After the House of Commons had resolved upon the alteration of London Bridge, the Rev Robert Gibson (Rector 1747-91) applied to the House for relief; stating that 48l. 6s. 2d. per annum, part of his salary of 170l. per annum, was assessed upon houses on London Bridge; which he should utterly lose by their removal unless a clause in the bill about to be passed should provide a remedy. Accordingly, Sections 18 and 19 of London Bridge Improvement Act 1756 provided that the relevant amounts of tithe and poor rate should be a charge on the Bridge House Estates.

A serious fire broke out on 18 April 1760 in an oil shop at the south-east corner of the church, which consumed most of the church roof and did considerable damage to the fabric. The fire burnt warehouses to the south of the church and a number of houses on the northern end of London Bridge.

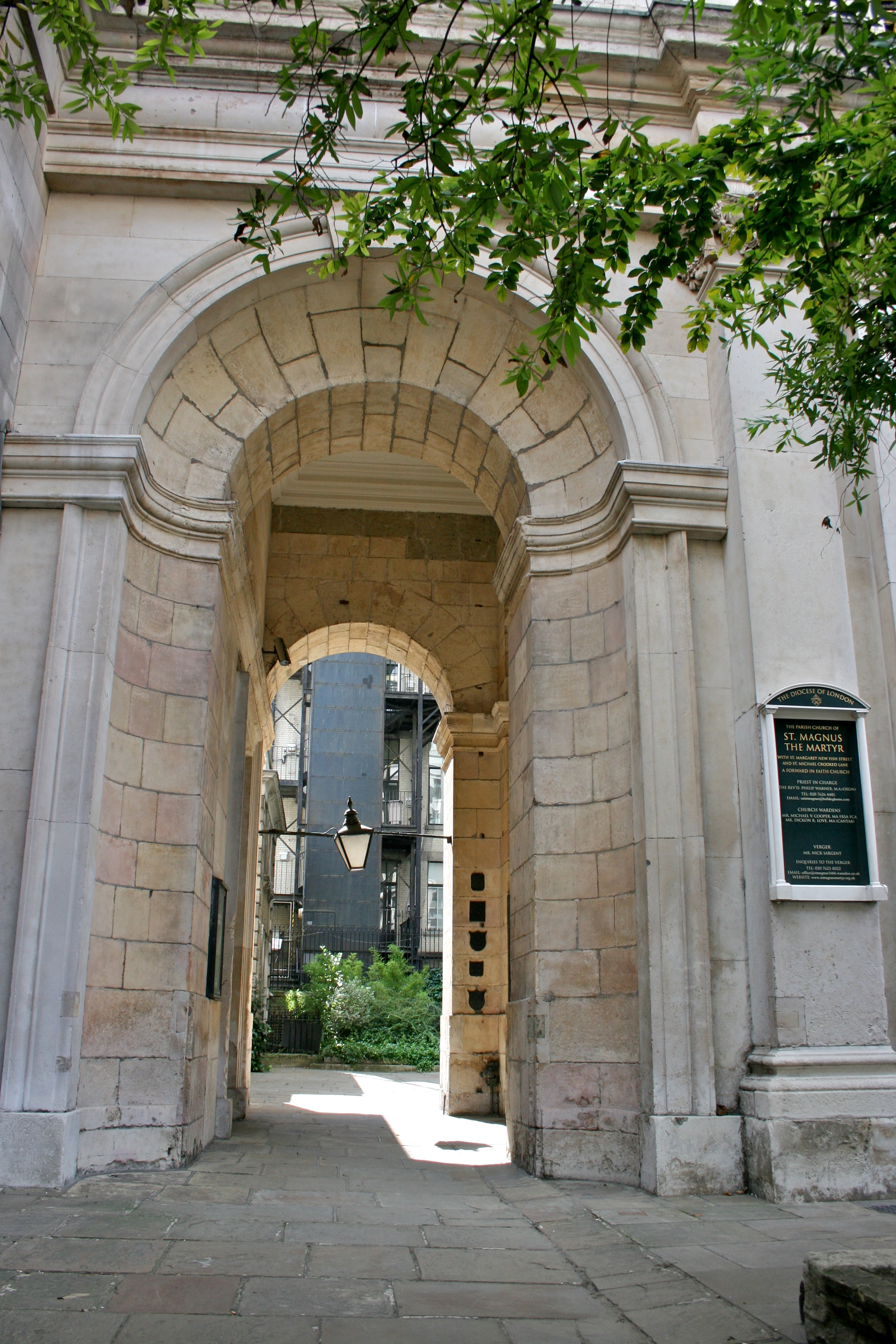
Pathway under the tower of the church

As part of the bridge improvements, overseen by the architect Sir Robert Taylor, a new pedestrian walkway was built along the eastern side of the bridge. With the other buildings gone St Magnus blocked the new walkway. As a consequence it was necessary in 1762 to 1763 to remove the vestry rooms at the West end of the church and open up the side arches of the tower so that people could pass underneath the tower. The tower's lower storey thus became an external porch and two windows were lost from the north facade. Internally a lobby was created at the West end under the organ gallery and a screen with fine octagonal glazing inserted. A new vestry was built to the south of the church. The Act also provided that the land taken from the church for the widening was "to be considered ... as part of the cemetery of the said church ... but if the pavement thereof be broken up on account of the burying of any persons, the same shall be ... made good ... by the churchwardens".

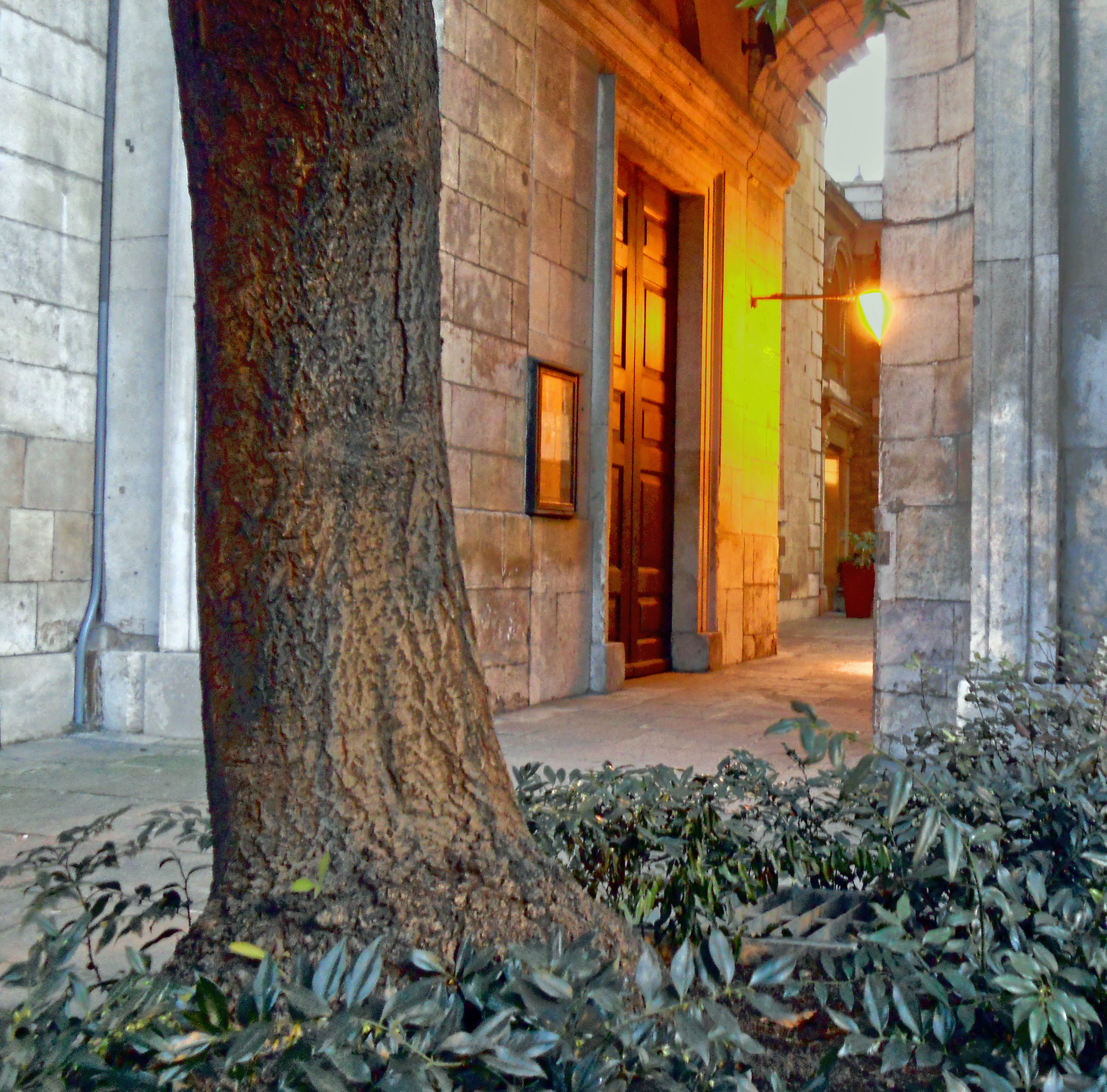
Pathway under the tower showing the entrance to the church

Soldiers were stationed in the Vestry House of St Magnus during the Gordon Riots in June 1780.

By 1782 the noise level from the activities of Billingsgate Fish Market had become unbearable and the large windows on the north side of the church were blocked up leaving only circular windows high up in the wall. The parapet and pediment above the north aisle door were probably removed at the same time. At some point between the 1760s and 1814 the present clerestory was constructed with its oval windows and fluted and coffered plasterwork. J. M. W. Turner painted the church in the mid-1790s.

The rector of St Magnus between 1792 and 1808, following the death of Robert Gibson on 28 July 1791, was Thomas Rennell FRS. Rennell was President of Sion College in 1806/07. There is a monument to Thomas Leigh (Rector 1808–48 and President of Sion College 1829/30), at St Peter's Church, Goldhanger in Essex. Richard Hazard (1761–1837) was connected with the church as sexton, parish clerk and ward beadle for nearly 50 years and served as Master of the Parish Clerks' Company in 1831/32.

In 1825 the church was "repaired and beautified at a very considerable expense. During the reparation the east window, which had been closed, was restored, and the interior of the fabric conformed to the state in which it was left by its great architect, Sir Christopher Wren. The magnificent organ ... was taken down and rebuilt by Mr Parsons, and re-opened, with the church, on the 12th February, 1826". Unfortunately, as a contemporary writer records, "On the night of the 31st of July, 1827, [the church's] safety was threatened by the great fire which consumed the adjacent warehouses, and it is perhaps owing to the strenuous and praiseworthy exertions of the firemen, that the structure exists at present. ... divine service was suspended and not resumed until the 20th January 1828. In the interval the church received such tasteful and elegant decorations, that it may now compete with any church in the metropolis."

=== New London Bridge: a changing environment ===
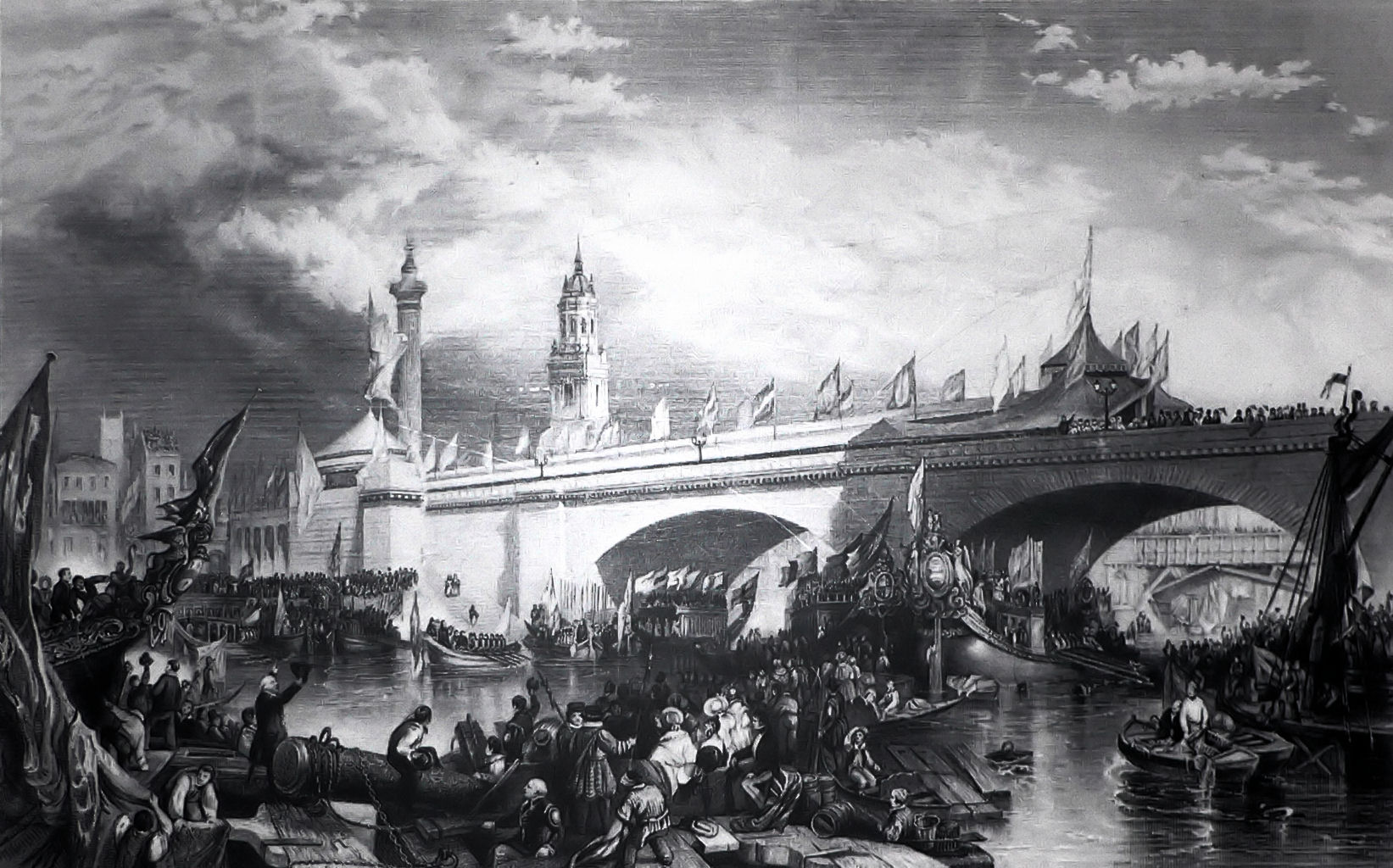
Opening of the new London Bridge in 1831

In 1823 royal assent was given to 'An Act for the Rebuilding of London Bridge' and in 1825 John Garratt, Lord Mayor and Alderman of the Ward of Bridge Within, laid the first stone of the new London Bridge. In 1831 Sir John Rennie's new bridge was opened further upstream and the old bridge demolished. St Magnus ceased to be the gateway to London as it had been for over 600 years. Peter de Colechurch had been buried in the crypt of the chapel on the bridge and his bones were unceremoniously dumped in the River Thames. In 1921 two stones from Old London Bridge were discovered across the road from the church. They now stand in the churchyard.

Wren's church of St Michael Crooked Lane was demolished, the final service on Sunday 20 March 1831 having to be abandoned due to the effects of the building work. The Rector of St Michael preached a sermon the following Sunday at St Magnus lamenting the demolition of his church with its monuments and "the disturbance of the worship of his parishioners on the preceding Sabbath". The parish of St Michael Crooked Lane was united to that of St Magnus, which itself lost a burial ground in Church Yard Alley to the approach road for the new bridge. However, in substitution it had restored to it the land taken for the widening of the old bridge in 1762 and was also given part of the approach lands to the east of the old bridge. In 1838 the Committee for the London Bridge Approaches reported to Common Council that new burial grounds had been provided for the parishes of St Michael, Crooked Lane and St Magnus, London Bridge.

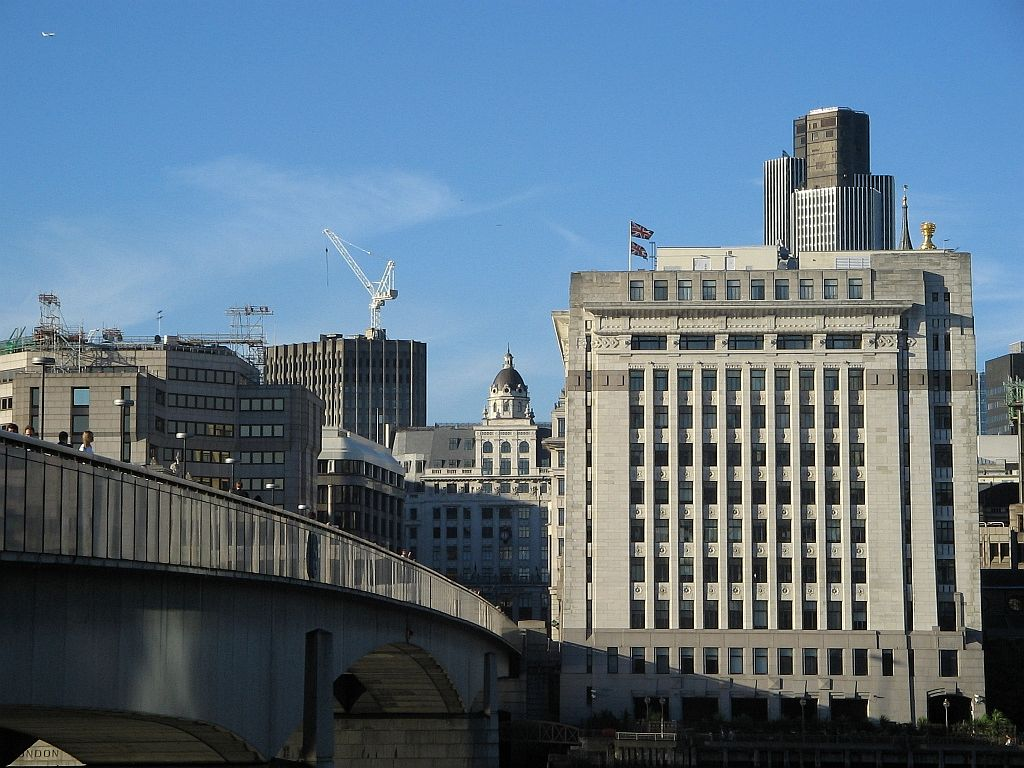
London Bridge in 2005

Depictions of St Magnus after the building of the new bridge, seen behind Fresh Wharf and the new London Bridge Wharf, include paintings by W. Fenoulhet in 1841 and by Charles Ginner in 1913. This prospect was affected in 1924 by the building of Adelaide House to a design by John James Burnet, The Times commenting that "the new 'architectural Matterhorn' ... conceals all but the tip of the church spire". There was, however, an excellent view of the church for a few years between the demolition of Adelaide Buildings and the erection of its replacement. Adelaide House is now listed. Regis House, on the site of the abandoned King William Street terminus of the City & South London Railway (subsequently the Northern Line), and the Steam Packet Inn, on the corner of Lower Thames Street and Fish Street Hill, were developed in 1931.

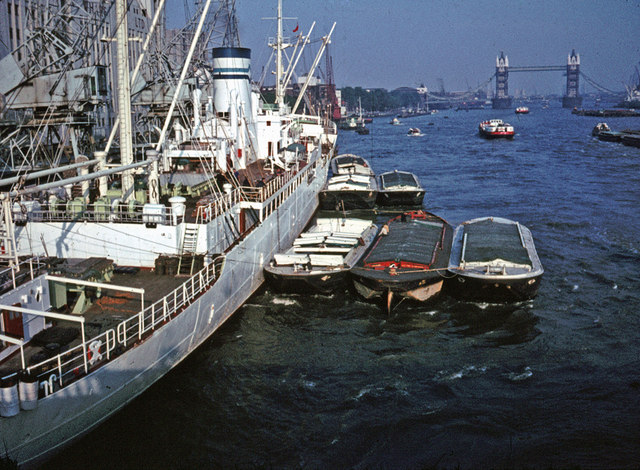
New Fresh Wharf c1970

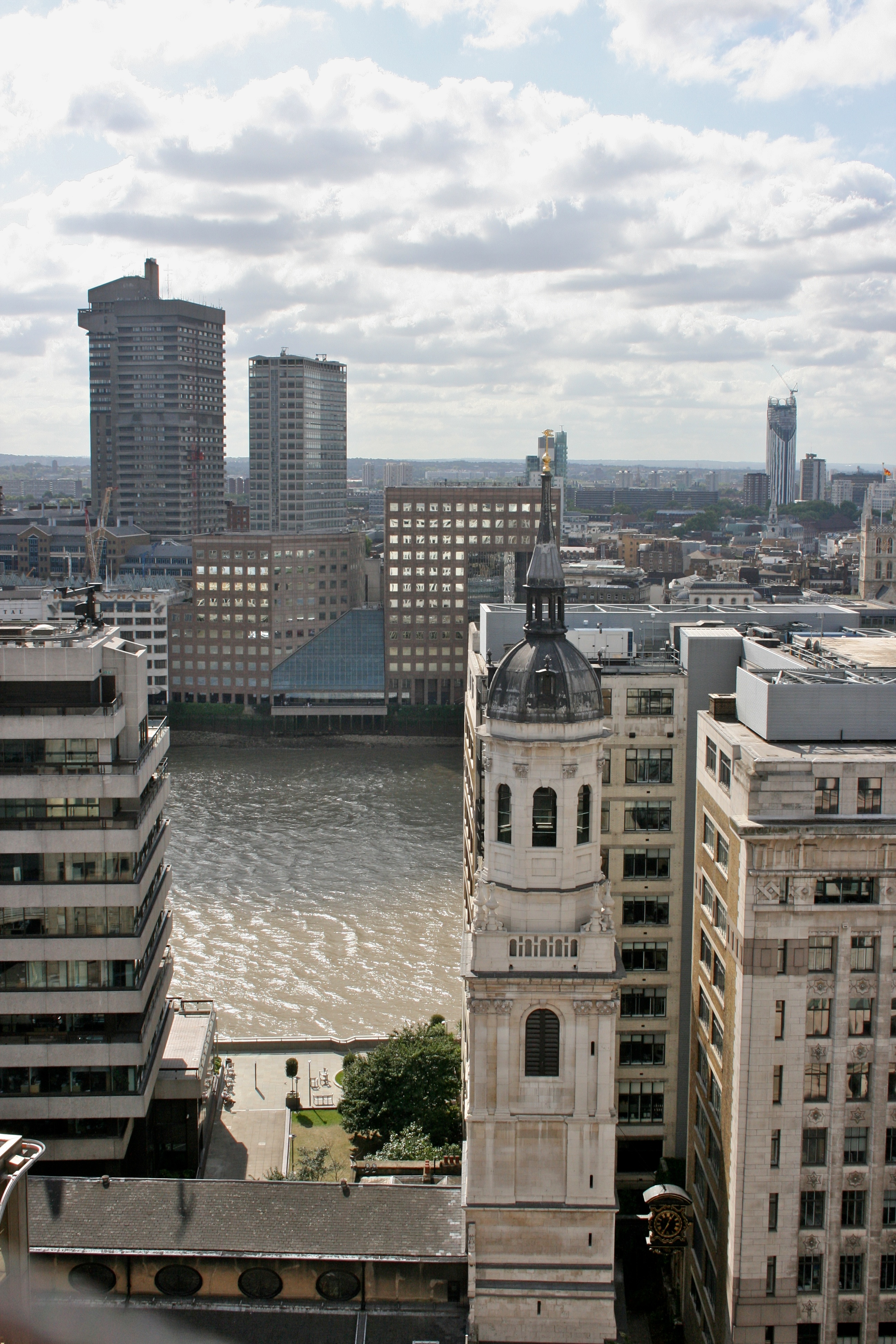
St Magnus the Martyr viewed from top of The Monument

By the early 1960s traffic congestion had become a problem and Lower Thames Street was widened over the next decade to form part of a significant new east–west transport artery (the A3211). The setting of the church was further affected by the construction of a new London Bridge between 1967 and 1973. The New Fresh Wharf warehouse to the east of the church, built in 1939, was demolished in 1973-4 following the collapse of commercial traffic in the Pool of London and, after an archaeological excavation, St Magnus House was constructed on the site in 1978 to a design by R. Seifert & Partners. This development now allows a clear view of the church from the east side. The site to the south-east of The Monument (between Fish Street Hill and Pudding Lane), formerly predominantly occupied by fish merchants, was redeveloped as Centurion House and Gartmore (now Providian) House at the time of the closure of old Billingsgate Market in January 1982. A comprehensive redevelopment of Centurion House (renamed Monument Place) began in October 2011 and the building was let in 2014. Regis House, to the south-west of The Monument, was redeveloped by Land Securities PLC in 1998.

The vista from The Monument south to the River Thames, over the roof of St Magnus, is protected under the City of London Unitary Development Plan, although the South bank of the river is now dominated by The Shard. Since 2004 the City of London Corporation has been exploring ways of enhancing the Riverside Walk to the south of St Magnus. Work on a new staircase to connect London Bridge to the Riverside Walk is due to commence in March 2013. The story of St Magnus's relationship with London Bridge and an interview with the rector featured in the television programme The Bridges That Built London with Dan Cruickshank, first broadcast on BBC Four on 14 June 2012. The City Corporation's 'Fenchurch and Monument Area Enhancement Strategy' of August 2012 recommended ways of reconnecting St Magnus and the riverside to the area north of Lower Thames Street.

=== Late 19th century and early 20th century ===
A lectureship at St Michael, Crooked Lane, which was transferred to St Magnus in 1831, was endowed by the wills of Thomas and Susannah Townsend in 1789 and 1812 respectively. The Revd Henry Robert Huckin, Headmaster of Repton School from 1874 to 1882, was appointed Townsend Lecturer at St Magnus in 1871.

St Magnus narrowly escaped damage from a major fire in Lower Thames Street in October 1849.

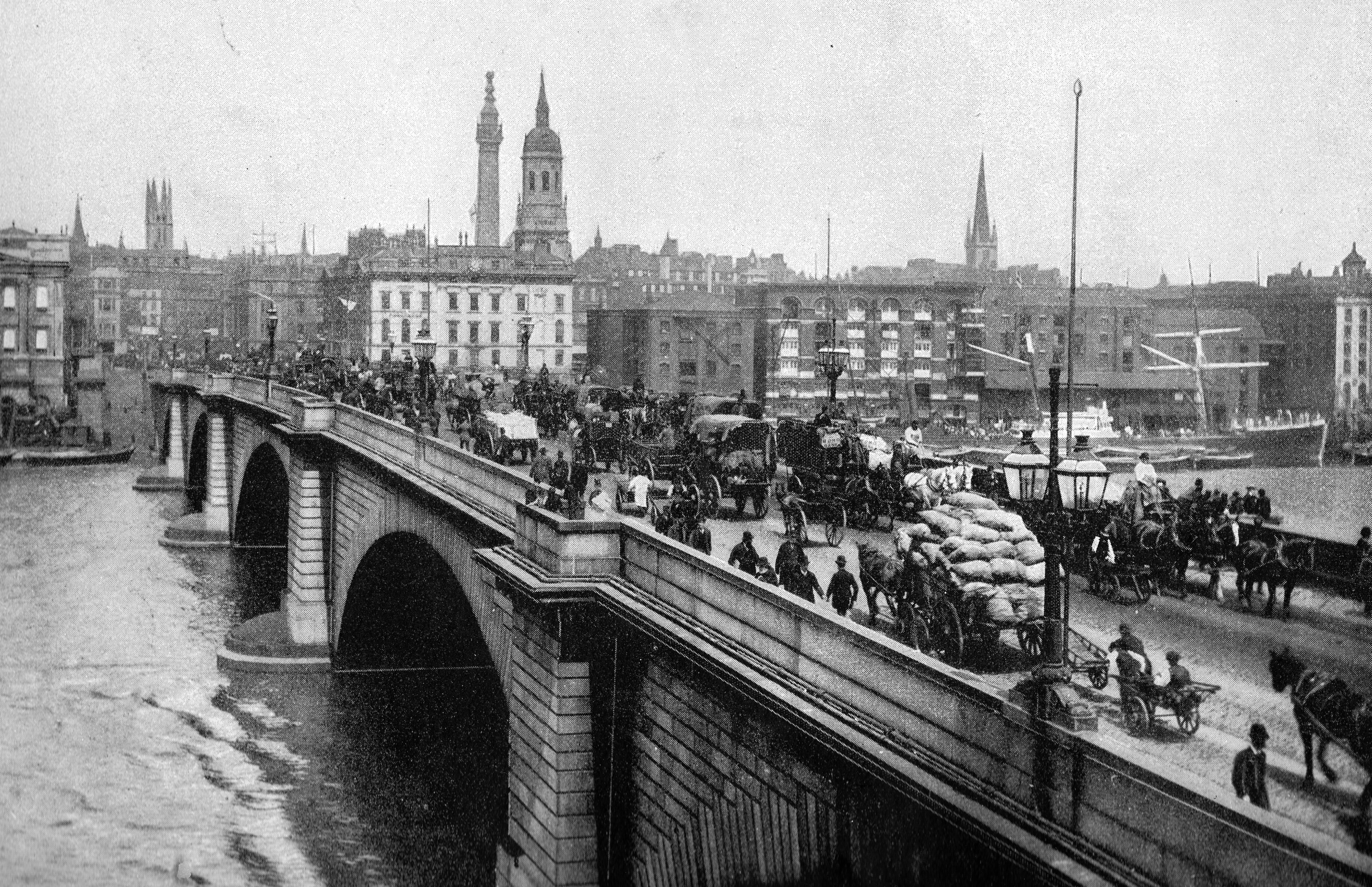
London Bridge and St Magnus the Martyr circa 1900

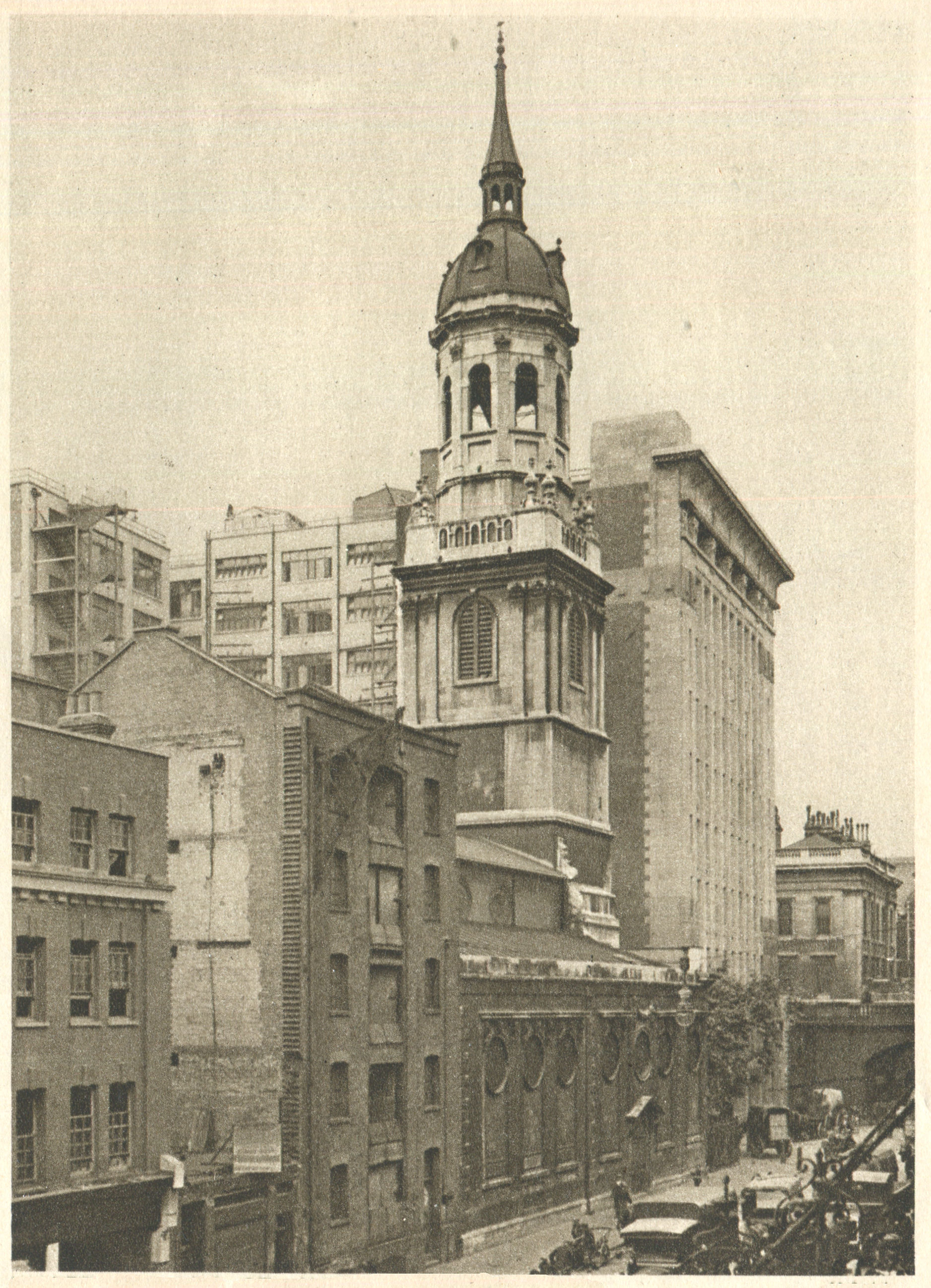
The church in 1927

During the second half of the 19th century the rectors were Alexander McCaul (1799–1863, Rector 1850–63), who coined the term "Judaeo Christian" in a letter dated 17 October 1821, and his son Alexander Israel McCaul (1835–1899, curate 1859–63, rector 1863–99). Another son, Joseph Benjamin McCaul (1827–92) served as curate from 1851 to 1854. The Revd Alexander McCaul Sr was a Christian missionary to the Polish Jews, who (having declined an offer to become the first Anglican bishop in Jerusalem) was appointed professor of Hebrew and rabbinical literature at King's College London in 1841. His daughter, Elizabeth Finn (1825–1921), a noted linguist, was the wife of James Finn, the British Consul in Jerusalem from 1846 to 1863. She founded a number of organizations including the Jerusalem Literary Society, which was the forerunner to the Palestine Exploration Fund, the Society for the Relief of Persecuted Jews (Syrian Colonization Fund) and the Distressed Gentlefolk Aid Association (now known as Elizabeth Finn Care). Both McCaul and his daughter worked closely with Lord Shaftesbury.

In 1890 it was reported that the Bishop of London was to hold an inquiry as to the desirability of uniting the benefices of St George Botolph Lane and St Magnus. The expectation was a fusion of the two livings, the demolition of St George's and the pensioning of "William Gladstone's favourite Canon", Malcolm MacColl. Although services ceased there, St George's was not demolished until 1904. The parish was then merged with St Mary at Hill rather than St Magnus.

The patronage of the living was acquired in the late 19th century by Sir Henry Peek, Senior Partner of Peek Brothers & Co of 20 Eastcheap, the country's largest firm of wholesale tea brokers and dealers, and Chairman of the Commercial Union Assurance Co. Peek was a generous philanthropist who was instrumental in saving both Wimbledon Common and Burnham Beeches from development. His grandson, Sir Wilfred Peek, presented a cousin, Richard Peek, as rector in 1904. Peek, an ardent Freemason, held the office of Grand Chaplain of England. The Times recorded that his memorial service in July 1920 "was of a semi-Masonic character, Mr Peek having been a prominent Freemason". In June 1895 Peek had saved the life of a young French girl who jumped overboard from a ferry midway between Dinard and St Malo in Brittany and was awarded the bronze medal of the Royal Humane Society and the Gold Medal 1st Class of the Sociâetâe Nationale de Sauvetage de France.

In November 1898 a memorial service was held at St Magnus for Sir Stuart Knill (1824–1898), head of the firm of John Knill and Co, wharfingers, and formerly Lord Mayor and Master of the Plumbers' Company. This was the first such service for a Roman Catholic taken in an Anglican church. Sir Stuart's son, Sir John Knill (1856–1934), also served as Alderman for the Ward of Bridge Within, Lord Mayor and Master of the Plumbers' Company.

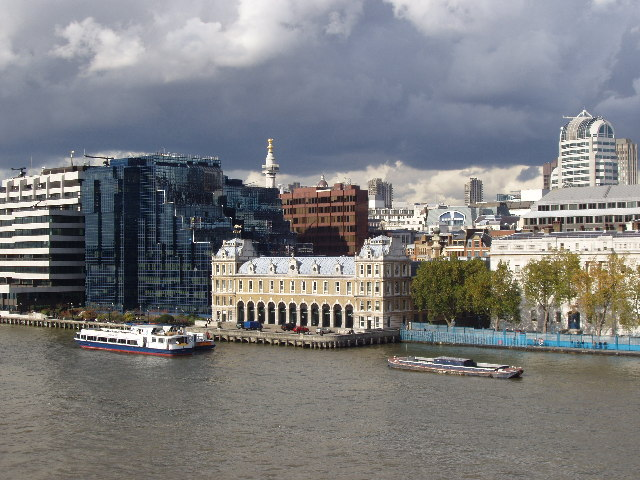
Old Billingsgate Market

Until 1922 the annual Fish Harvest Festival was celebrated at St Magnus. The service moved in 1923 to St Dunstan in the East and then to St Mary at Hill, but St Magnus retained close links with the local fish merchants until the closure of old Billingsgate Market. St Magnus, in the 1950s, was "buried in the stink of Billingsgate fish-market, against which incense was a welcome antidote".

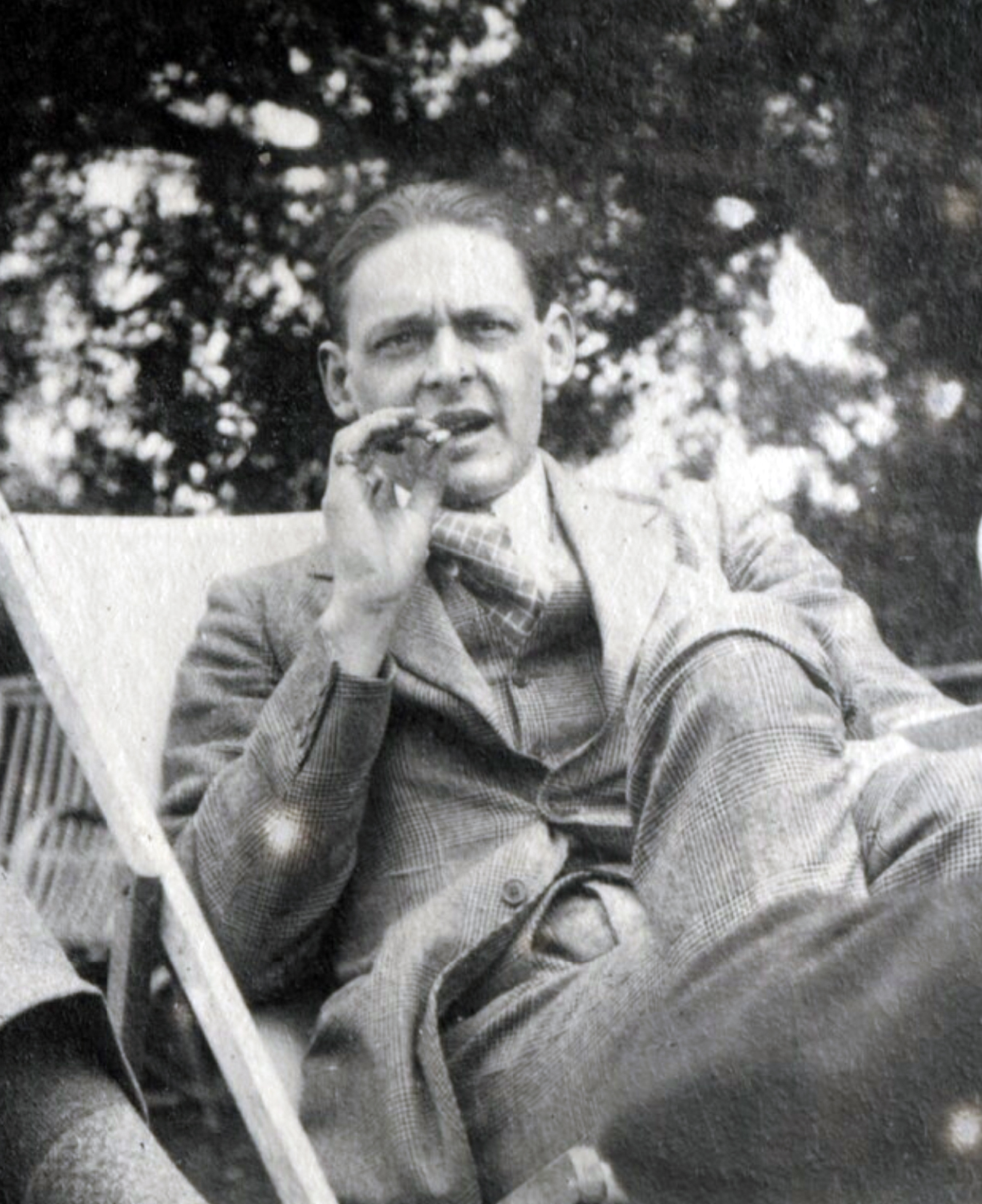
T. S. Eliot

A report in 1920 from a committee chaired by Lord Phillimore proposed the demolition of nineteen City churches, including St Magnus. A general outcry from members of the public and parishioners alike prevented the execution of this plan. The members of the City Livery Club passed a resolution that they regarded "with horror and indignation the proposed demolition of 19 City churches" and pledged the club to do everything in its power to prevent such a catastrophe. T. S. Eliot wrote that the threatened churches gave "to the business quarter of London a beauty which its hideous banks and commercial houses have not quite defaced. ... the least precious redeems some vulgar street ... The loss of these towers, to meet the eye down a grimy lane, and of these empty naves, to receive the solitary visitor at noon from the dust and tumult of Lombard Street, will be irreparable and unforgotten."

The London County Council published a report concluding that St Magnus was "one of the most beautiful of all Wren's works" and "certainly one of the churches which should not be demolished without specially good reasons and after very full consideration." Due to the uncertainty about the church's future, the patron decided to defer action to fill the vacancy in the benefice and a curate-in-charge temporarily took responsibility for the parish. However, on 23 April 1921 it was announced that the Revd Henry Joy Fynes-Clinton would be the new rector. The Times concluded that the appointment, with the bishop's approval, meant that the proposed demolition would not be carried out. Fr Fynes-Clinton was inducted on 31 May 1921. A further attempt to implement the recommendations of the Phillimore Report in 1926 was resisted by the Earl of Crawford in a debate in the House of Lords on 15 July 1926 who quoted "to your Lordships the list of these condemned churches. It will not take a moment. Even their fine resounding names are worthy of quotation.... St. Magnus the Martyr – many of your Lordships must know that wonderful church by the water's edge down below London Bridge".

The rectory, built by Robert Smirke in 1833–5, was at 39 King William Street. A decision was taken in 1909 to sell the property, the intention being to purchase a new rectory in the suburbs, but the sale fell through and at the time of the 1910 Land Tax Valuations the building was being let out to a number of tenants. The rectory was sold by the diocese on 30 May 1921 for £8,000 to Ridgways Limited, which owned the adjoining premises. The Vestry House adjoining the south-west of the church, replacing the one built in the 1760s, may also have been by Smirke. Part of the burial ground of St Michael, Crooked Lane, located between Fish Street Hill and King William Street, survived as an open space until 1987 when it was compulsorily purchased to facilitate the extension of the Docklands Light Railway into the City. The bodies were reburied at Brookwood Cemetery.

=== Between the wars: Fr Fynes and the Anglo-Catholic tradition ===
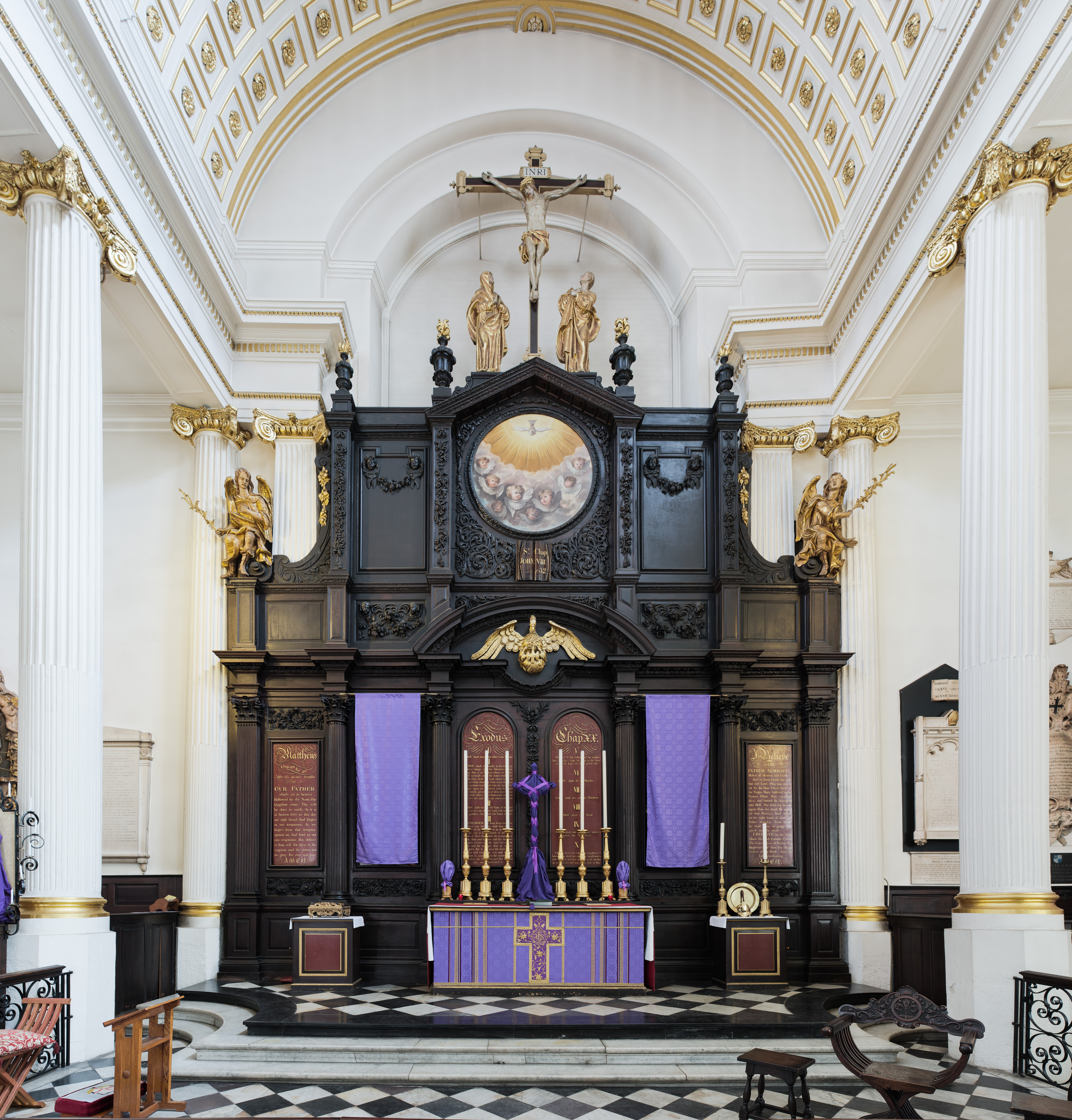
The altar of St Magnus the Martyr veiled during Lent

The interior of the church was restored by Martin Travers in 1924, in a neo-baroque style, reflecting the Anglo-Catholic character of the congregation following the appointment of Henry Joy Fynes-Clinton as rector. Fynes-Clinton served as rector of St Magnus from 31 May 1921 until his death on 4 December 1959 and substantially beautified the interior of the church.

Fynes-Clinton held very strong Anglo-Catholic views, and proceeded to make St Magnus as much like a baroque Roman Catholic church as possible. However, "he was such a loveable character with an old-world courtesy which was irresistible, that it was difficult for anyone to be unpleasant to him, however much they might disapprove of his views". He generally said the Roman Mass in Latin; and in personality was "grave, grand, well-connected and holy, with a laconic sense of humour". To a Protestant who had come to see Coverdale's monument he is reported to have said "We have just had a service in the language out of which he translated the Bible." The use of Latin in services was not, however, without grammatical danger. A response from his parishioners of "Ora pro nobis" after "Omnes sancti Angeli et Archangeli" in the Litany of the Saints would elicit a pause and the correction "No, Orate pro nobis."

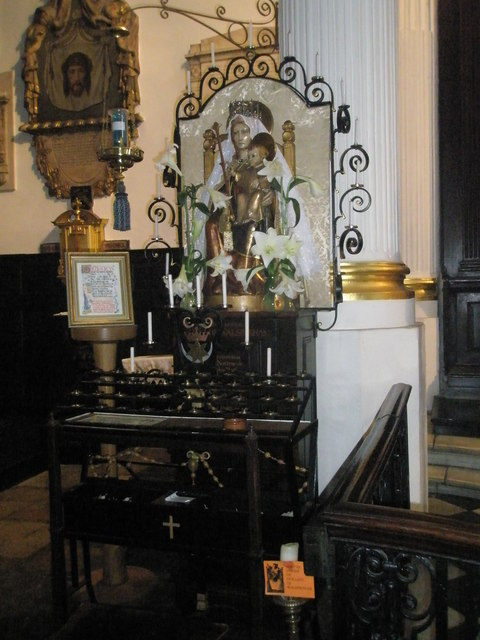
Shrine of Our Lady of Walsingham in St Magnus the Martyr

In 1922 Fynes-Clinton refounded the Fraternity of Our Lady de Salve Regina. The fraternity's badge is shown in the stained glass window at the east end of the north wall of the church above the reredos of the Lady Chapel altar. He also erected a statue of Our Lady of Walsingham and arranged pilgrimages to the Norfolk shrine, where he was one of the founding guardians. In 1928 the journal of the Catholic League reported that St Magnus had presented a votive candle to the shrine at Walsingham "in token of our common Devotion and the mutual sympathy and prayers that are we hope a growing bond between the peaceful country shrine and the church in the heart of the hurrying City, from the Altar of which the Pilgrimages regularly start".

Fynes-Clinton was General Secretary of the Anglican and Eastern Orthodox Churches Union and its successor, the Anglican and Eastern Churches Association, from 1906 to 1920 and served as Secretary to the Archbishop of Canterbury's Eastern Churches Committee from 1920 to around 1924. A Solemn Requiem was celebrated at St Magnus in September 1921 for the late King Peter of the Serbs, Croats and Slovenes.

At the midday service on 1 March 1922, Ash Wednesday, J. A. Kensit, leader of the Protestant Truth Society, got up and protested against the form of worship. The proposed changes to the church in 1924 led to a hearing in the Consistory Court of the Chancellor of the Diocese of London and an appeal to the Court of Arches. Judgement was given by the latter Court in October 1924. The advowson was purchased in 1931, without the knowledge of the Rector and Parochial Church Council, by the evangelical Sir Charles King-Harman. A number of such cases, including the purchase of the advowsons of Clapham and Hampstead Parish Churches by Sir Charles, led to the passage of the Benefices (Purchase of Rights of Patronage) Measure 1933. This allowed the parishioners of St Magnus to purchase the advowson from Sir Charles King-Harman for £1,300 in 1934 and transfer it to the Patronage Board.

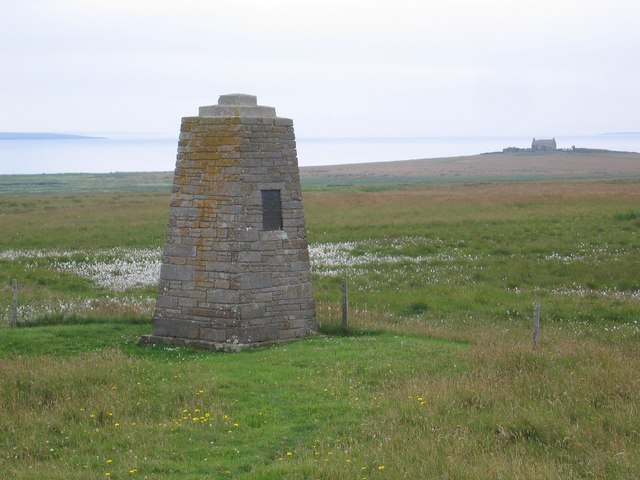
Memorial to St Magnus on Egilsay

St Magnus was one of the churches that held special services before the opening of the second Anglo-Catholic Congress in 1923. Fynes-Clinton was the first incumbent to hold lunchtime services for City workers. Pathé News filmed the Palm Sunday procession at St Magnus in 1935. In The Towers of Trebizond, the novel by Rose Macaulay published in 1956, Fr Chantry-Pigg's church is described as being several feet higher than St Mary's, Bourne Street and some inches above even St Magnus the Martyr.

In July 1937 Fr Fynes-Clinton, with two members of his congregation, travelled to Kirkwall to be present at the 800th anniversary celebrations of St Magnus Cathedral, Kirkwall. During their stay they visited Egilsay and were shown the spot where St Magnus had been slain. Later Fynes-Clinton was present at a service held at the roofless church of St Magnus on Egilsay, where he suggested to his host Mr Fryer, the minister of the Cathedral, that the congregations of Kirkwall and London should unite to erect a permanent stone memorial on the traditional site where Earl Magnus had been murdered. In 1938 a cairn was built of local stone on Egilsay. It stands 12 feet high and is 6 feet broad at its base. The memorial was dedicated on 7 September 1938 and a bronze inscription on the monument reads "erected by the Rector and Congregation of St Magnus the Martyr by London Bridge and the Minister and Congregation of St Magnus Cathedral, Kirkwall to commemorate the traditional spot where Earl Magnus was slain, AD circa 1116 and to commemorate the Octocentenary of St Magnus Cathedral 1937".

=== World War II to 21st century ===
A bomb which fell on London Bridge in 1940 during the Blitz of World War II blew out all the windows and damaged the plasterwork and the roof of the north aisle. However, the church was designated a Grade I listed building on 4 January 1950 and repaired in 1951, being re-opened for worship in June of that year by the Bishop of London, William Wand. The architect was Laurence King. "At St Magnus the Martyr almost the whole of the plaster work had to be reproduced. Fortunately, as in some other cases, the furniture had been safely stored, but against £16,000 only £9,000 was recoverable." Restoration and redecoration work has subsequently been carried out several times, including after a fire in the early hours of 4 November 1995. Cleaning of the exterior stonework was completed in 2010.

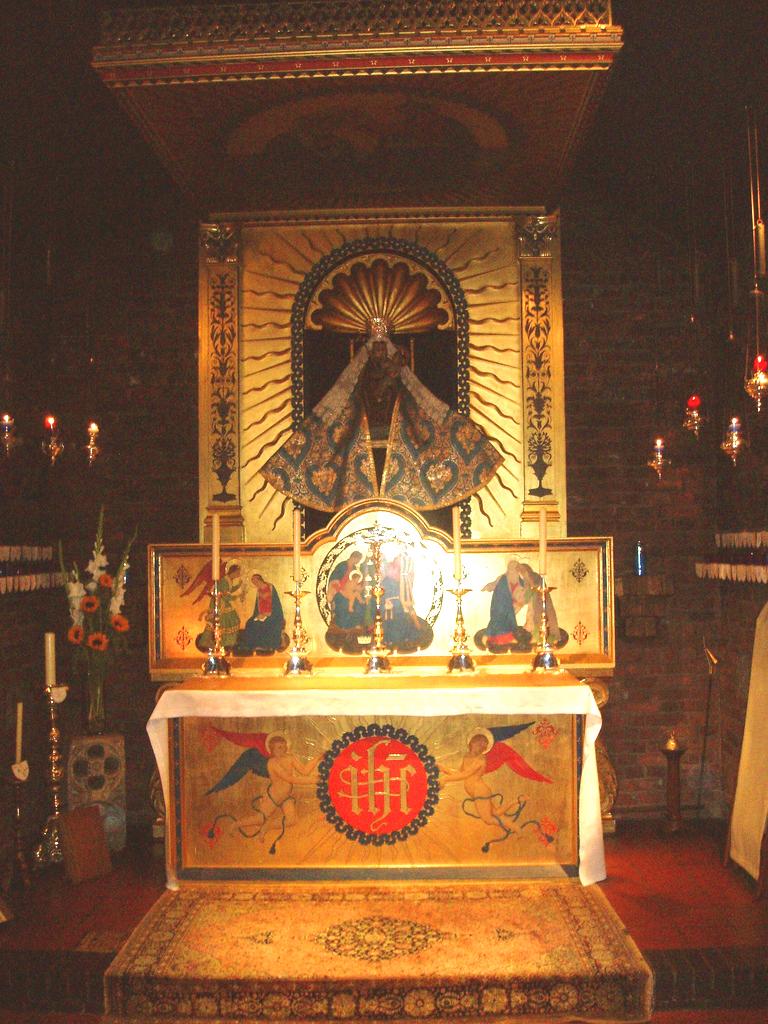
The Holy House at Walsingham

Some minor changes were made to the parish boundary in 1954, including the transfer to St Magnus of an area between Fish Street Hill and Pudding Lane. The site of St Leonard Eastcheap, a church that was not rebuilt after the Great Fire, is therefore now in the parish of St Magnus despite being united to St Edmund the King.

Fr Fynes-Clinton marked the 50th anniversary of his priesthood in May 1952 with High Mass at St Magnus and lunch at Fishmongers' Hall. On 20 September 1956 a solemn Mass was sung in St Magnus to commence the celebration of the 25th anniversary of the restoration of the Holy House at Walsingham in 1931. In the evening of that day a reception was held in the large chamber of Caxton Hall, when between three and four hundred guests assembled.

Fr Fynes-Clinton was succeeded as rector in 1960 by Fr Colin Gill, formerly Vicar of St Martin's Brighton, who remained as incumbent until his death in 1983. Fr Gill was also closely connected with Walsingham and served as a Guardian between 1953 and 1983, including nine years as Master of the College of Guardians. He celebrated the Mass at the first National Pilgrimage in 1959 and presided over the Jubilee celebrations to mark the 50th anniversary of the Shrine in 1981, having been present at the Holy House's opening. A number of the congregation of St Stephen's Lewisham moved to St Magnus around 1960, following temporary changes in the form of worship there.

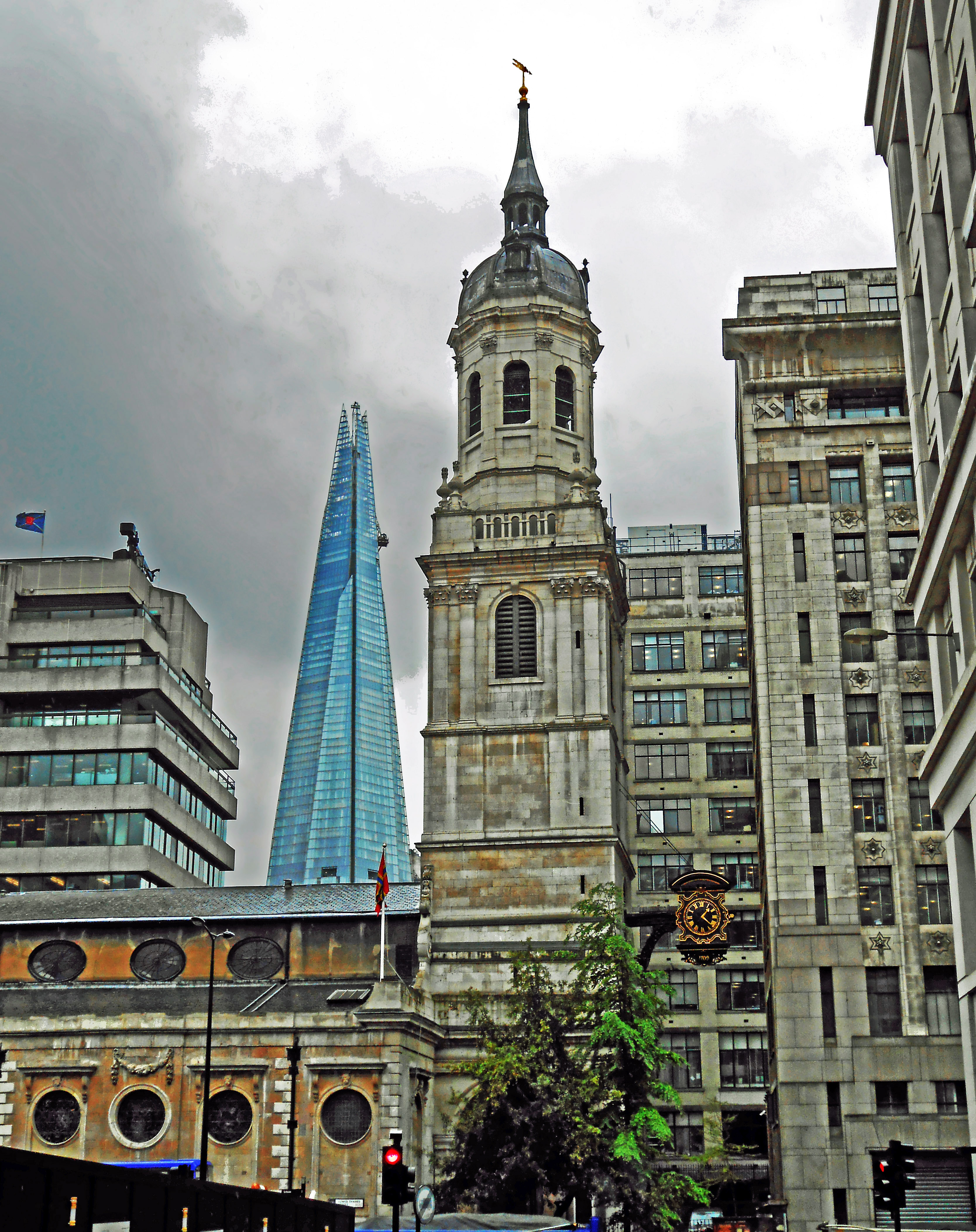
St Magnus in 2012 with The Shard in the background

In 1971 a Commission chaired by Lord Justice Buckley proposed changes to the City churches, including the creation of seven team ministries. St Magnus would have been part of a Fenchurch team along with All Hallows by the Tower, St Olave's Hart Street and St Margaret Pattens. In 1994 the Templeman Commission proposed a radical restructuring of the churches in the City Deanery. St Magnus was identified as one of the 12 churches that would remain as either a parish or an 'active' church. However, the proposals were dropped following a public outcry and the consecration of a new Bishop of London. Following the departure of Fr Michael Woodgate (Rector 1984 to 1995) the presentation to the living was suspended until 2010. The Ven Ken Gibbons was Priest-in-Charge from 1997 to 2003.

The parish priest since 2003 has been Fr Philip Warner, who was previously priest-in-charge of St Mary's Church, Belgrade (Diocese in Europe) and Apokrisiarios for the Archbishop of Canterbury to the Serbian Orthodox Church. Since January 2004 there has been an annual Blessing of the Thames, with the congregations of St Magnus and Southwark Cathedral meeting in the middle of London Bridge. On Sunday 3 July 2011, in anticipation of the feast of the translation of St Thomas Becket (7 July), a procession from St Magnus brought a relic of the saint to the middle of the bridge. On 25 May 2016, as part of a joint initiative between the Church of England and the Catholic Church of England and Wales, a relic of St Thomas Becket from Esztergom in Hungary was brought to St Magnus for veneration followed by Solemn Pontifical Vespers celebrated by the Revd Jonathan Baker, Bishop of Fulham. The Bishop of the Diocese of Szeged–Csanád, The Rt Revd László Kiss-Rigó, gave a short homily on the history of the relic.

William Petter was Director of Music from 2011 until his death in 2016, having been a founder member of the Choir of St Magnus the Martyr in 2005. His predecessor was Thomas Kennedy, and successor was Lottie Bagnall. William Johnston Davies took over in 2020, before the current Director, Edward Walters, commenced in September 2023. The choir issued CDs in 2013 (Regina Coeli) and 2014 (Inexplicable Splendour). St Magnus's organist, John Eady, has won composition competitions for new choral works at St Paul's Cathedral (a setting of Veni Sancte Spiritus first performed on 27 May 2012) and at Lincoln Cathedral (a setting of the Matin responsory for Advent first performed on 30 November 2013). Joseph Atkins composed three pieces for the church: Missa Sancti Magni, Magnificat and Nunc Dimittis and The Blessing of the Bells, a litany and antiphon for the consecration of the new bells in 2009. David Pearson composed two pieces, the Communion anthem A Mhànais mo rùin (O Magnus of my love) and a hymn to St Magnus, Nobilis, humilis, for performance at the church on the feast of St Magnus the Martyr on 16 April 2012.

In addition to liturgical music of a high standard, St Magnus has been the venue for a range of musical events. The Clemens non Papa Consort, founded in 2005, has performed in collaboration with the production team Concert Bites as a resident ensemble. The band Mishaped Pearls performed at the church on 17 December 2011. St Magnus featured in the television programme Jools Holland: London Calling, first broadcast on BBC2 on 9 June 2012. The Platinum Consort made a promotional film at St Magnus for the release of their debut album In the Dark on 2 July 2012.

The Friends of the City Churches had their office in the Vestry House of St Magnus until 2013.

== Interior ==
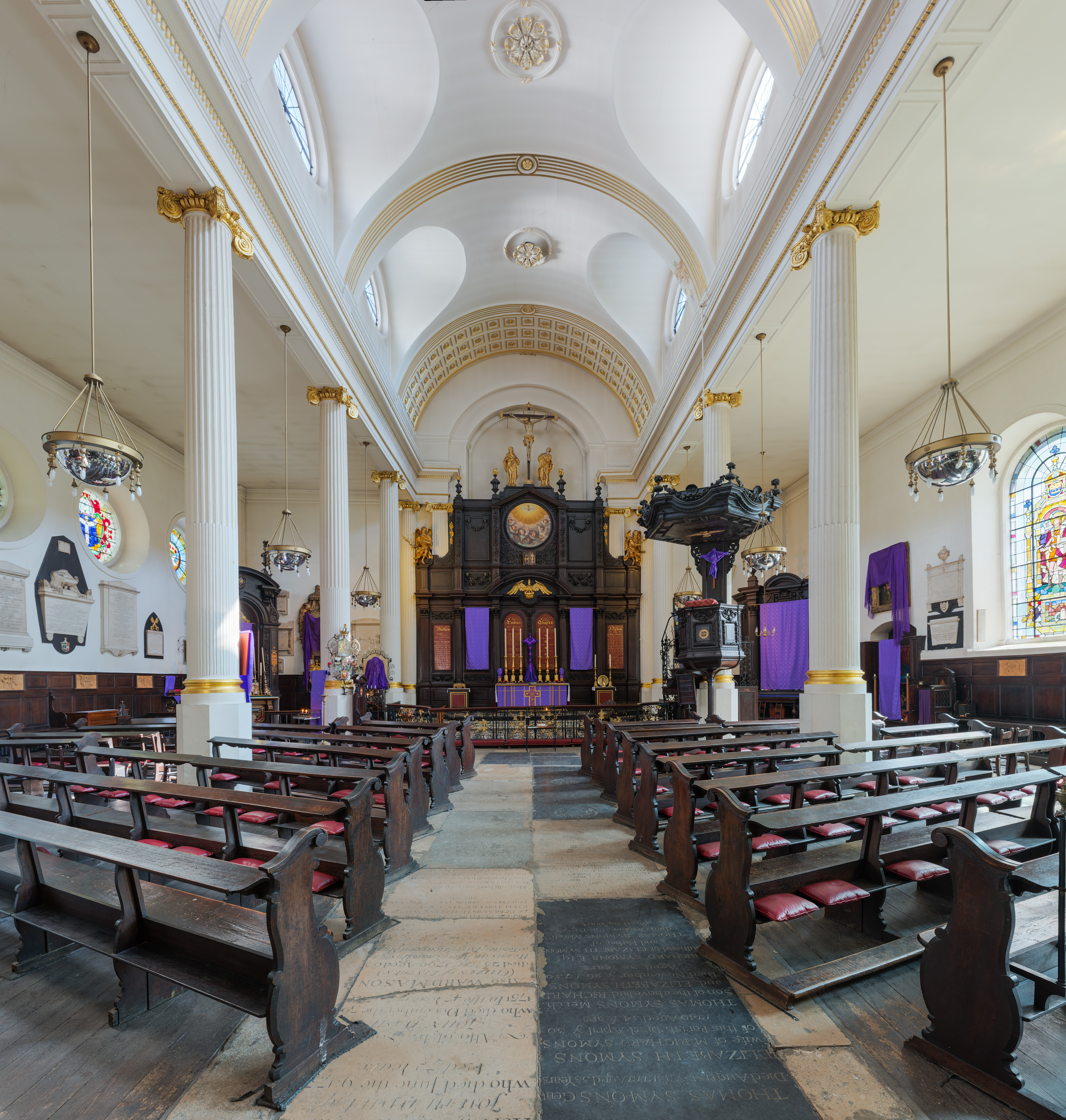
Interior of St Magnus the Martyr

Martin Travers restored the 17th century high altar reredos, including the paintings of Moses and Aaron and the Ten Commandments, and reconstructed the upper storey. Above the reredos Travers added a painted and gilded rood. In the centre of the reredos there is a carved gilded pelican (an early Christian symbol of self-sacrifice) and a Baroque-style roundel with a nimbus and dove descending, attended by cherubim. The glazed east window, which can be seen in early photographs of the church, appears to have been filled in at this time. A new altar with console tables was installed and the communion rails moved outwards to extend the size of the sanctuary. Two old door frames were used to construct side chapels and placed at an angle across the north-east and south-east corners of the church. One, the Lady Chapel, was dedicated to the Rector's parents in 1925 and the other was dedicated to Christ the King. Originally, a baroque aumbry was used for reservation of the Blessed Sacrament, but later a tabernacle was installed on the Lady Chapel altar and the aumbry was used to house a relic of the True Cross.

The interior was made to look more European by the removal of the old box pews and the installation of new pews with cut-down ends. Two new columns were inserted in the nave to make the lines regular. The Wren-period pulpit by the joiner William Grey was opened up and provided with a soundboard and crucifix. Travers also designed the statue of St Magnus of Orkney, which stands in the south aisle, and the statue of Our Lady of Walsingham.

On the north wall there is a Russian Orthodox icon, painted in 1908. The modern stations of the cross in honey-coloured Japanese oak are the work of Robert Randall and Ashley Sands. One of the windows in the north wall dates from 1671 and came from Plumbers' Hall in Chequer Yard, Bush Lane, which was demolished in 1863 to make way for Cannon Street railway station. A fireplace from the Hall was re-erected in the Vestry House. The other windows on the north side are by Alfred L. Wilkinson (1899–1983) and date from 1952 to 1960. These show the arms of the Plumbers', Fishmongers' and Coopers' Companies together with those of William Wand when Bishop of London and Geoffrey Fisher when Archbishop of Canterbury and (as noted above) the badge of the Fraternity of Our Lady de Salve Regina.

The stained glass windows in the south wall, which are by Lawrence Lee and date from 1949 to 1955, represent lost churches associated with the parish: St Magnus and his ruined church of Egilsay, St Margaret of Antioch with her lost church in New Fish Street (where the Monument to the Great Fire now stands), St Michael with his lost church of Crooked Lane (demolished to make way for the present King William Street) and St Thomas Becket with his chapel on Old London Bridge.

The church possesses a fine model of Old London Bridge. One of the tiny figures on the bridge appears out of place in the mediaeval setting, wearing a policeman's uniform. This is a representation of the model-maker, David T. Aggett, who is a Liveryman of the Worshipful Company of Plumbers and was formerly in the police service.

The Mischiefs by Fire Act 1708 and the Fires Prevention (Metropolis) Act 1774 placed a requirement on every parish to keep equipment to fight fires. The church owns two historic fire engines that belonged to the parish of St Michael, Crooked Lane. One of these is on display in the narthex of the church. The whereabouts of the other, which was misappropriated and sold at auction in 2003, is currently unknown.

In 1894 many bodies were disinterred from the crypt and reburied at the St Magnus's plot at Brookwood Cemetery, which remains the church's burial ground.

== Bells ==
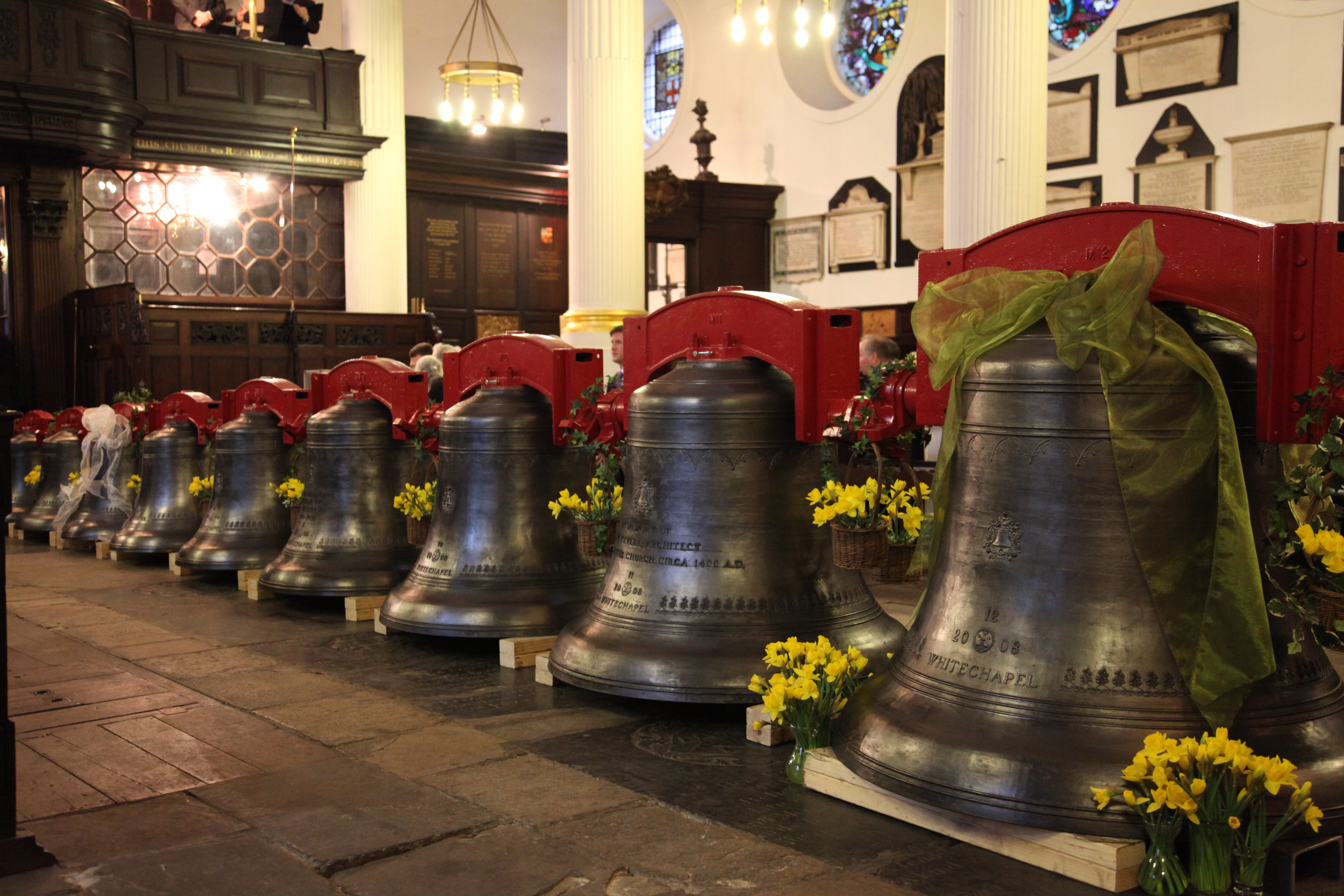
The bells in the nave ready for consecration

Prior to the Great Fire of 1666 the old tower had a ring of five bells, a small saints bell and a clock bell. 47 cwt of bell metal was recovered which suggests that the tenor was 13 or 14 cwt. The metal was used to cast three new bells, by William Eldridge of Chertsey in 1672, with a further saints bell cast that year by Hodson. In the absence of a tower, the tenor and saints bell were hung in a free standing timber structure, whilst the others remained unhung.

A new tower was completed in 1704 and it is likely that these bells were transferred to it. However, the tenor became cracked in 1713 and it was decided to replace the bells with a new ring of eight. The new bells, with a tenor of 21 cwt, were cast by Richard Phelps of the Whitechapel Bell Foundry. Between 1714 and 1718 (the exact date of which is unknown), the ring was increased to ten with the addition of two trebles given by two former ringing Societies, the Eastern Youths and the British Scholars. The first peal was rung on 15 February 1724 of Grandsire Caters by the Society of College Youths. The second bell had to be recast in 1748 by Robert Catlin, and the tenor was recast in 1831 by Thomas Mears of Whitechapel, just in time to ring for the opening of the new London Bridge. In 1843, the treble was said to be "worn out" and so was scrapped, together with the saints bell, while a new treble was cast by Thomas Mears. A new clock bell was erected in the spire in 1846, provided by B R & J Moore, who had earlier purchased it from Thomas Mears. This bell can still be seen in the tower from the street.

The 10 bells were removed for safe keeping in 1940 and stored in the churchyard. They were taken to Whitechapel Bell Foundry in 1951 whereupon it was discovered that four of them were cracked. After a long period of indecision, fuelled by lack of funds and interest, the bells were finally sold for scrap in 1976. The metal was used to cast many of the Bells of Congress that were then hung in the Old Post Office Tower in Washington, D.C.

A fund was set up on 19 September 2005, led by Dickon Love, a member of the Ancient Society of College Youths, with a view to installing a new ring of 12 bells in the tower in a new frame. This was the first of three new rings of bells he has installed in the City of London (the others being at St Dunstan-in-the-West and St James Garlickhythe). The money was raised and the bells were cast during 2008/9 by the Whitechapel Bell Foundry. The tenor weighed 26cwt 3qtr 9 lbs (1360 kg) and the new bells were designed to be in the same key as the former ring of ten. They were consecrated by the Bishop of London on 3 March 2009 in the presence of the Lord Mayor and the ringing dedicated on 26 October 2009 by the Archdeacon of London. The bells are named (in order smallest to largest) Michael, Margaret, Thomas of Canterbury, Mary, Cedd, Edward the Confessor, Dunstan, John the Baptist, Erkenwald, Paul, Mellitus and Magnus. The bells project is recorded by an inscription in the vestibule of the church.

The Flag of Orkney

The first peal on the twelve was rung on 29 November 2009 of Cambridge Surprise Maximus. Notable other recent peals include a peal of Stedman Cinques on 16 April 2011 to mark the 400th anniversary of the granting of a Royal Charter to the Plumbers' Company, a peal of Cambridge Surprise Royal on 28 June 2011 when the Fishmongers' Company gave a dinner for Prince Philip, Duke of Edinburgh at their hall on the occasion of his 90th birthday and a peal of Avon Delight Maximus on 24 July 2011 in solidarity with the people of Norway following the tragic massacre on Utoeya Island and in Oslo. On the latter occasion the flag of the Orkney Islands was flown at half mast. In 2012 peals were rung during the Thames Diamond Jubilee Pageant on 3 June and during each of the three Olympic/Paralympic marathons, on 5 and 12 August and 9 September. Following the announcement on 9 April 2021 of the death of Prince Philip, Duke of Edinburgh the tenor bell was tolled 99 times and the flag of St George was lowered to half mast.

The BBC television programme, Still Ringing After All These Years: A Short History of Bells, broadcast on 14 December 2011, included an interview at St Magnus with the Tower Keeper, Dickon Love, who was captain of the band that rang the "Royal Jubilee Bells" during the Thames Diamond Jubilee Pageant on 3 June 2012 to celebrate the Diamond Jubilee of Queen Elizabeth II. Prior to this, he taught John Barrowman to handle a bell at St Magnus for the BBC coverage.

The bells are often rung on Sundays around 12:15 (following the service) by the Guild of St Magnus.

== Livery companies and Bridge Ward ==
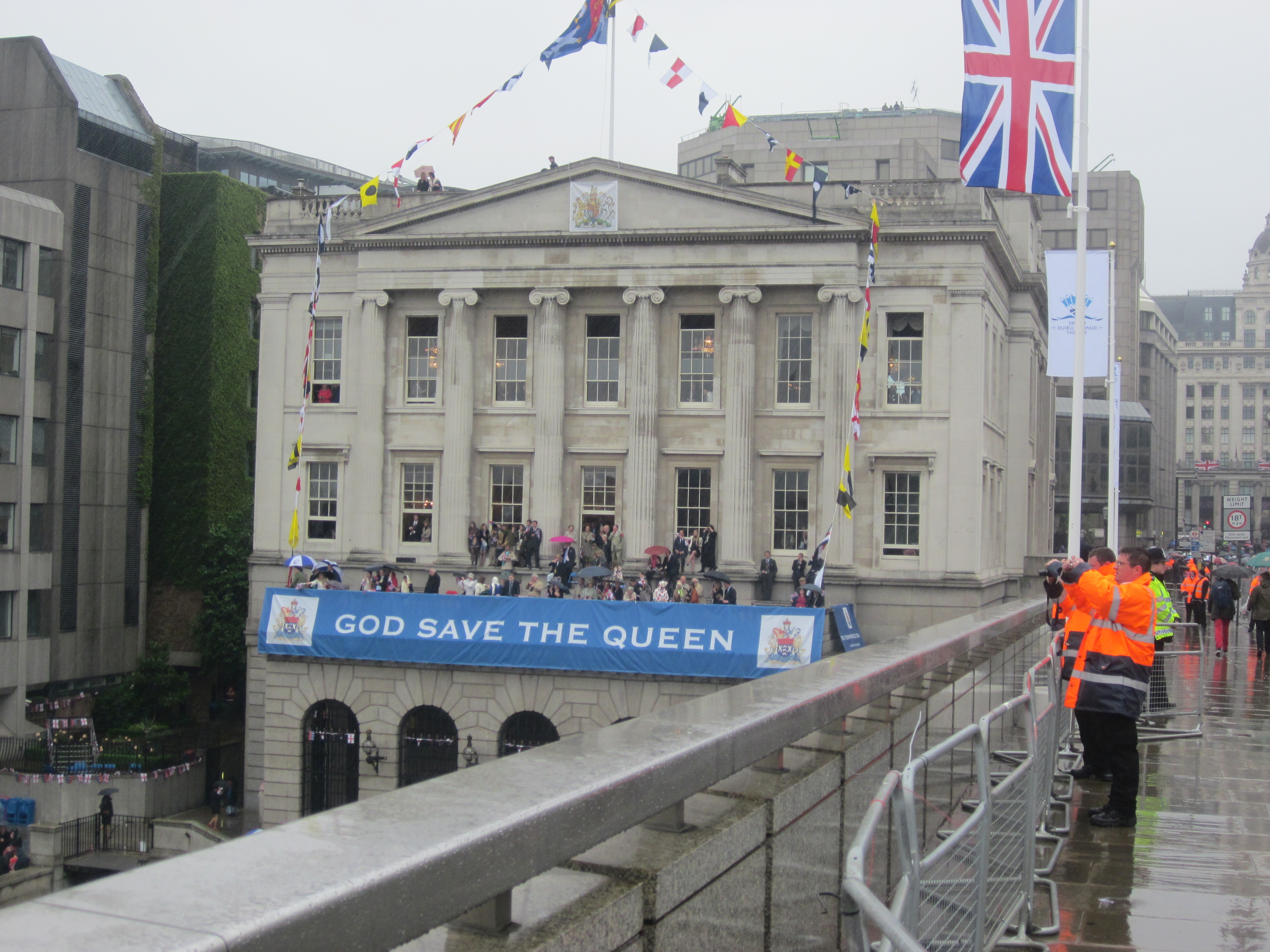
Fishmongers' Hall

St Magnus has connections with three livery companies, whose respective coats of arms are displayed in stained glass windows in the north aisle. Every other June, newly-elected wardens of the Fishmongers' Company, accompanied by the Court, proceed on foot from Fishmongers' Hall to St Magnus for an election service. St Magnus is also the Guild Church of The Plumbers' Company. Two former rectors have served as Master of the company, which holds all its services at the church. On 12 April 2011 a service was held to commemorate the 400th anniversary of the granting of the company's Royal Charter at which the Bishop of London, the Rt Revd and Rt Hon Richard Chartres KCVO, gave the sermon and blessed the original Royal Charter. The Coopers' Company hold an annual service at which the will of Henry Cloker dated 10 March 1573 is read. Cloker left property in the parish of St Michael Crooked Lane to the Company in trust for the benefit of what is now the Coopers' Company and Coborn School.

St Magnus is also the ward church for the Ward of Bridge and Bridge Without, which elects one of the city's aldermen. Between 1550 and 1978 there were separate aldermen for Bridge Within and Bridge Without, the former ward being north of the river and the latter representing the City's area of control in Southwark. The Bridge Ward Club was founded in 1930 to "promote social activities and discussion of topics of local and general interest and also to exchange ward and parochial information" and holds its annual carol service at St Magnus.

== In literature ==
Its prominent location and beauty have prompted many mentions in literature. In Oliver Twist, Charles Dickens notes how, as Nancy heads for her secret meeting with Mr Brownlow and Rose Maylie on London Bridge, "the tower of old Saint Saviour's Church, and the spire of Saint Magnus, so long the giant-warders of the ancient bridge, were visible in the gloom". The church's spiritual and architectural importance is celebrated in the poem The Waste Land by T. S. Eliot, who wrote, "the walls of Magnus Martyr hold/Inexplicable splendour of Ionian white and gold". He added in a footnote that "the interior of St. Magnus Martyr is to my mind one of the finest among Wren's interiors". One biographer of Eliot notes that at first he enjoyed St Magnus aesthetically for its "splendour"; later he appreciated its "utility" when he came there as a sinner.

== See also ==
- List of churches and cathedrals of London
- List of Christopher Wren churches in London
