= Cox and Hammond's Quay =

Wharf in London, England

Coordinates: 51.508909°N 0.085551°W

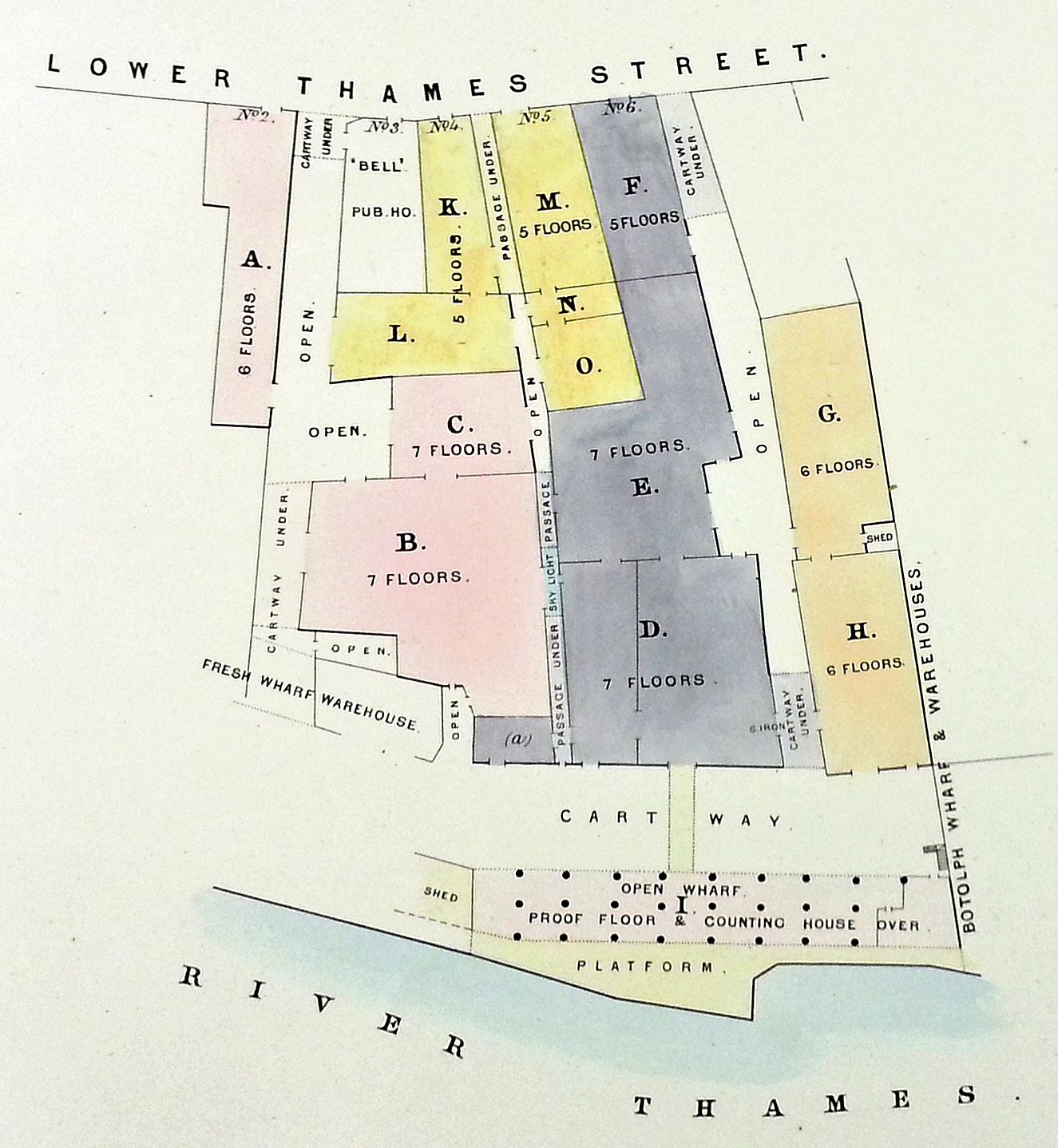
1857 map showing Cox's Quay (in grey; D, E, F) and Hammond's Quay (in orange; G, H). The wharf, marked I, served both sets of warehouses

Cox & Hammond's Quay was a wharf located in the City of London, on the north bank of the River Thames a short distance downstream from London Bridge. It was originally two separate quays, Cox's Quay (also known as Cox's Key or Cock's Key) and Hammond's Quay, separated by Gaunt's Quay. On the landward side, the wharf was accessed via Lower Thames Street just behind the site of the church of St Botolph Billingsgate.

== Origins ==
The wharf encompassed three of the twenty Legal Quays of the City of London, designated in the Act of Frauds of 1559. They were given state authorisation to serve as official landing and loading points for traders. Cox's Quay was designated as being "altogether for foreigners' goods who had merchandizes and lodgings" and Gaunt's Quay was "for landing of barrell fyshe and suche like havinge no crane". The three quays already existed at that time, though the date of their establishments is not known. They were among the smallest of the legal quays and had a combined frontage of only 119 ft (36 m) – 54 ft (16 m) for Cox's Quay, 31 ft (9.4 m) for Gaunt's Quay and 23 ft (7.0 m) for Hammond's Quay.

All three quays appear to have been named after owners; during the reign of Elizabeth I of England, Cox's Quay was recorded as having been demised from Richard Coke to Anne Cooke, either of which could have been the source of the quay's name. Gaunt's Quay was at some point absorbed into Hammond's Quay, and Cox and Hammond's Quays were both subsequently united. The 18th century ownership of Gaunt's and Cox's Quays was somewhat unusual in that they were both owned and managed by a professional lighterman. Hammond's Quay was owned for several centuries by the Vintners' Company, to which it had been bequeathed in 1439 by Thomas Crofton. He transferred his responsibilities as a trustee to the Company in exchange for an agreement that it would celebrate a service for the dead or dirige annually on 3 May at St Botolph Billingsgate. In 1792 the Company attempted to offer the lease to the East India Company, which declined. Another man obtained the lease but in turn reassigned it to the East India Company in 1796.

== 19th and 20th centuries ==
The two quays were bought out by the Treasury in 1805 for a cost of nearly £43,000 (equivalent to £4,408,000 today). In 1836 the wharfinger John Knill, who owned Fresh Wharf immediately to the north, took over Cox's and Hammond's Quay as a tenant. He had a new warehouse constructed over Cox's Quay in 1842. Knill occupied five of the warehouses at Cox & Hammond's Quay in 1857, using them for fruit and non-hazardous goods, with eight more warehouses occupied by other tenants. They were described as all being of brick and in good repair, "age considered". In 1869 it was reported that the wharf was to undergo rebuilding and unification with the neighbouring Botolph Wharf. John Knill & Company (subsequently the Fresh Wharf Company) purchased the wharf outright in 1876.

In the 1930s, the Fresh Wharf Company leased the whole of the river frontage from Cox and Hammond's Quay to London Bridge Wharf. The warehouses of Fresh Wharf and Cox and Hammond's Quay were damaged during the Second World War by a V-1 flying bomb strike that demolished the nearby Nicholson's Wharf. They were replaced in 1953 with a ten-storey warehouse constructed as part of the expanded New Fresh Wharf, with four million cubic feet of storage space. This only lasted twenty years; with the collapse in traffic to the London docks that followed the advent of containerization the wharf was made redundant and was demolished in 1973. It was eventually replaced by St Magnus House, an office building designed by Richard Seifert that was constructed in 1978. The site of the old quayside is now part of the Thames Path.
