= Frances G. Wickes =

American psychologist and writer of children's fiction

Frances Gillespy Wickes
- Born: Frances Gillespy; 28 August 1875; Lansingburgh, New York, United States
- Died: 5 May 1967 (aged 91); Peterborough, New Hampshire, United States
- Citizenship: American
- Education: Teachers College, Columbia University
- Scientific career
- Fields: Psychology, psychotherapy, analytical psychology Non-fiction / fiction author, especially juvenile short fiction

Frances Wickes (born Frances Gillespy, Lansingburgh, New York, August 28, 1875 – Peterborough, New Hampshire, May 5, 1967) was a psychologist and writer.

== Biography ==
A graduate of Teachers College, Wickes was a teacher, writer, and playwright for children and teenagers in New York City, but later became interested in becoming a Jungian therapist, especially for artists, and visited Zurich several times after meeting Carl Jung in 1920s, with whom Wickes maintained a correspondence.

Wickes kept a diary of dreams and made conferences, especially at the Analytical Psychology Club of New York. Wickes had a husband, Thomas Wickes (divorced in 1910 and died about 1947) and a son, Eliphalet Wickes (1906–1926). Wickes lived also in California and Alaska.

Jung wrote the preface to her second book on the psychological world of children (1927), where Wickes supported the autonomous presence of the child in the collective unconscious, according to the idea of a participation mystique, which Lucien Lévy-Bruhl in 1910 had theorized to exist within primitive societies, Wickes's comparing a child to an individual in training and giving more place to intuition and feeling than attention to the real or rational. The book was translated into German, French, Dutch, Italian, and Greek.

In coming decades, Wickes helped found Spring, which bills itself as the oldest Jungian journal, and lectured at various branches of the Jung Institutes.

Among Wickes's correspondents are preserved letters to Muriel Rukeyser (1913–1980), Henry Murray, Eudora Welty, Mary Louise Peebles (1833–1915), Martha Graham, Lewis Mumford, Thomas Mann, May Sarton, Robert Edmond Jones (1887–1954), and William McGuire (1917–2009). At death without heirs, $1–1/2 million of her $2-million estate were given to the C. G. Jung Institute of San Francisco and the rest to the Frances G. Wickes Foundation (1955–1974).

== Works ==
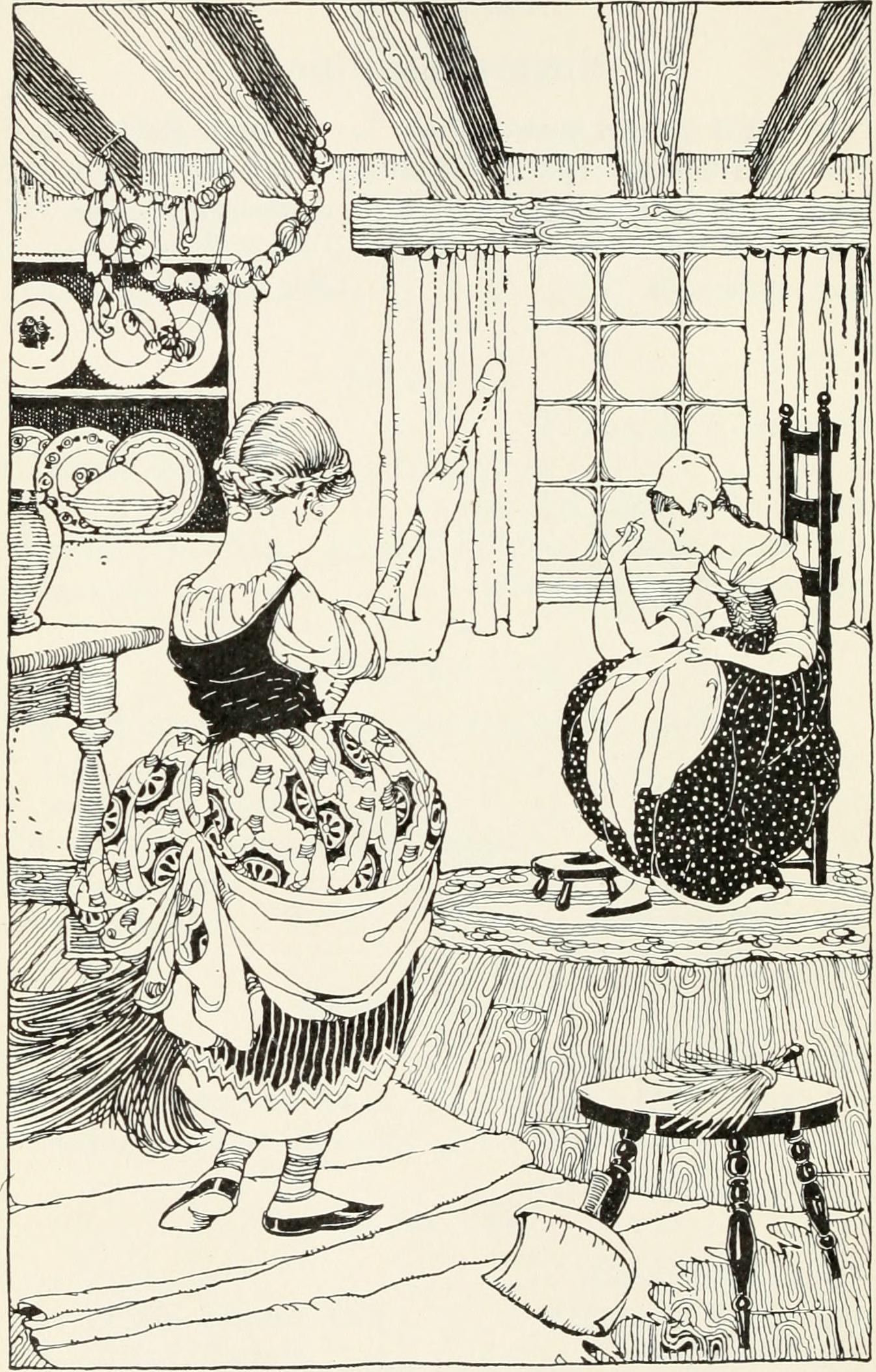
Gertrude A. Kay illustration for Happy Holidays, 1921

=== Non-fiction ===
- The Inner World of Childhood: A Study in Analytical Psychology, 1927; (with a preface Carl Jung) New York: D. Appleton and Co., 1931 OCLC 504349
- The Inner World of Man, with Psychological Drawings and Paintings. New York: Farrar & Rinehart, 1938 OCLC 1248771
- The Inner World of Choice. New York: Harper and Row, 1963 ISBN 9780938434351

=== Shorter pieces and fiction ===
- Stories to Act, 1915 ISBN 9781332830329
- "The Christmas Jest," A Child's Book of Holiday Plays, 1916 OCLC 697661056
- Child's Own Book of Verse, Vol. 1 and 2, 1917 (anthology of children's poetry compiled with Ada Maria Skinner)
- Happy Holidays, illustrated by Gertrude A. Kay, 1921
- Beyond the Rainbow Bridge, 1924
- A New Garden of Verses for Children, 1925 (ed. by Wickes) by Wilhelmina Seegmiller
- "Mother Spider," in A Child's Book of Country Stories, Ada M. Skinner and Eleanor L. Skinner (eds), 1925
- "A Question," in Spring, 1941, pp. 107–109
- Receive the Gale. A Novel. New York: D. Appleton-Century, 1946
- "The Creative Process," in Spring, 1948, pp. 26–46
- "The Conjure Wives" (link to audio), Stories to Dramatize, Winifred Ward (eds), Stories to Dramatize, 1952
- Arrow Book of Ghost Stories, Nora Kramer (eds), 1960
- "Wait Till Martin Comes In," Wilhelmina Harper (eds), Ghosts and Goblins: Halloween Stories for 1965

== Sources ==
- "Frances G. Wickes, 91, Author Of Psychology Books, Is Dead". The New York Times. 8 May 1967. p. 41.
- Mary Esther Harding, "Obituary – Wickes, F.G." Journal of Analytical Psychology, XIII, 1, January 1968, pp. 67–69.
- Vincent Brome, Jung: Man and Myth, House of Stratus, 2001
- Deirdre Bair, Jung. A Biography, Boston: Little, Brown and Co., 2003.
- "Frances G. Wickes Papers: A Finding Aid to the Collection in the Library of Congress", pg. 1, Pg. 2
