= Legal Quays =

Customs Act 1558
- Act of Parliament
- Parliament of England
- Long title: An Act limiting the time for laying on land merchandizes from beyond the seas, and touching customs for sweet wines.
- Citation: 1 Eliz. 1. c. 11
- Territorial extent: England and Wales

Dates
- Royal assent: 8 May 1559
- Commencement: 1 September 1559 (Note: Section 1.)
- Repealed: 5 July 1825
Other legislation
Amended by	Repeal of Acts Concerning Importation Act 1822
Repealed by	Customs Law Repeal Act 1825
Relates to	Forestallers Act 1551

Status: Repealed

Text of statute as originally enacted

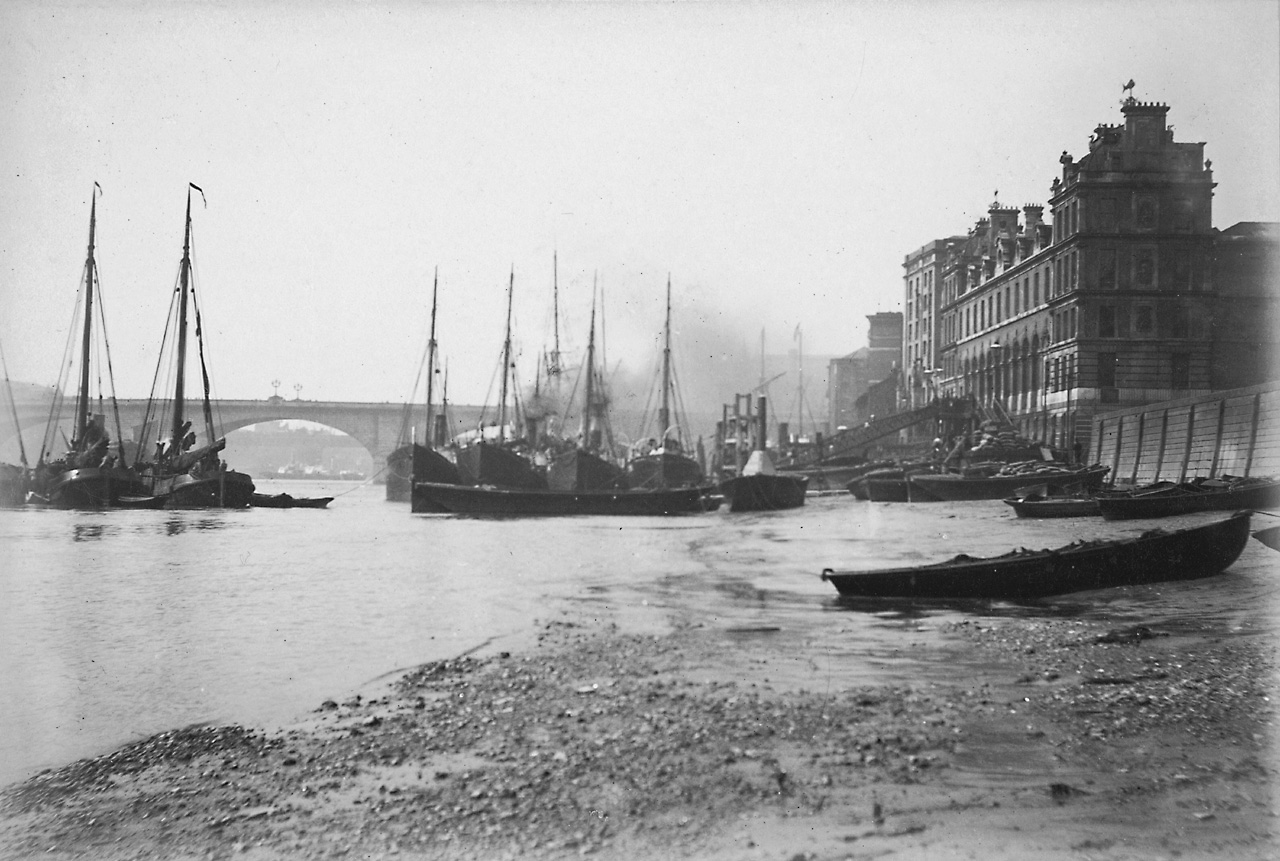
Ships moored off the Legal Quays around Billingsgate Wharf in 1886

Customs Act 1662
- Act of Parliament
- Parliament of England
- Long title: An Act for preventing Frauds and regulating Abuses in His Majesties Customes.
- Citation: 14 Cha. 2. c. 11 (Note: This is the citation in The Statutes of the Realm.); 13 & 14 Cha. 2. c. 11 (Note: This is the chapter in The Statutes at Large.)
- Territorial extent: England and Wales

Dates
- Royal assent: 19 May 1662
- Commencement: 7 January 1662 (Note: Start of session.)
- Repealed: 5 July 1825
Other legislation
Repealed by	Customs Law Repeal Act 1825

Status: Repealed

Text of statute as originally enacted

The Legal Quays of England were created by the Act of Frauds or Customs Act 1558 (1 Eliz. 1. c. 11), an act of the Parliament of the United Kingdom enacted in 1559 during the reign of Elizabeth I of England. It established new rules for customs in England in order to boost the Crown's finances. One of its most important provisions was the establishment of a rule that it was illegal to land or load goods anywhere other than authorised Legal Quays in London and other ports, under the supervision of customs officers. The legislation also set out which towns were authorised to act as ports.

== Origins ==
The act was enacted largely at the instigation of Sir William Paulet, 1st Marquess of Winchester and long-serving Lord Treasurer. It established the Legal Quays and appointed commissioners to designate such quays at every port in the realm. At the most important port by far, London, Paulet himself was appointed along with Sir Richard Sackville and Sir Walter Mildmay, the Under-Treasurer and Chancellor of the Exchequer respectively, to undertake "the limitation, assigning and appointing of all the quays and wharves and places appertaining and belonging to the Port of London for the loading and lauding, discharging, unloading and laying on land thereof wares and merchandises". Their role consisted of surveying London's wharves and quays to recommend which should be designated as Legal Quays.

== Legal Quays in London ==
Port of London (Legal Quays) Act 1846
- Act of Parliament
- Parliament of the United Kingdom
- Long title: An Act for the Regulation of the Legal Quays within the Port of London.
- Citation: 9 & 10 Vict. c. cccxcix
- Territorial extent: United Kingdom

Dates
- Royal assent: 26 August 1846
- Commencement: 26 August 1846 (Note: The Acts of Parliament (Commencement) Act 1793.)
- Expired: 1 October 1847 (Note: Section 9.)
- Repealed: 5 November 1993
Other legislation
Amended by	Port of London (Legal Quays) Act 1846 Continuance Act 1847
Repealed by	Statute Law (Repeals) Act 1993
Relates to	Customs Act 1558; Customs Act 1662

Status: Repealed

Text of statute as originally enacted

Port of London (Legal Quays) Act 1846 Continuance Act 1847
- Act of Parliament
- Parliament of the United Kingdom
- Long title: An Act for making perpetual the Provisions of an Act passed in the last Session of Parliament, intituled "An Act for the Regulation of the Legal Quays within the Port of London."
- Citation: 10 & 11 Vict. c. cc
- Territorial extent: United Kingdom

Dates
- Royal assent: 9 July 1847
- Commencement: 9 July 1847
- Repealed: 5 November 1993
Other legislation
Amends	Port of London (Legal Quays) Act 1846
Repealed by	Statute Law (Repeals) Act 1993

Status: Repealed

Text of statute as originally enacted

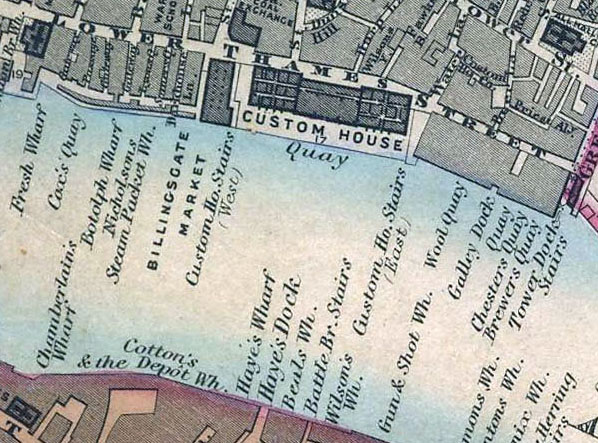
Map of London's Legal Quays (on the north bank) in 1862

Although many quays already existed along the Thames shoreline, Paulet, Sackville and Mildmay decreed that "all creeks, wharves, quays, loading and discharging places" in Gravesend, Woolwich, Barking, Greenwich, Deptford, Blackwall, Limehouse, Ratcliff, Wapping, St Katherine's, Tower Hill, Rotherhithe, Southwark and London Bridge should be "no more used as loading or discharging places for merchandise". Twenty existing quays with a frontage of 1,419 ft (433 m), all located on the north bank of the Thames between London Bridge and the Tower of London, were designated as Legal Quays. In order of their position between London Bridge and the Tower of London, they were:

1. Fresh Wharf
2. Cox's Quay
3. Gaunt's Quay
4. Hammond's Quay
5. Botolph Wharf
6. Lyon's Quay
7. Somer's Quay
8. Smart's Quay
9. Dice Quay
10. Ralph's Quay
11. Young's Quay
12. Wiggin's Quay
13. Sable's Quay
14. Bear Quay
15. Porter's Quay
16. Custom House Quay
17. Wool Quay
18. Galley Quay
19. Chester Quay
20. Brewster's Quay

To cope with the volume and complexity of trade in London, particular quays were required to specialise in particular cargoes. For instance, Bear and Young's Quays were reserved for trade with Portugal, due to the presence nearby of warehouses used by Portuguese merchants; other wharves were reserved for the import and export of commodities such as fish, corn, woollen cloths, oil and wine. They were privately owned and operated as a de facto monopoly. During the Great Fire of London in September 1666, which started a short distance to the north in Pudding Lane, all of the Legal Quays were destroyed. They were quickly rebuilt and were all back in operation by the mid-1670s.

== Expansion ==
Port of London (Public Sufferance Wharves) Act 1848
- Act of Parliament
- Parliament of the United Kingdom
- Long title: An Act for the Regulation of certain public Sufferance Wharves in the Port of London.
- Citation: 11 & 12 Vict. c. xviii
- Territorial extent: United Kingdom

Dates
- Royal assent: 9 June 1848
- Commencement: 9 June 1848
- Repealed: 5 November 1993
Other legislation
Repealed by	Statute Law (Repeals) Act 1993

Status: Repealed

Text of statute as originally enacted

Sufferance Wharves (Port of London) Act 1858
- Act of Parliament
- Parliament of the United Kingdom
- Long title: An Act for the Regulation of certain Public Sufferance Wharves in the Port of London.
- Citation: 21 & 22 Vict. c. xli
- Territorial extent: United Kingdom

Dates
- Royal assent: 14 June 1858
- Commencement: 14 June 1858
- Repealed: 5 November 1993
Other legislation
Repealed by	Statute Law (Repeals) Act 1993

Status: Repealed

The regime set out in the Customs Act 1558 lasted into the 18th century. Seventy-four English towns were eventually designated as ports and authorised Legal Quays were established within them. However, this system proved too limited to cope with the demand in the Port of London and further wharves, known as "public sufferance wharves", were established under an order of the Commissioners of Her Majesty's Customs, on the 13 May 1789. Most were located on the south bank of the Thames. They were used to land low-duty goods, but with no expansion in the list of ports or Legal Quays, or increases to the size of the quays themselves, quay space was constantly in short supply and was not remotely adequate for the demands of increasing levels of trade.

By way of illustration, by 1800 around 1,775 vessels had to moor in a space with capacity for only 545. The legal quays had not added any more frontage since 1666 and warehouse space was very limited. Congestion and delays were constant and chronic, with most vessels forced to unload while moored in the river rather than being able to moor alongside a quay. The long delays and lack of security led to widespread problems with theft and pilferage. The issue was eventually addressed with the construction of enclosed docks to the east of the City, notably on the Isle of Dogs and in Wapping, Blackwall and Rotherhithe, each with their own Legal Quays and secure bonded warehouses. The Customs Consolidation Act 1853 (16 & 17 Vict. c. 107) allowed Legal Quays and bonded warehouses to be built outside the docks, and by 1866, nearly 120 riverside wharves had obtained these privileges.
