= Sarah Addington =

Children's book author and journalist

- Born: 1891
- Died: 1940 (aged 48–49); New York City, U.S.
- Education: Earlham College; Columbia University
- Spouse: Howard Reid
- Writing career
- Genre: Children's literature

Sarah Addington (1891–1940) was an author of children's books and a newspaper journalist.

== Early life ==
Addington was born in 1891. She received a Bachelor of Arts degree from Earlham College in Richmond, Indiana in 1912. She then studied at Columbia University. She married Howard Carl Reid in 1917.

== Later life ==
During her later life, she made her home in New York City. She died there on November 7, 1940.

== Selected works ==
The Boy who Lived in Pudding Lane

- The Boy Who Lived in Pudding Lane: Being a True Account, If Only You Believe It, of the Life and Ways of Santa, Oldest Son of Mr. & Mrs. Claus. Boston: Atlantic Monthly Press, 1922.
- Pied Piper of Pudding Lane. Illustrated by Gertrude A. Kay. Boston: Atlantic Monthly Press, 1923. OCLC 17400199
- Round the Year in Pudding Lane. Illustrated by Gertrude Alice Kay. Boston: Little, Brown, and Company, 1924. OCLC 6579353
- Pudding Lane People. Illustrated by Janet Laura Scott. Boston: Little Brown & Company, 1926. OCLC 11418973
- Jerry Juddkins. 1926.
- Tommy Tingle Tangle. Illustrated by Gertrude Alice Kay. Joliet: P. F. Volland Company, 1927.
- Grammar Town. Illustrated by Gertrude Alice Kay. Philadelphia: David McKay Co., 1927. OCLC 19714125
- Dance Team. New York: D. Appleton, 1931. OCLC 23761728
- Hound of Heaven. New York: D. Appleton-Century Co., 1935. OCLC 3711445
