= Brinton Turkle =

American children's book illustrator (born 1915)

Brinton Cassady Turkle (August 15, 1915 – October 9, 2003) was an author and illustrator of children's books including Thy Friend, Obadiah, a 1970 Caldecott Honor title. In addition to his books as both author and illustrator, Turkle illustrated as many as 100 titles for other authors. His work is known for its rich, colorful details and Quaker themes.

== Early life and career ==
Turkle was born on August 15, 1915, in Alliance, Ohio. Growing up, he frequently visited the art studio of Gertude Alice Kay, a prominent children's book illustrator who was a friend of his mother. Though Turkle was interested in the theatre, he pursued a career in the advertising industry. Turkle attended Carnegie Institute of Technology (1933 – 1936), the School of the Museum of Fine Arts at Tufts (1938 – 1940), and the Institute of Design in Chicago. In 1948, he married Yvonne Foulston, and the couple moved to Santa Fe, New Mexico, where they began raising their family of three children. Turkle began to illustrate children's books, and eventually moved to New York City in 1959 to further pursue children's literature.

In 1965, at the encouragement of his friend, Ezra Jack Keats, Turkle submitted the manuscript of his first children's book, Obadiah the Bold, in which the title character wishes to be a pirate, but learns from his father what true bravery means. Over the course of his career, Turkle went on to illustrate 82 children's books, including Thy Friend, Obadiah, in which the title character is befriended by a seagull who initially annoys the boy, but eventually teaches him a lesson about loyalty and humility. The book won a 1970 Caldecott Honor. Turkle's work often incorporates Quaker values and the theme of place. Turkle's books, namely the Obadiah series, have been embraced by the Quaker community. Among Turkle's books is a series of Obadiah titles, which cover a Quaker family living on the island of Nantucket during the colonial period. Turkle also illustrated a wordless adaption of the Goldilocks story, called Deep in the Forest, in 1976.

== Beliefs, later life, and death ==
Turkle felt that his works differed from "the hypocrisy, materialism and brutality that so pervade our society. As my readers leave childhood behind, I hope that they will carry with them an appreciation for such alternatives as integrity, mutual respect, kindness and reverence for life. These alternatives are in my books and I pray that exposure to them will play a part in the construction of a better tomorrow."

In the 1970s, Turkle returned to New Mexico and became active in Quaker society there. The State of New Mexico honored him as a "New Mexico Living Treasure" and gave him the Governor's Award for Excellence in the Arts. He has been described as the most successful Quaker to write and illustrate children's literature.

On October 9, 2003, Turkle died at age 88. A collection of his work is held at the University of Connecticut Libraries. In 2016, Turkle work was featured in an exhibit at the Eric Carle Museum of Picture Book Art.

== Bibliography ==
Some of Brinton Turkle's books include:

=== As author and illustrator ===
- Obadiah the Bold, Viking, 1965.
- The Magic of Millicent Musgrave, Viking, 1967.
- The Fiddler of High Lonesome, Viking, 1968.
- Thy Friend, Obadiah, Viking, 1969.
- The Sky Dog, Viking, 1969.
- Mooncoin Castle, Viking, 1970.
- The Adventures of Obadiah, Viking, 1972.
- It's Only Arnold, Viking, 1973.
- Deep in the Forest, Dutton, 1976.
- Rachel and Obadiah, Dutton, 1978.
- Do Not Open, Dutton, 1981.

=== As illustrator ===
- Ann McGovern. If You Lived in Colonial Times, Four Winds, 1964.
- Eve Merriam. The Story of Ben Franklin, Four Winds, 1965.
- Bettye Hill Braucher. Belinda and Me, Viking, 1966.
- Ann McGovern. If You Grew Up with Abraham Lincoln, Four Winds, 1966.
- Ruth A. Sonneborn. The Lollipop Party, Viking, 1967.
- F. P. Heide and S. W. Van Clief. That's What Friends Are For, Four Winds, 1968.
- Peggy Parish. Granny and the Indians, Macmillan, 1969.
- Tamara Kitt. Jake, Abelard-Schuman, 1969.
- Beatrice Schenk De Regniers. Catch a Little Fox, Seabury, 1970.
- F. N. Monjo. Poor Richard in France, Holt, 1973.
- Lydia Marie Child. Over the River and Through the Wood, Coward, 1974.
- Freya Littledale. The Elves and the Shoemaker, Scholastic Book Services, 1975.
- Bette Lamont. Island Time, Lippincott, 1976.
- Lucille Clifton. The Boy Who Didn't Believe in Spring, 1988..
- Media Adaptations: Rachel and Obadiah was made into a filmstrip in 1982 by Live Oak Media, Somers, New York.
