= Pudding Lane =

Street in the City of London

Coordinates: 51.5102°N 0.0853°W

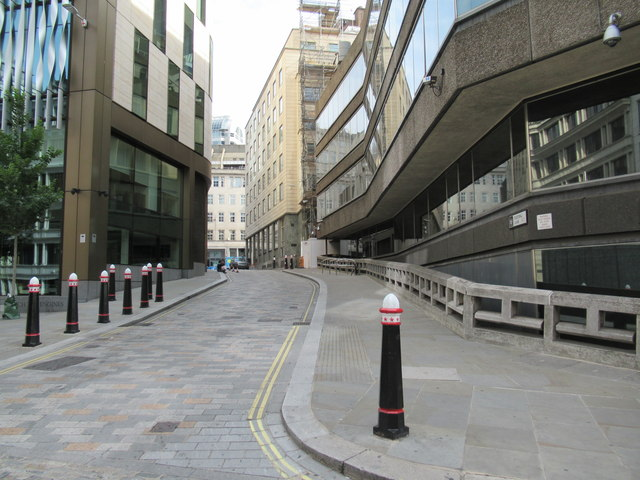
- Interactive map of Pudding Lane
- Location: London, England
- Postal code: EC3
- North end: Eastcheap
- South end: Pedestrianised to Lower Thames Street

Other
- Known for: Origin of the Great Fire of London

Pudding Lane is a small street in London, widely known as the location of Thomas Farriner's bakery, where the Great Fire of London started in 1666. It runs between Eastcheap and Thames Street in the historic City of London, and intersects Monument Street, the site of Christopher Wren's Monument to the Great Fire.

Farriner's bakery stood immediately opposite the location of the present Monument, on the eastern side of Pudding Lane. The site was paved over when Monument Street was built in 1886–87, but is marked by a plaque on the wall of nearby Faryners House, placed there by the Bakers' Company in 1986.

Pudding Lane was given its name by the butchers of Eastcheap Market, who used it to transport "pudding" or offal down to the river to be taken away by waste barges. There was a wharf at its lower end called Rothersgate (from the "rothers" or cattle that were landed there), and it was also known as Rother Lane. Another name for it was Red Rose Lane, from a shop sign that once hung in it.

Pudding Lane was one of the world's first one-way streets. An order restricting cart traffic to one-way travel on Pudding Lane and 16 other lanes around Thames Street was issued in 1617, an idea not copied until Albemarle Street became a one-way street in 1800.

The nearest Underground stations to Pudding Lane are Bank and Monument stations, a short distance to the west. The closest main-line railway stations are Fenchurch Street and Cannon Street.

== In popular culture ==
Tom Canty, the protagonist of Mark Twain's The Prince and the Pauper, lives on Pudding Lane.

Sara Addington wrote several children's books referring to the lane:

- The Boy Who Lived in Pudding Lane. Illustrated by Gertrude Alice Kay. Boston: Atlantic Monthly Press, 1922.
- Pied Piper of Pudding Lane. Illustrated by Gertrude Alice Kay. Boston: Atlantic Monthly Press, 1923. OCLC 17400199
- Round the Year in Pudding Lane. Illustrated by Gertrude Alice Kay. Boston: Little, Brown, and Company, 1924. OCLC 6579353
- Pudding Lane People. Illustrated by Janet Laura Scott. Boston: Little, Brown, and Company, 1926. OCLC 11418973

Pudding Lane and Farriner's bakery feature prominently in the 2016 musical show Bumblescratch.

In the 1982 Doctor Who episode "The Visitation", alien weapons intensify a fire that starts when the Doctor drops a torch in Pudding Lane, and spreads to become the Great Fire.

== Bibliography ==
- Collins, Amy (2016). "Pudding Lane". Map of Early Modern London. University of Victoria.
