= Gertrude Alice Kay =

American children's book illustrator and author

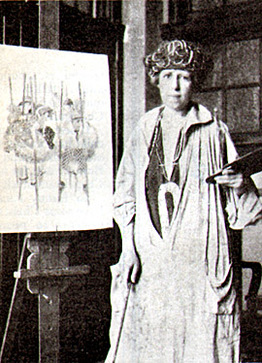
- Gertrude and the May 1924 cover of Ladies' Home Journal
- Born: January 30, 1884; Alliance, Ohio, United States
- Died: December 17, 1939 (aged 55); Youngstown, Ohio, United States
- Resting place: Alliance City Cemetery; 40.9323°N 81.1128°W
- Education: Alliance High School; Philadelphia School of Design for Women; Drexel University; Pennsylvania Academy of the Fine Arts
- Known for: Children's literature and illustration
- Movement: Golden Age of Illustration

Gertrude Alice Kay (January 30, 1884 – December 17, 1939) was an American children's literature illustrator and author best known for her work in fairy tales and beginner novels. She was active during America's Golden Age of Illustration.

== Biography ==
Gertrude Alice Kay was born on January 30, 1884, in Alliance, Ohio. She was the second of three daughters born to Charles Young Kay and Gertrude Cantine Kay, named after her mother. Her older sister Mary was born two years prior in 1882, but her younger sister Carolyn wouldn't be born until 1900. Her father was a hardware salesman who supported his daughter's creativity, encouraging her to secure an arts education.

Gertrude moved to Philadelphia after graduating from Alliance High School in 1902. She attended the Philadelphia School of Design for Women and Drexel University before officially graduating from the Pennsylvania Academy of the Fine Arts. While at Drexel University she studied under Howard Pyle for several years, alongside many other prominent female illustrators including Jessie Wilcox Smith, Elizabeth Shippen Green, and Violet Oakley.

At different points throughout her life, she was a member of organizations such as The Plastic Club of Philadelphia, the Association of Women Painters and Sculptors of New York, and the Authors' League of America. As an early member of The Plastic Club, Gertrude participated in an early women's only art space that called for "art for art's sake."

After graduating from Pennsylvania Academy of the Fine Arts, Gertrude established an art studio in her hometown of Alliance, Ohio where she remained for the rest of her life. After an artistic career that spanned three decades, Gertrude Alice Kay died in a car accident in Youngstown, Ohio on December 17, 1939. She was 55.

== Career ==
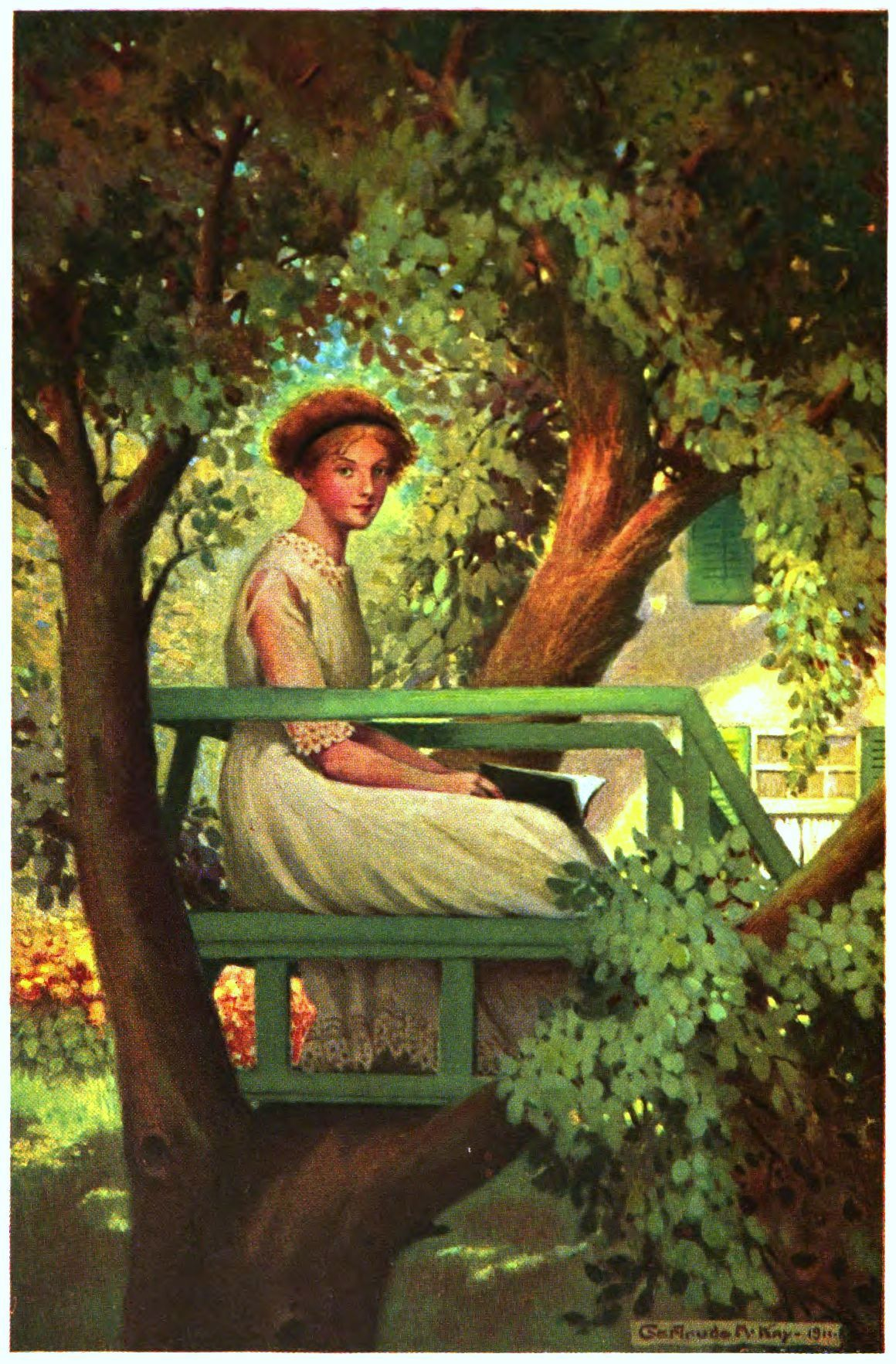
The House in the Hedge (frontispiece), 1911.

Beginning in 1906, Gertrude regularly exhibited her work at the Pennsylvania Academy of the Fine Arts in Philadelphia. She began her career illustrating children's books with Down Spider Web Lane, A Fairy Tale, written by Mary Dickerson Donahey in 1909. Kay illustrated two more books before publishing her first original children's book in 1916: another book for Donahey, Through the Little Green Door, and The House in the Hedge by Ralph Henry Barbour.

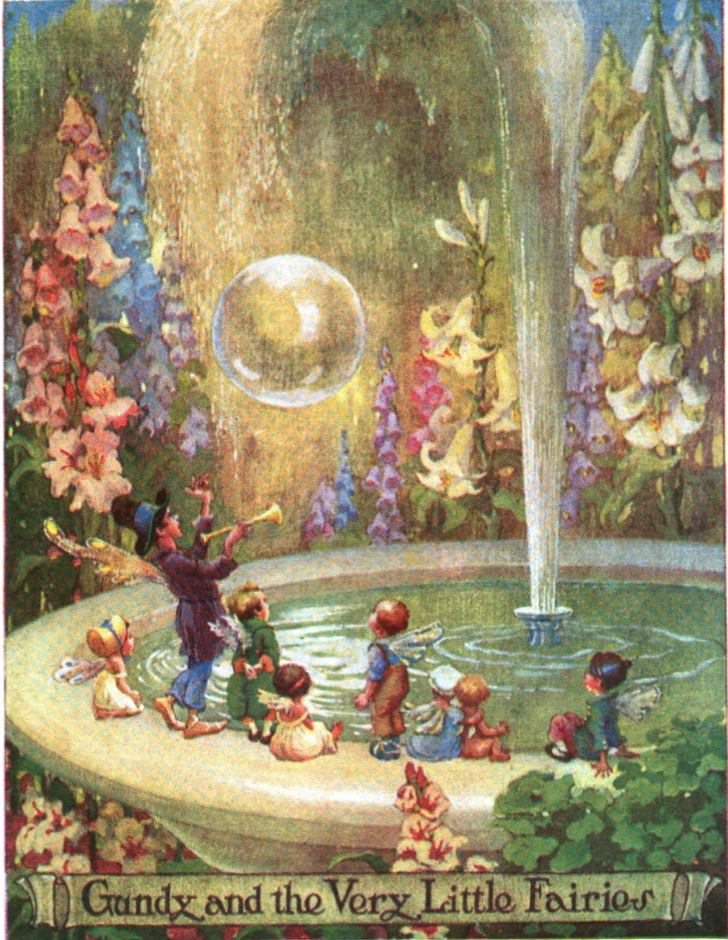
The Fairy Who Believed in Human Beings, 1918.

Books illustrated by Kay regularly appeared in catalogs and review publications. An article published in The Literary Digest magazine on December 7, 1918, titled "The Year's Best Twenty-Five Holiday Books for Children" included a glowing review of Kay's original children's book The Fairy Who Believed in Human Beings.

"'Do you believe in humans?' is here the question, instead of Peter Pan's appeal. Little Gundy is a fairy born in an ash-heap. His career is charmingly told, both in text and pictures. Ironical in places - following Mrs. Burnett's style in The Cozy Lion and Racketty-Packetty House - the story is full of fun and fairy quality. It is just the kind of story to be read aloud during the children's hour in every household - if there is such a thing as the children's hour in these up-to-date times."

In the early 1920s, Gertrude began traveling the world with her mother and sister, Mary. They spent a significant amount of time overseas, traveling through China, Japan, Ireland, England, Italy, and more. This period of time was significantly influential on Kay's art, which was later praised for its ability to accurately and sensitively portray a wide variety of cultures and ethnicities. In 1930 she collected her work from this time and published the children's book Adventures in Geography. Adventures in Geography is a 160-page book with nearly fifty full-color reproductions of Kay's gouache paintings that tell the story of a young boy and his uncle's travels around the world.

Beginning in 1923, Gertrude created illustrated paper doll inserts for magazines like Ladies Home Journal and Pictorial Review. Her most popular characters were two children named Polly and Peter Perkins introduced in the early 1930s, who she regularly illustrated to be cut out and played with in a variety of scenarios. Popular pages of Kay's Adventures of Polly and Peter Perkins paper doll series included themes of wedding fashion, gardening, the old woman who lived in a shoe, Valentine's Day, and Christmas.

== Works ==
During her time as an illustrator, Gertrude Kay published numerous children's books and contributed dozens of illustrations to publications like Ladies Home Journal and McCall's. In addition to her work in literature, Gertrude was also known for her illustrated paper dolls and magazine covers. The majority of her work was completed with gouache paints, though she also worked with ink. Her illustrations were highly regarded for their accurate portrayals of children and childhood. A book review published in The Saturday Review of Literature on January 2, 1926, said the following about Gertrude's book Adventures in Our Street:

"All the credit should be [Gertrude Kay's] for she is responsible for both the text and the illustrations. We liked the latter especially. Her children are quaint and very real little people and we found the endpapers showing them on the doorsteps of their storybook street a most satisfying sight indeed. The various chapters recount such simple and joyful doings as - parties, picnics, first and last days at school, rides on merry-go-rounds, bonfires in October, games in haylofts, and all the adventures that children like best to hear about."

=== Original books ===
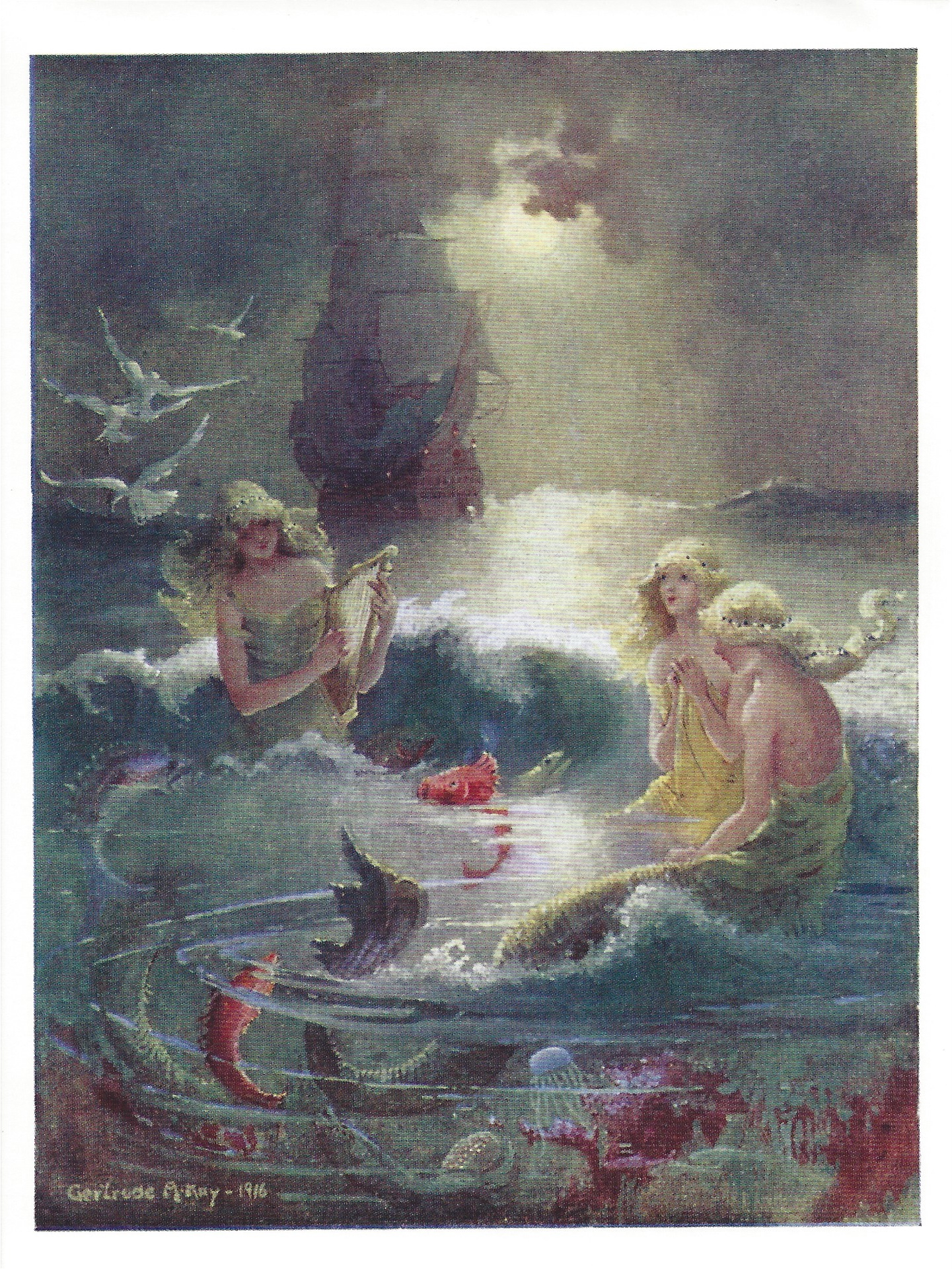
Moonlight Mermaids, When the Sandman Comes, 1916.

Gertrude Kay authored and illustrated at least ten original children's books between 1916 and 1931. Her books averaged approximately seventy-five pages and typically featured five-to-seven full-page, full-color gouache painting reproductions in addition to numerous ink line drawings scattered throughout the pages. Moffat, Yard & Co. and P.F. Volland Company published the majority of her books, many of which featured themes of fantasy. Her most popular titles were The Fairy Who Believed in Human Beings, Adventures in Our Street, and Adventures in Geography. As of 2022, many of Gertrude's publications have fallen out of print and entered the public domain.

A complete list of books known to be authored and illustrated by Gertrude Alice Kay:

- When the Sandman Comes, Stanton and ValVliet, 1916.
- The Book of Seven Wishes, Moffat, Yard & Co.,1917.
- The Fairy Who Believed in Human Beings, Moffat, Yard & Co., 1918.
- The Jolly Old Shadow Man, P.F. Volland Company, 1920.
- Helping the Weatherman, P.F. Volland Company, 1920.
- Adventures in Our Street, David McKay Publications, 1925.
- The Friends of Jimmy, P.F. Volland Company, 1926.
- Us Kids and the Circus, P.F. Volland Company, 1927.
- Adventures in Geography, The Wise-Parslow Company, 1930.
- Peter, Patter and Pixie, Robert M. McBride, 1931.
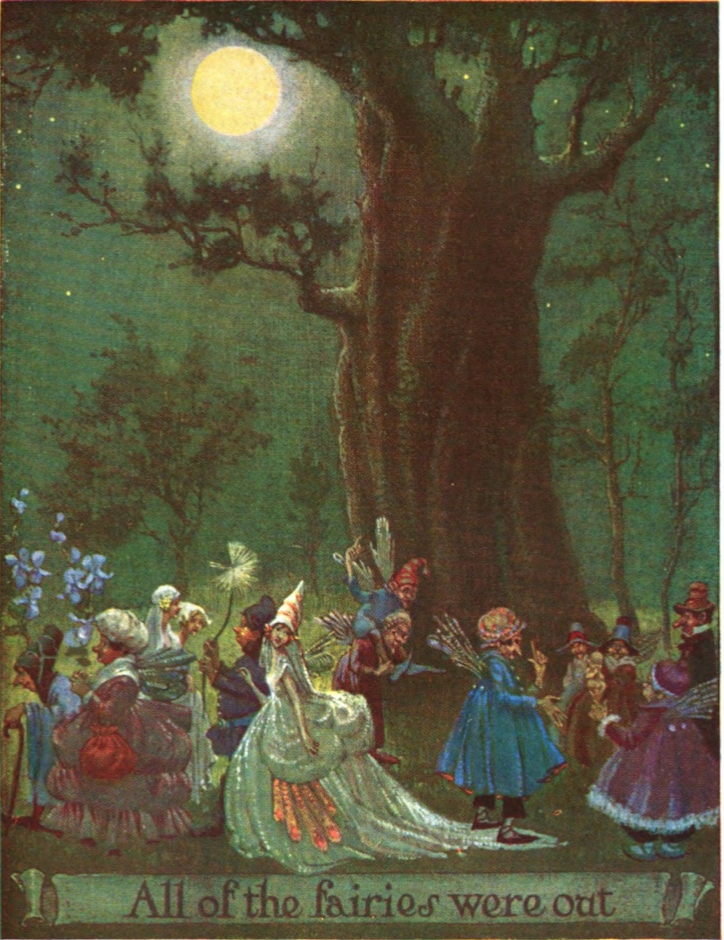
The Fairy Who Believed in Human Beings, 1918.

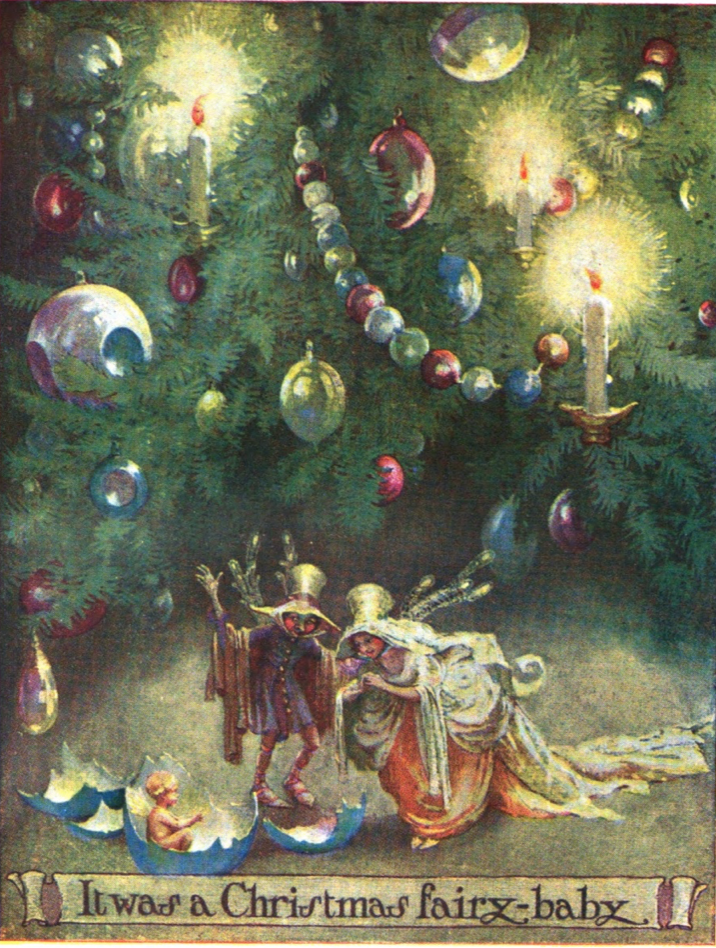
The Fairy Who Believed in Human Beings, 1918.

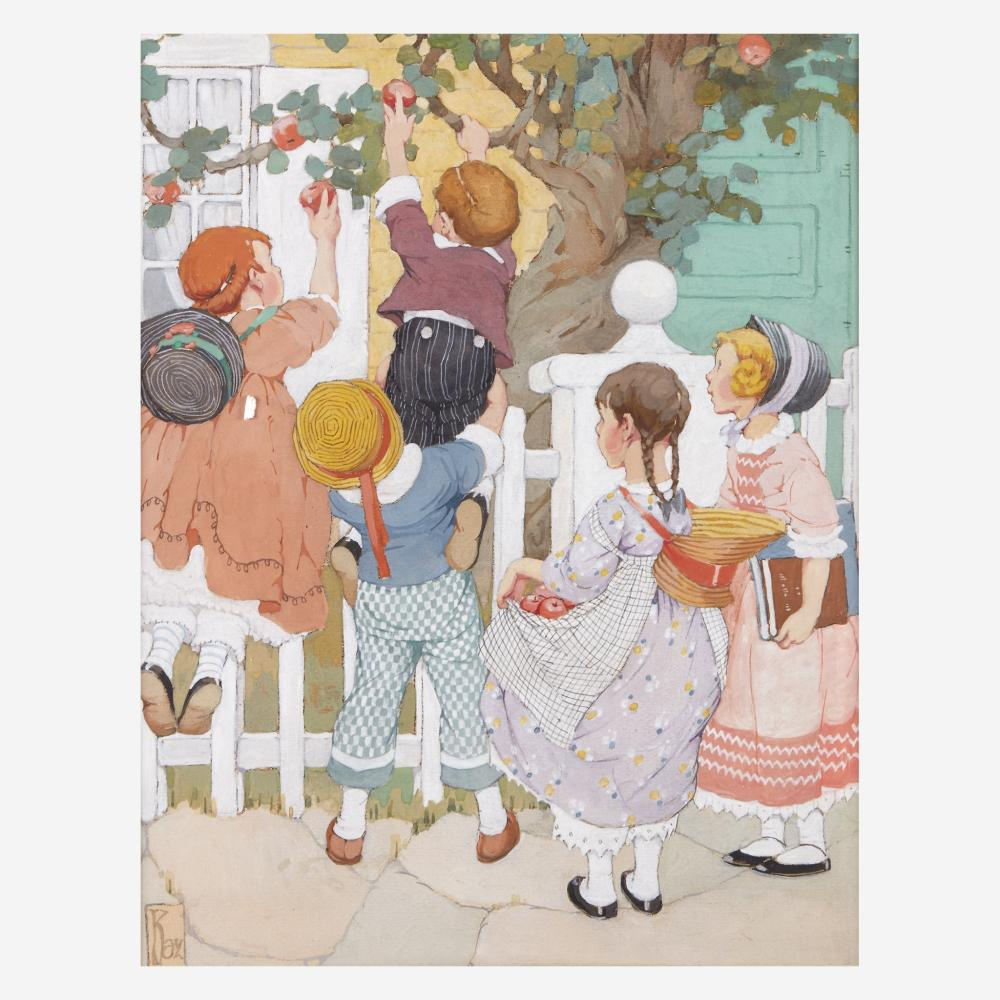
Adventures in Our Street (cover), 1925.

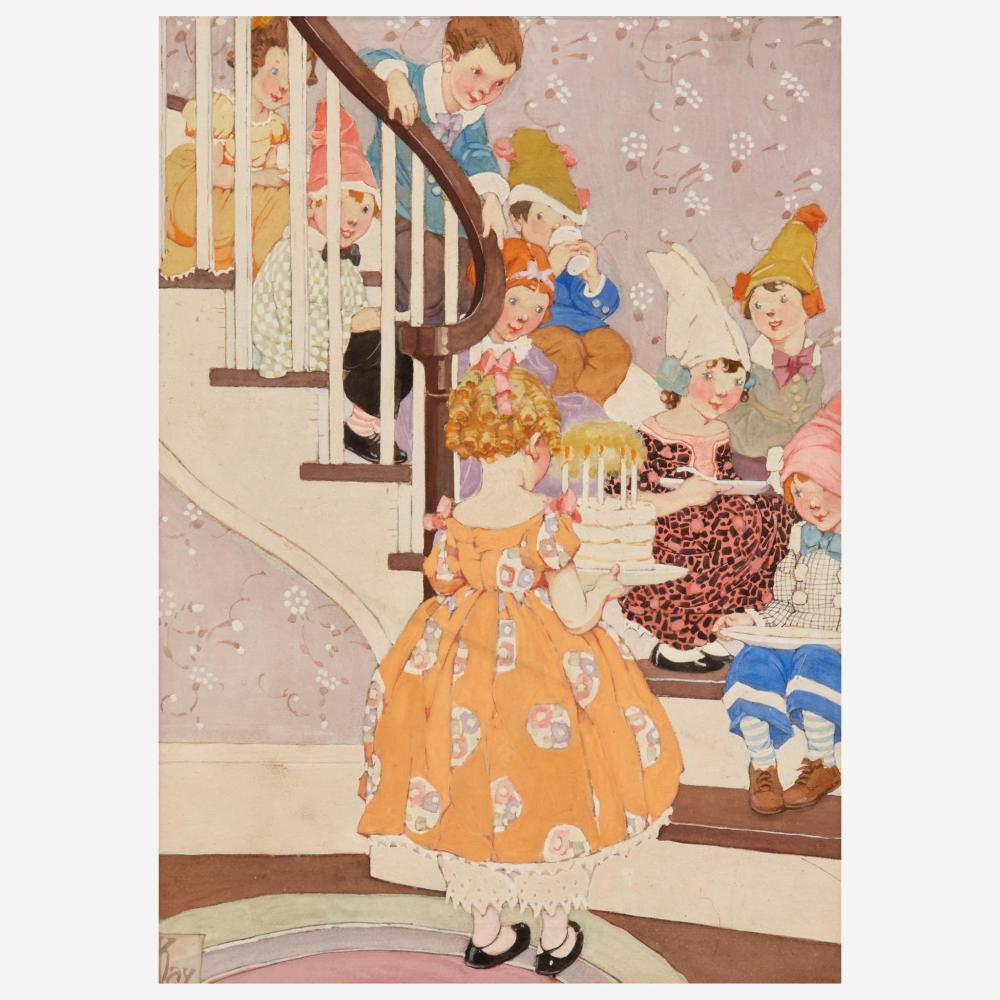
The Birthday Party on the Stairs, Adventures in Our Street, 1925.

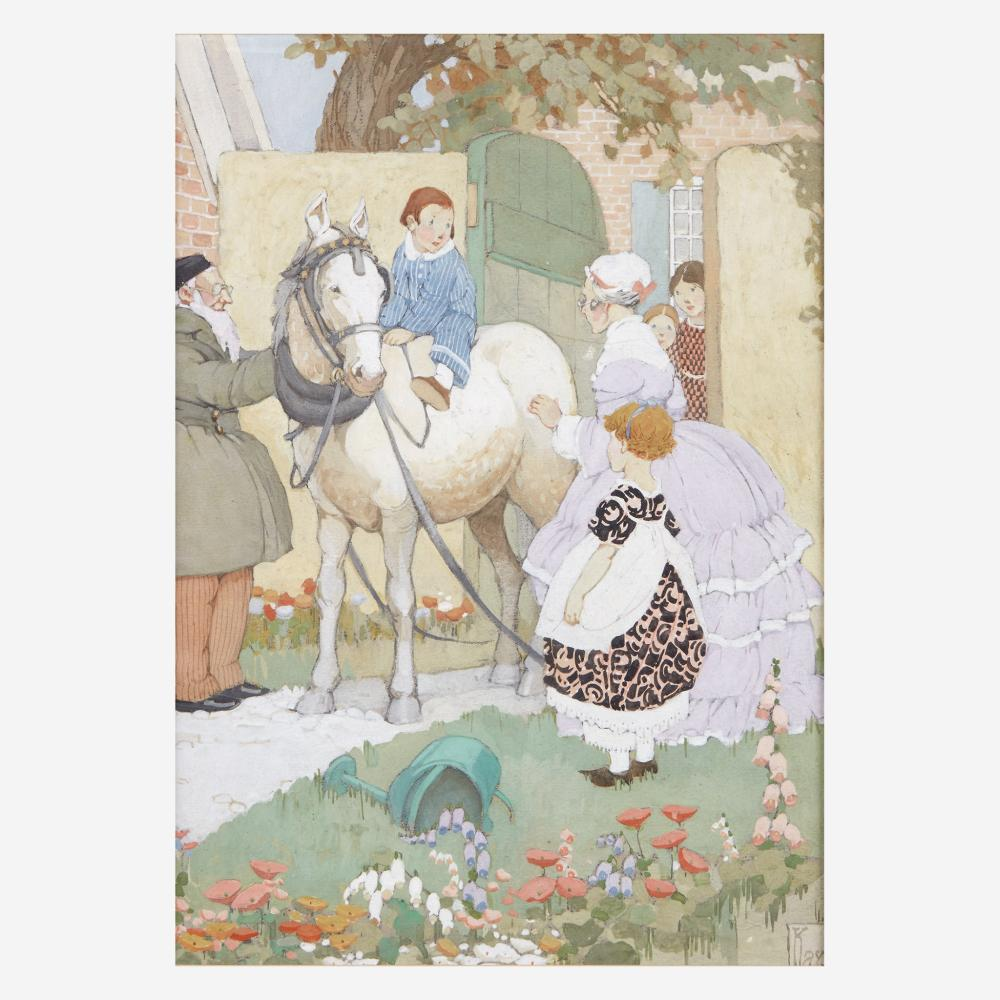
The Parson's Horse, Adventures in Our Street, 1925.

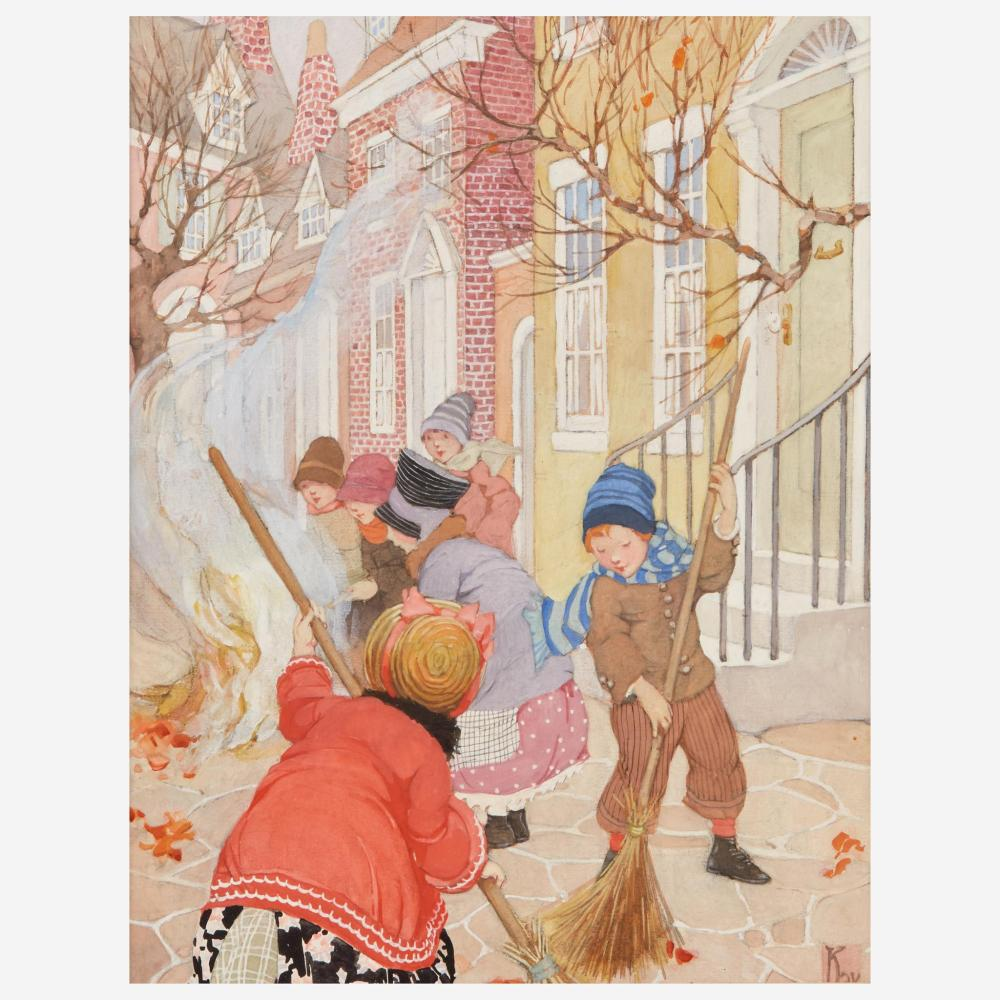
The Bonfire, Adventures in Our Street, 1925.

=== Books by other authors ===
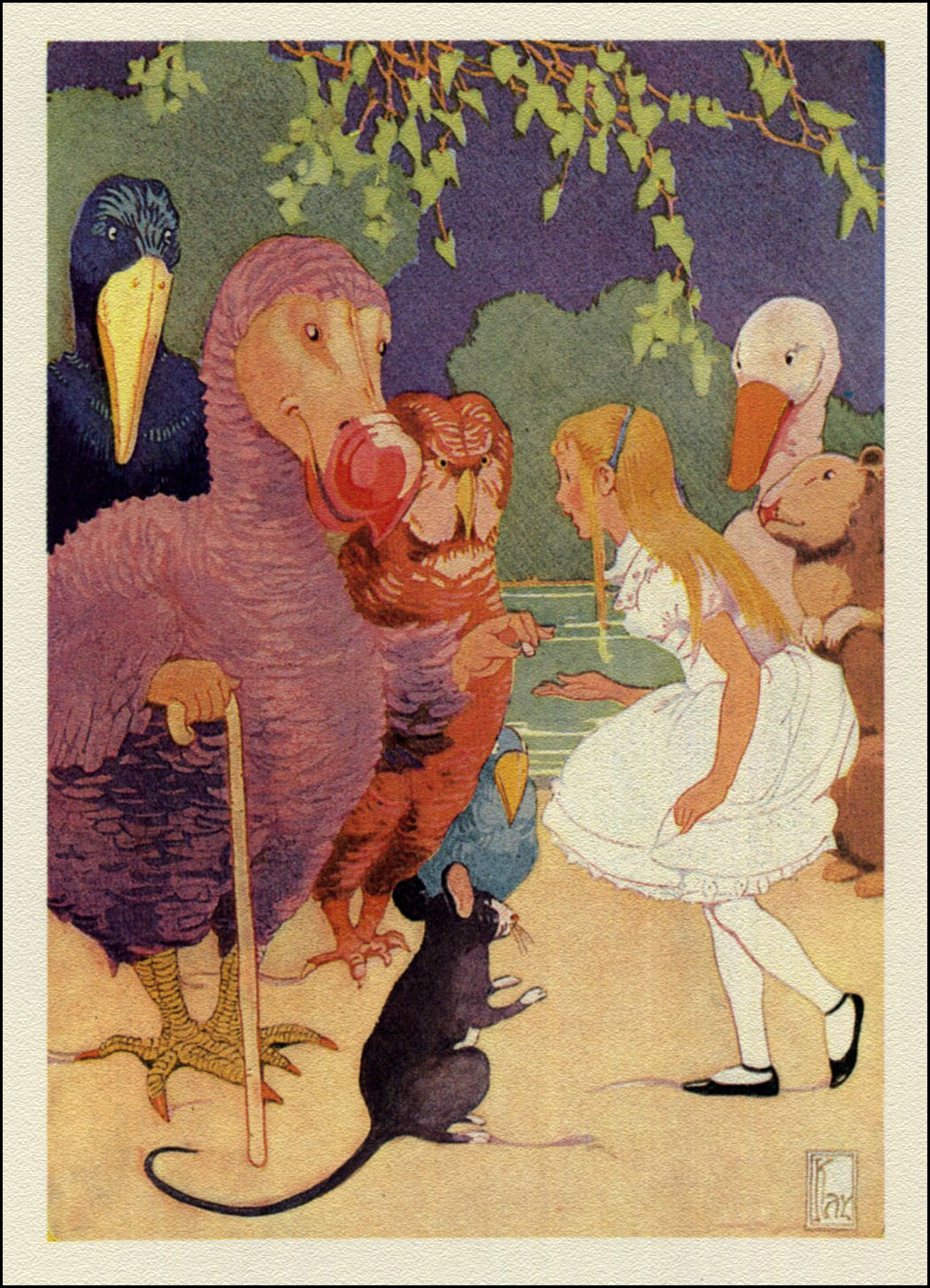
Alice's Adventures in Wonderland, 1923.

In addition to creating ten original children's books, Gertrude Kay is credited as the illustrator of nearly two dozen books written by other individuals. She typically contributed two-to-seven full-color gouache paintings to each novel, in addition to painting extravagant frontispieces. Prominent authors whose work was accompanied by Gertrude's illustrations include George MacDonald, Mary Dickerson Donahey, and Frances G. Wickes. Perhaps the most popular was Kay's iteration of Alice's Adventures in Wonderland by Lewis Carroll, published in 1923. Though she worked with more than fifteen different authors between 1909 and 1931, Kay had a particularly close relationship with journalist/author Sara Addington - illustrating six of her ten children's books between 1922 and 1927. Addington's series depicting life on an imagined "Pudding Lane" was especially popular, known for Kay's illustrations of fairy tale characters growing up alongside a young Santa Claus.

The following is a complete list of books known to have been written by other authors and illustrated by Gertrude Kay.

- Down Spider Web Lane, A Fairy Tale, Mary Dickerson Donahey, E. Stern & Co., Inc., 1909.
- Through the Little Green Door, Mary Dickerson Donahey, Barse & Hopkins, 1910.
- The House in the Hedge, Ralph Henry Barbour, Moffat, Yard & Co. 1911.
- All Aboard for Wonderland, Helen Ovington Kingsbury, Moffat, Yard & Co., 1917.
- Happy Holidays, Frances G. Wickes, Rand McNally, 1921.
- The Boy Who Lived in Pudding Lane, Sara Addington, 1922.
- Through the Cloud Mountain, Florence Scott Bernard, J.B. Lippincott & Co., 1922.
- Alice's Adventures in Wonderland, Lewis Carroll, 1923.
- The Pied Piper of Pudding Lane, Sara Addington, Atlantic Monthly Press, 1923.
- Round the Year in Pudding Lane, Sara Addington, Little, Brown and Company, 1924.
- The Field-Martin Primer, Walter Taylor Field, Ginn and Company, 1925.
- At the Back of the North Wind, George MacDonald, David McKay Publications,1926.
- The Comical Cruises of Captain Cooky, Royal Baking Powder Company, 1926.
- My Own Fairy Book, Andrew Lang, David McKay Publications, 1927.
- Grammar Town, Sara Addington, David McKay Publications, 1927.
- Tommy Tingle Tangle, Sara Addington, P.F. Volland Company, 1927.
- The Little Lame Prince and Other Stories, Dinah Craik, David McKay Publications, 1927.
- Lulu's Library, Louisa May Alcott, Little, Brown and Company, 1930.
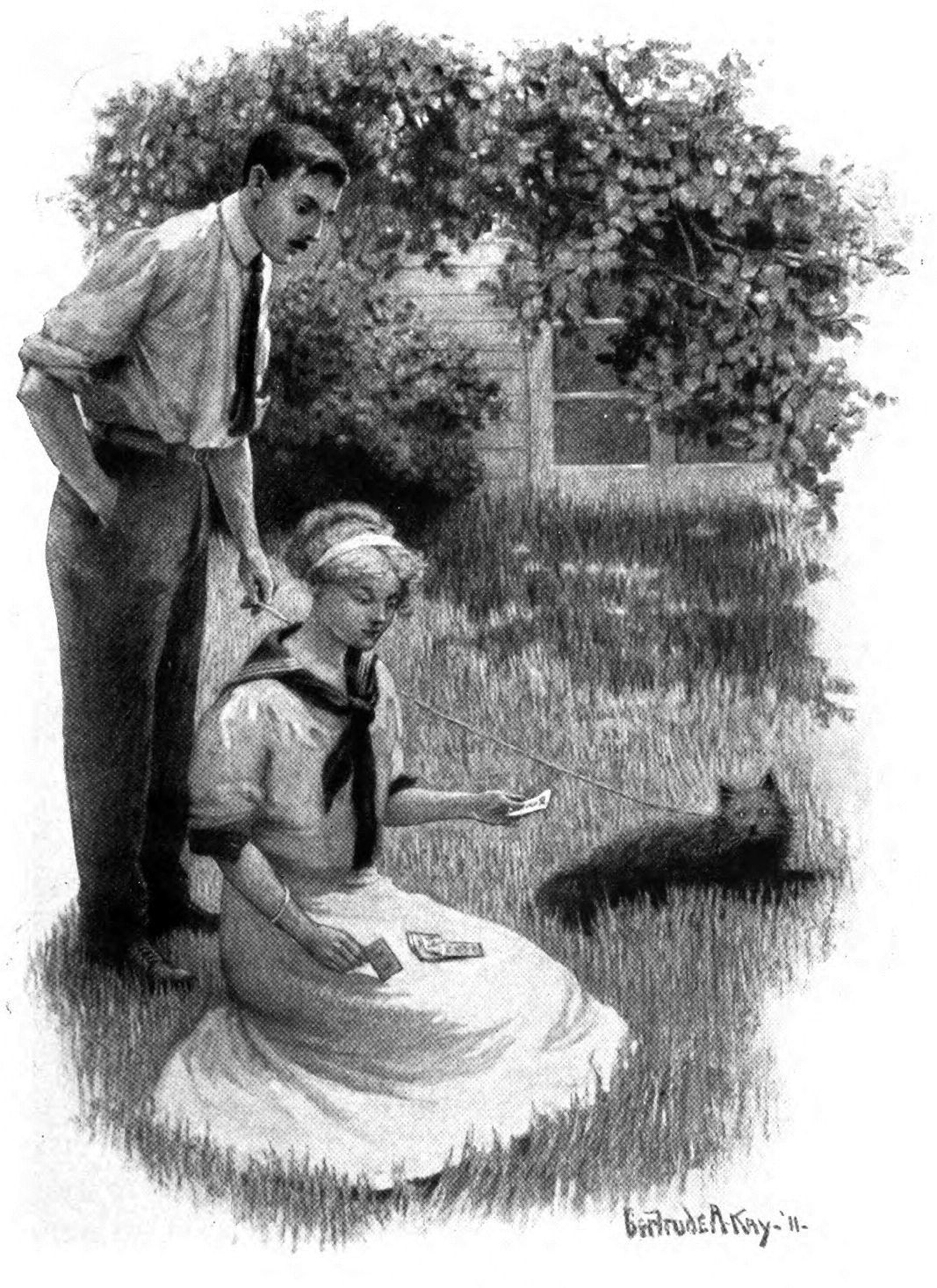
The House in the Hedge (p. 34), 1911.

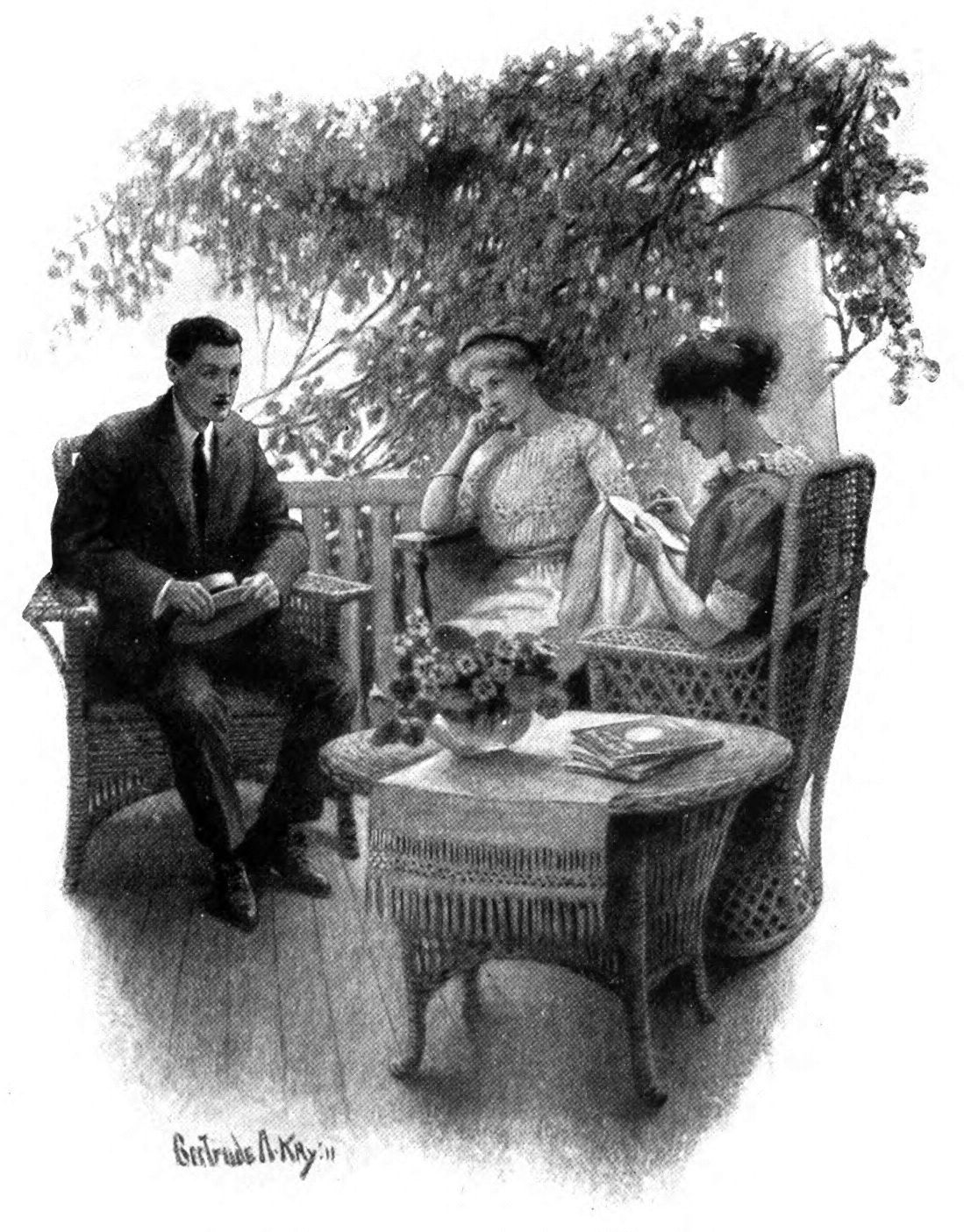
The House in the Hedge (p. 172), 1911.

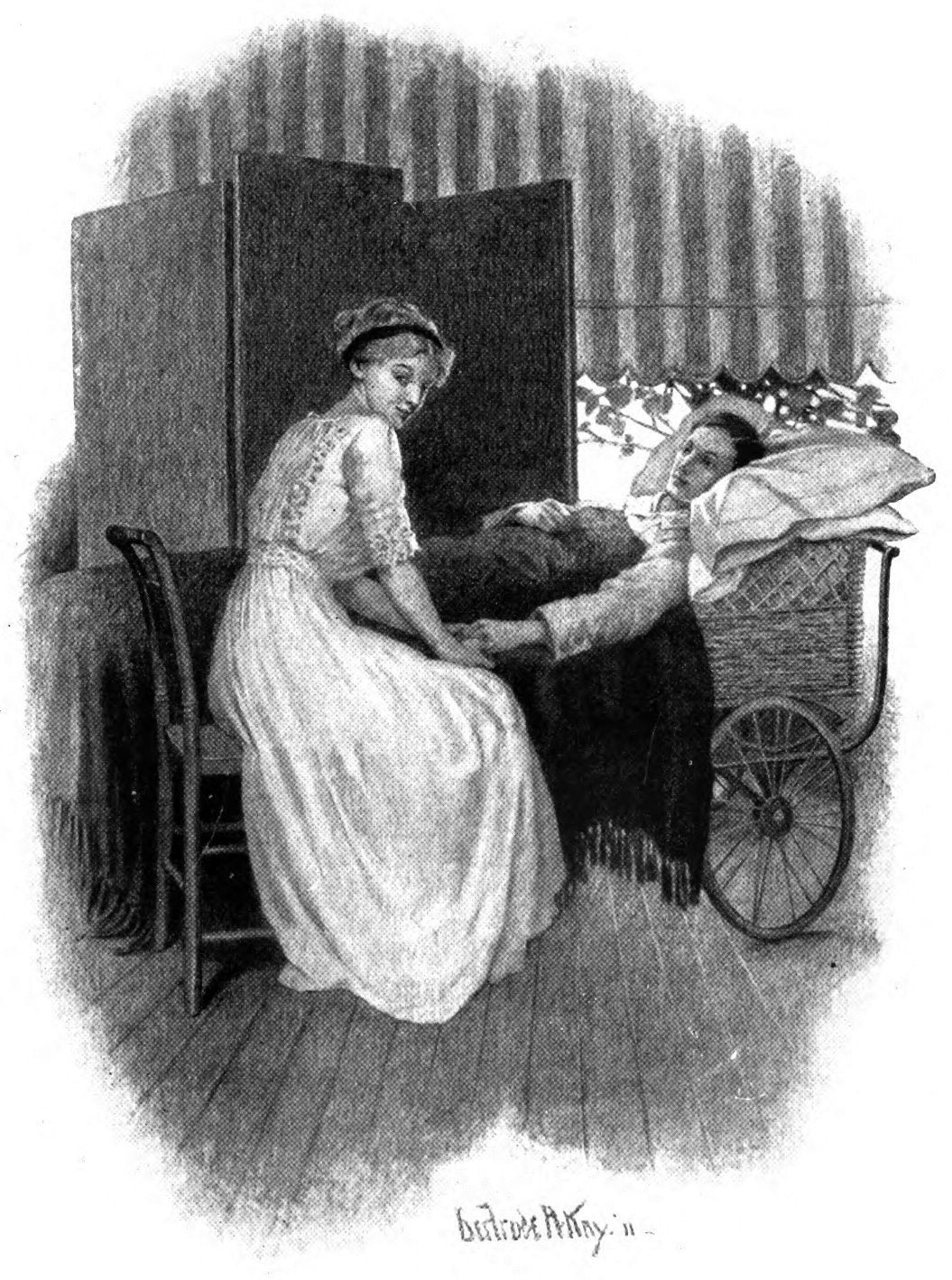
House in the Hedge (p. 248), 1911.

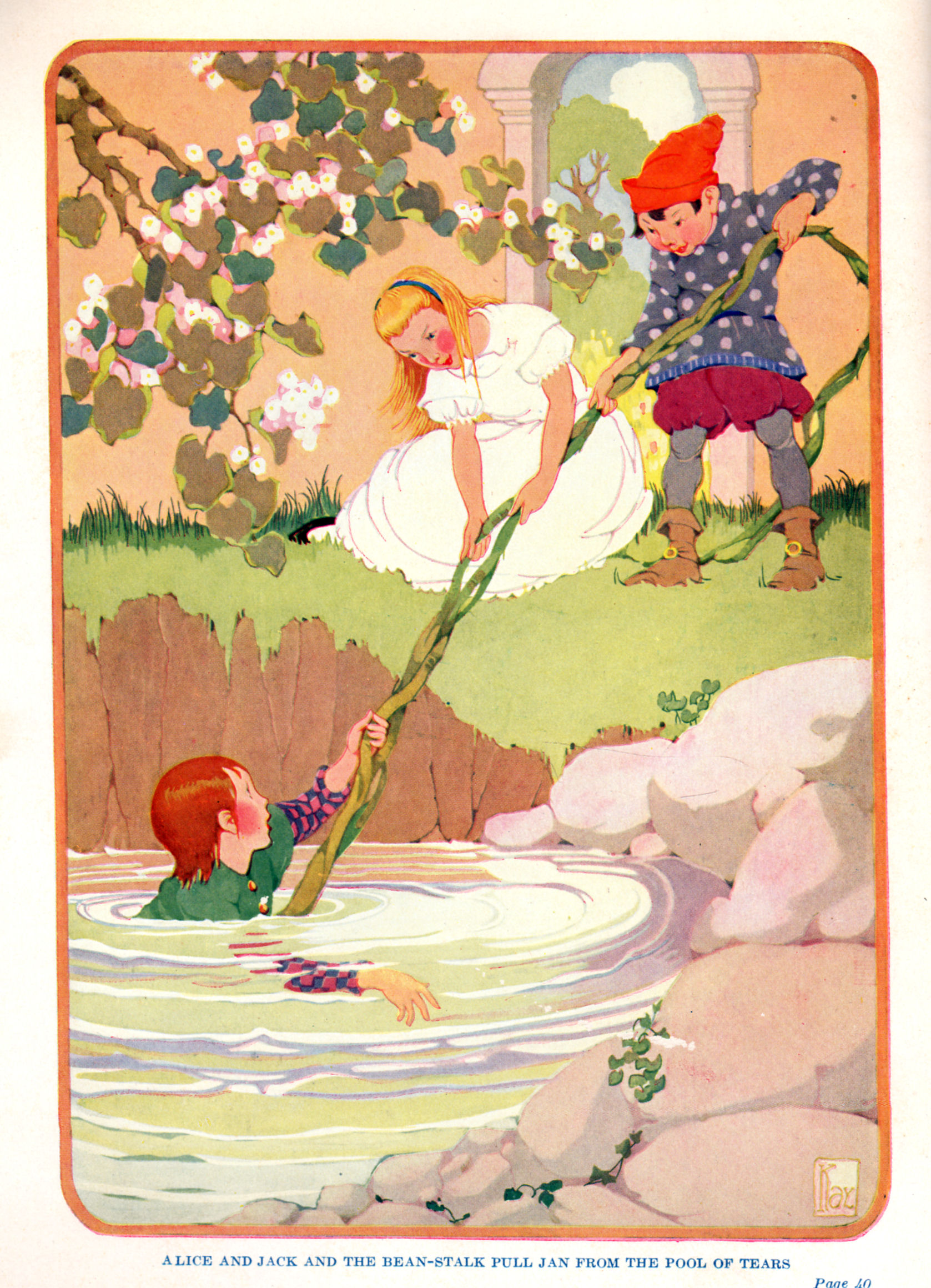
Through the Cloud Mountain, 1922.

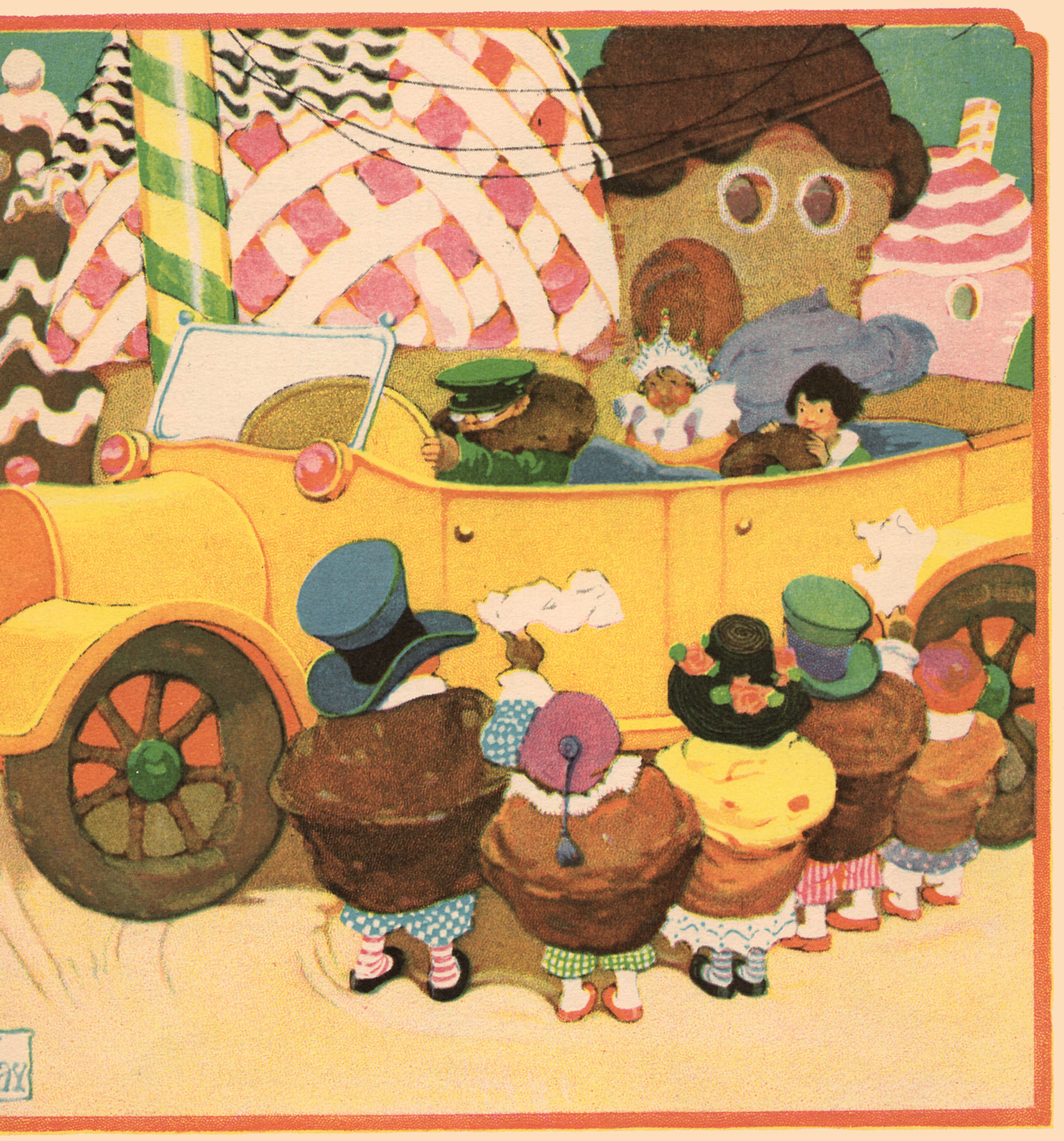
Royal Baking Powder Company, 1923.

The Pied Piper in Pudding Lane, 1923.

=== Publications ===
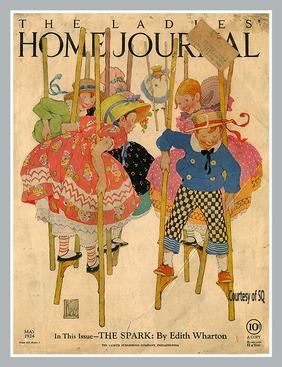
Ladies' Home Journal, May 1924.

Through the end of her career, Gertrude Kay regularly contributed illustrations for covers and features in popular magazines such as Ladies' Home Journal, The American Girl, Woman's World, and Good Housekeeping. In the early 1910s, she was a regular illustration contributor to St. Nicholas, a literary magazine specifically for younger readers. A "who's who in America" book published in 1923 included Everybody's Magazine, Outlook, Pictorial Review, and Designer among Kay's publication credits.

A small selection of Gertrude Kay's illustrative contributions to periodical publications:

- The Youth's Companion, feature, December 1920.
- Ladies' Home Journal, cover, May 1924.
- Ladies' Home Journal, cover, March 1926.
- Woman's World, cover, April 1934.
- Woman's World, cover, August 1934.
- The American Girl, cover, May 1935.
- The American Girl, cover, August 1935.
- The American Girl, cover, November 1936.
- The Country Gentleman, cover, 1939.
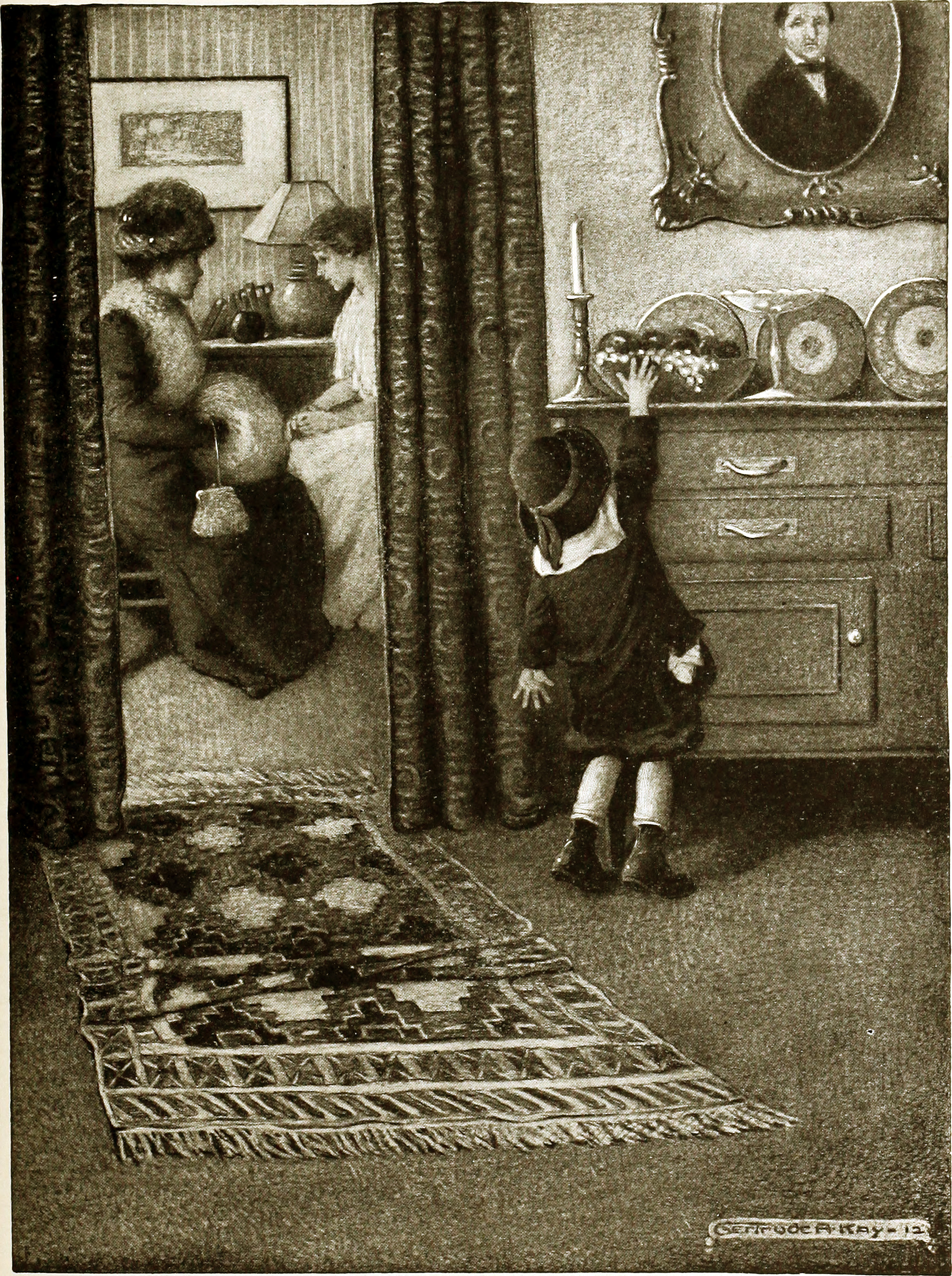
St. Nicholas, vol. 40 no. 1, 1912.

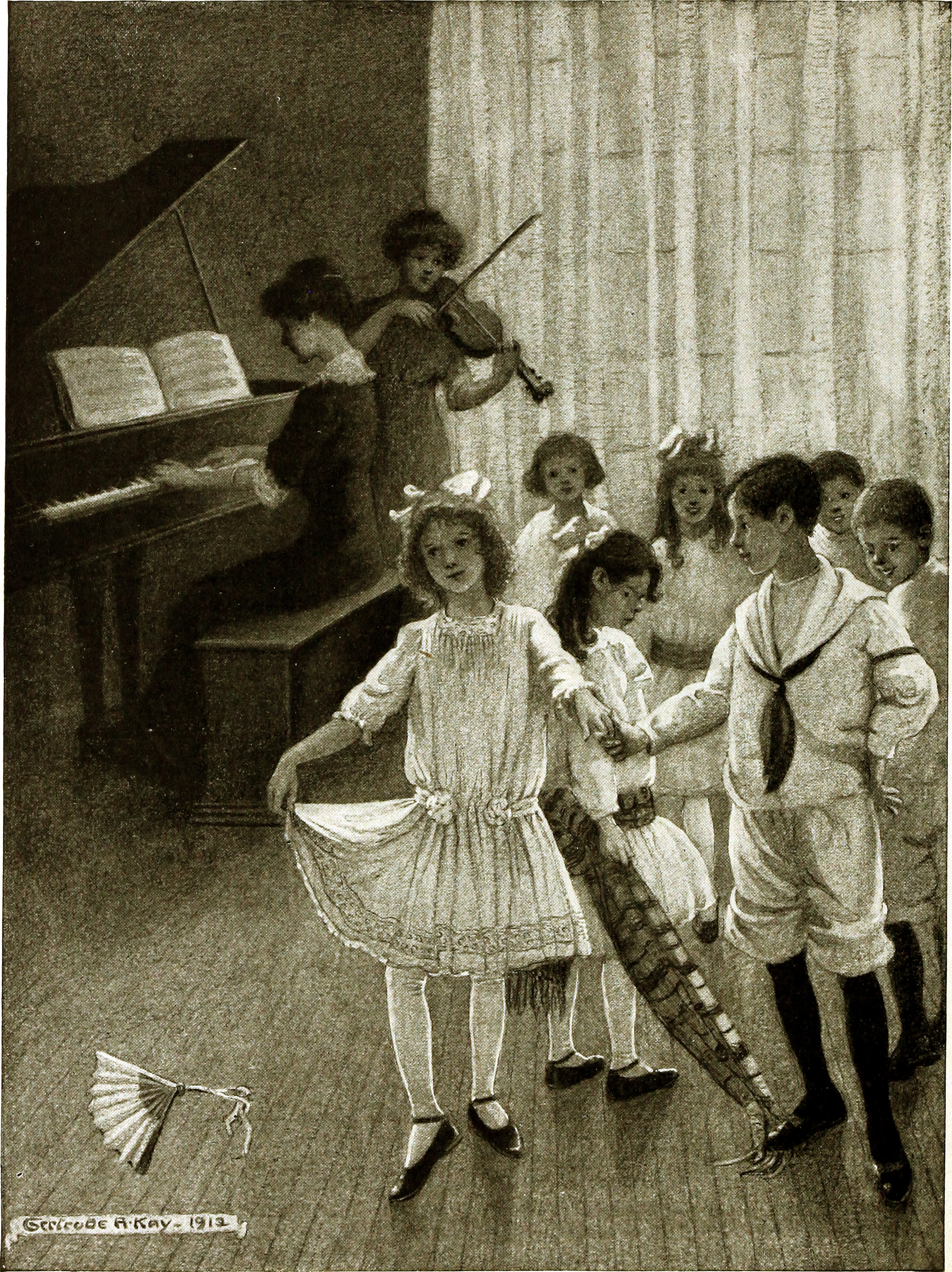
St. Nicholas vol. 40 no. 6, 1913.

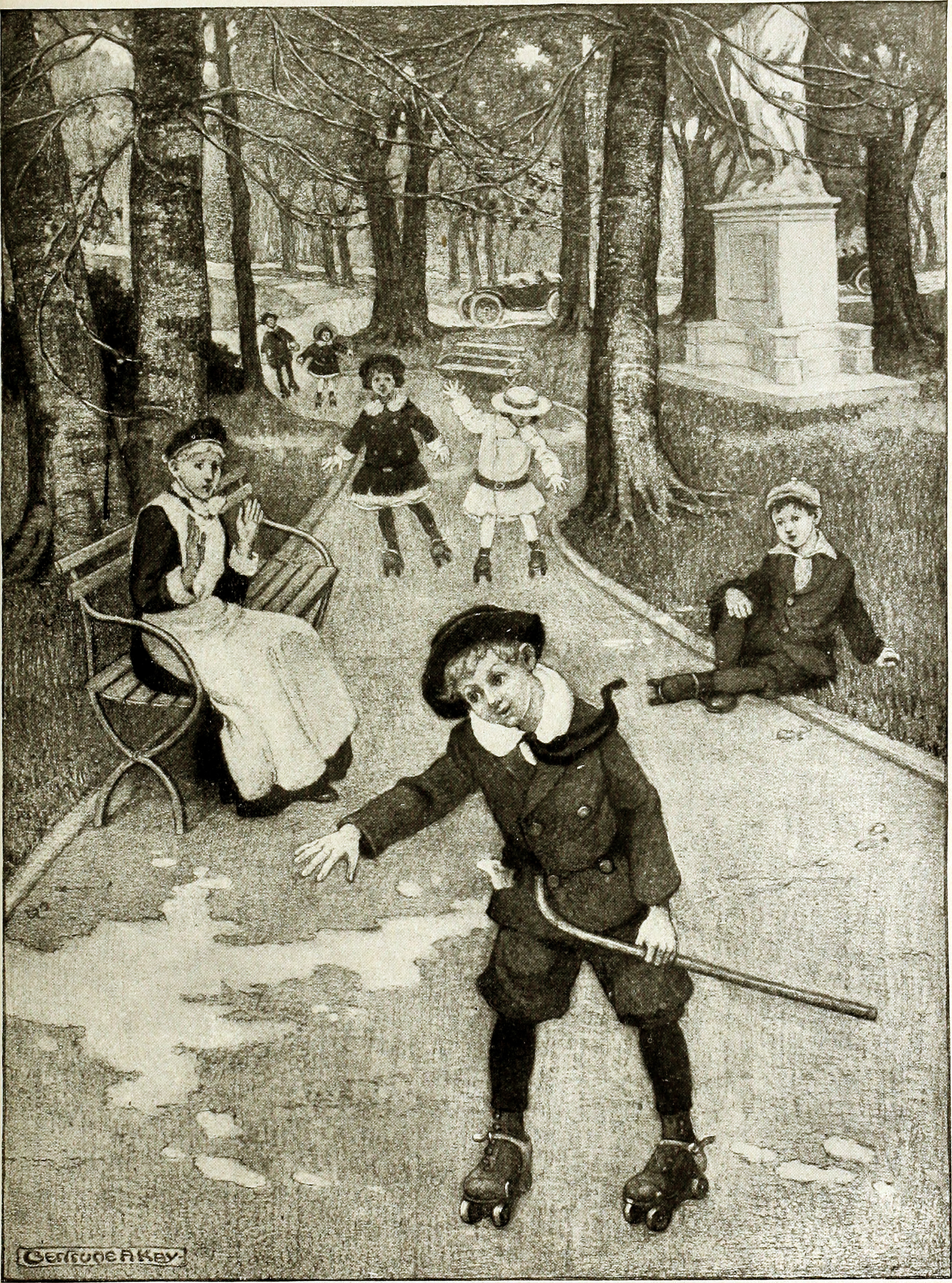
St. Nicholas, vol. 40 no. 7, 1913.

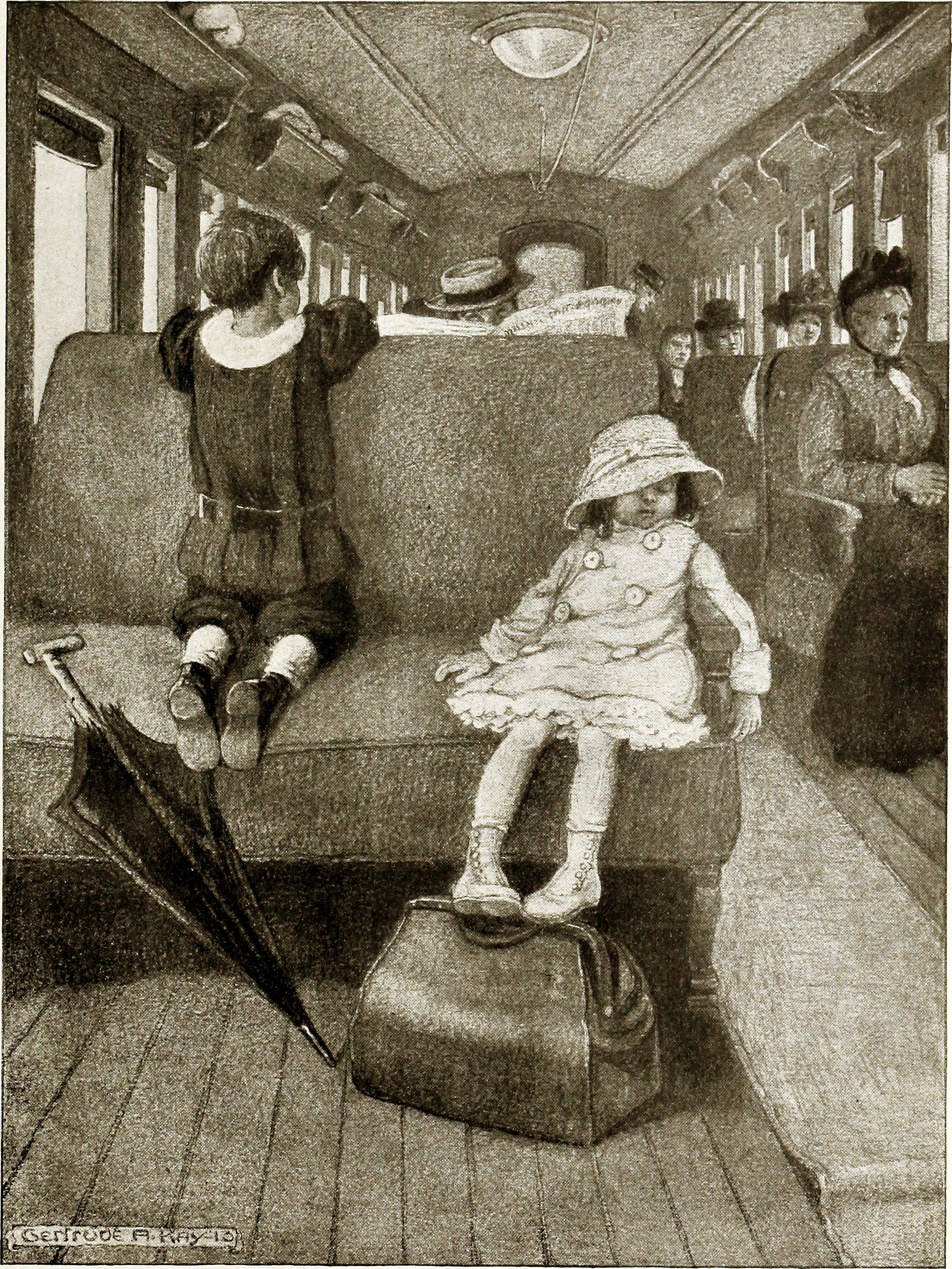
St. Nicholas, vol. 40 no. 9, 1913.

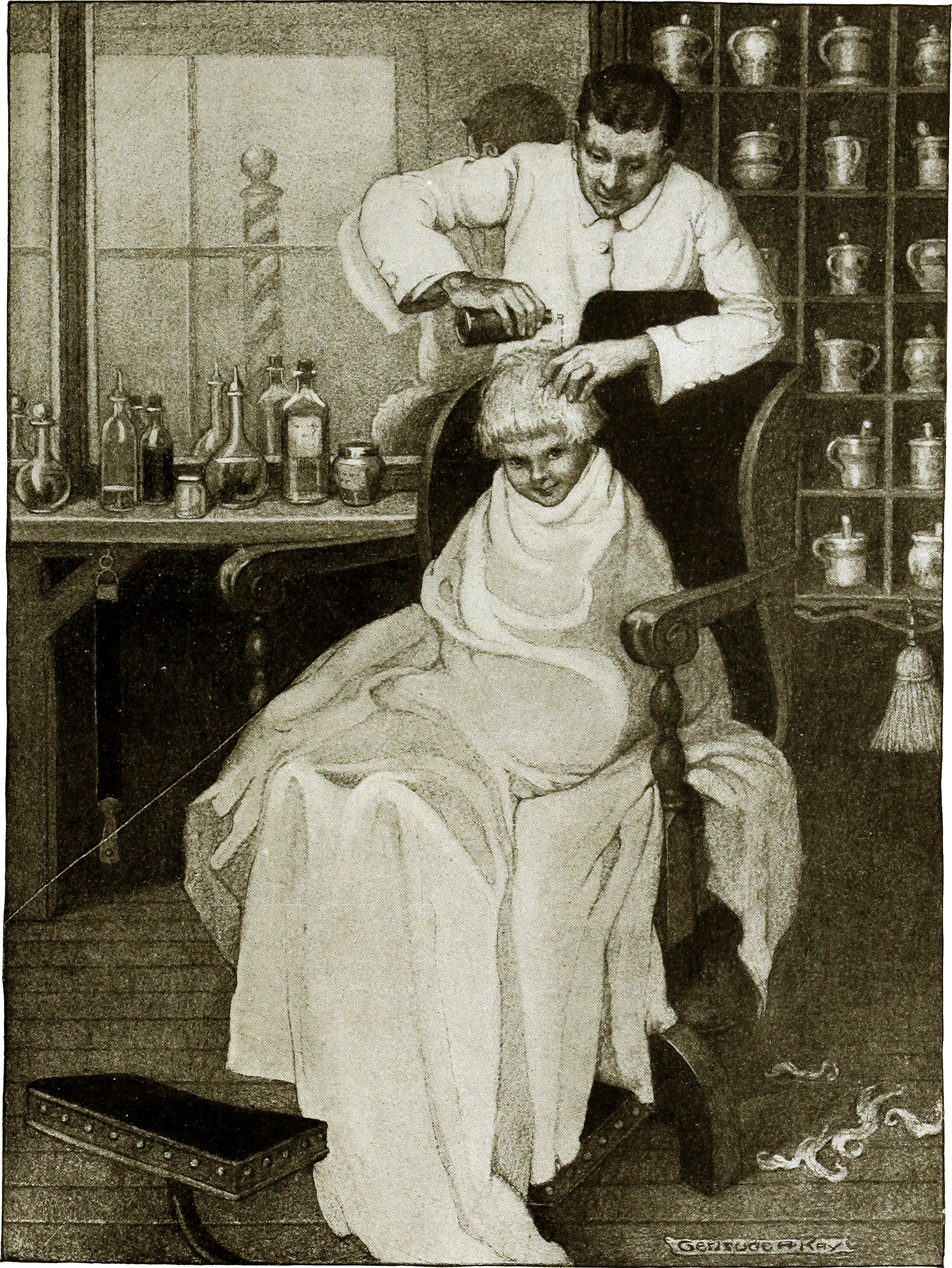
St. Nicholas, vol. 40 no. 11, 1913.

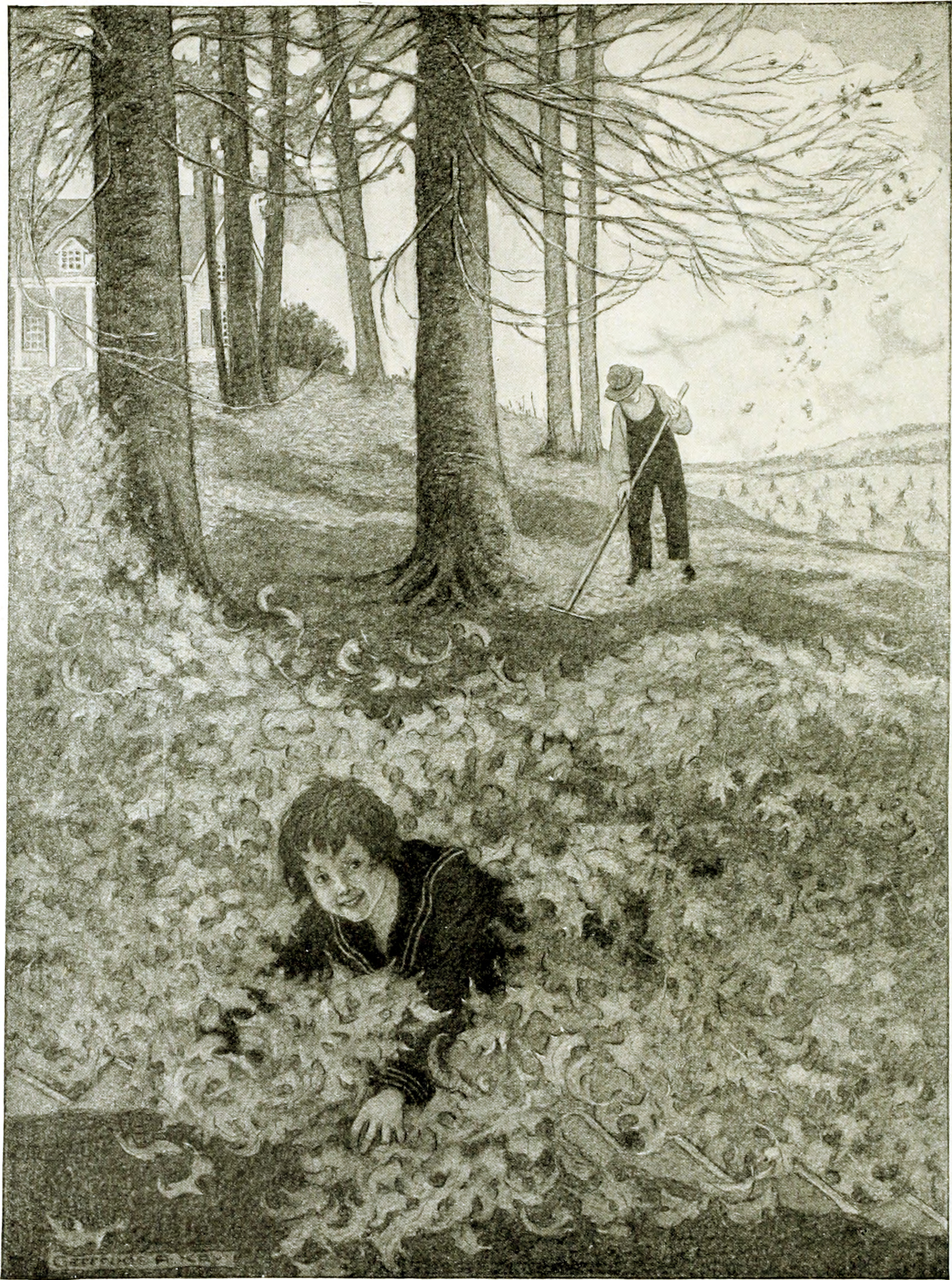
St. Nicholas, vol. 41 no. 1, 1913.

== Legacy ==
In 1967, one of Kay's alma maters, Alliance High School, added her name to the school's Hall of Fame. Notably, Gertrude Kay is credited with convincing prolific children's book illustrator and author Brinton Turkle (1915–2003) to pursue an education in the arts.

=== Collections ===
Few institutions currently count Gertrude Alice Kay's original illustrations amongst their collections. The Library of Congress holds her 1930 gouache painting Asian Mother and Two Children in Rickshaw, and the Delaware Art Museum holds her ink-on-board illustration Woman Reading on Sofa completed in 1914. The John D. Merriam Collection at the Boston Public Library, dedicated to preserving original art from children's literature, holds three of the original ink and watercolor illustrations from her 1930 publication Lulu's Library.

Kay's original children's books and colorful illustrations can be found in the collections of numerous libraries and universities including Princeton University, University of Victoria Libraries, and Ohio State University.
