= Spring (journal) =

Spring: A Journal of Archetype and Culture is a biannual peer-reviewed academic journal of psychology produced by the Analytical Psychology Club of New York. It is published by Spring Publications. The journal was established in 1949 and presents itself as the oldest Jungian psychology journal. The editor-in-chief is Nancy Cater.
