= London Bridge Wharf =

Former wharf in the City of London

Coordinates: 51.508892°N 0.086936°W

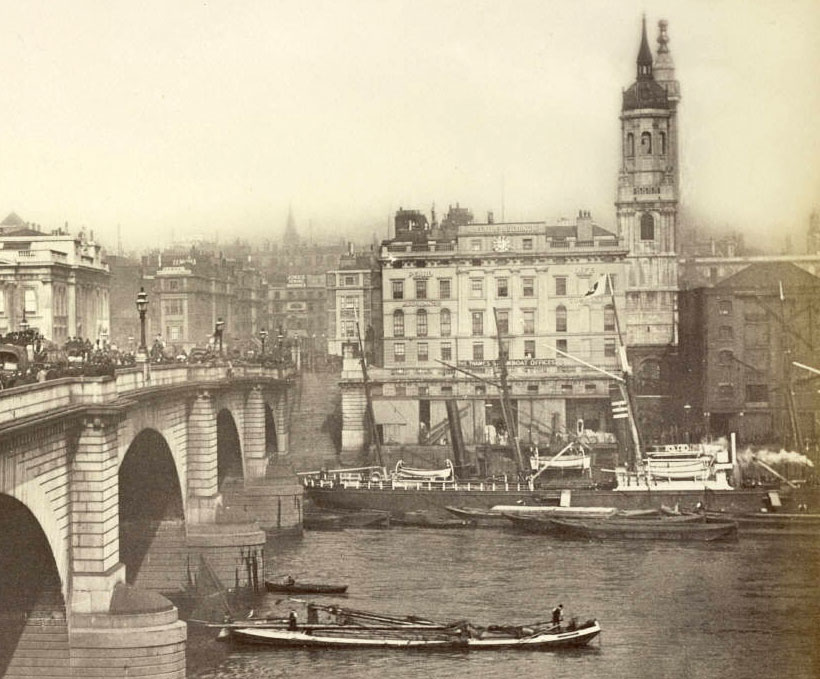
London Bridge Wharf with a steamship in front of it, shown in the 1870s or 1880s

London Bridge Wharf was a wharf in the City of London located alongside London Bridge, just to the east of the north end of the bridge. It stood below the Adelaide Buildings and their 1925 replacement, Adelaide House. The wharf was constructed on the site of the London Bridge Waterworks, which had been demolished along with Old London Bridge in 1832. It originally handled general cargo and also passenger steamships, such as the vessels of the New Medway Steam Packet Company, which offered daily "sea cruises" along the North Kent and Essex coasts.

In the 1930s it was taken over by the neighbouring Fresh Wharf, which built a ten-storey warehouse next to Adelaide House in 1953. Only 20 years later the warehouse was demolished and the area was redeveloped into office blocks. Adelaide House still stands but the area once occupied by London Bridge Wharf is now publicly accessible as part of the Thames Path.
