= Santa Claus' daughter =

Fictional character

Santa Claus' daughter is a character of Christmas folklore who appeared in North America in the late 19th century.

== History ==
One of the first works to present this figure was a short musical play of 1892 called Santa Claus' Daughter (by Everett Elliott and F. W. Hardcastle). In this piece, the young Kitty Claus, who has known no one but her papa, asks him to find her a man.

== Books ==
In his book NOEL (2000), Ed McCray told the life story of the Clauses' daughter, Noel.

Bestselling novelist James Patterson, wrote a book in 2004 for young audiences about Santa's daughter Chrissie. Chrissie spends her days playing with reindeer and elves. Until one day when the Big Boss of the Exmas Express company, Warrie Ransom, arrives and declares that "EVERYTHING IS FOR SALE"—including Christmas! With the North Pole run by Exmas Express, work is 24 hours a day, 7 days a week. Spirits sink so low that poor Santa can't even get himself out of bed. But come Christmas Eve, someone has to make sure that children everywhere wake up to their gifts under the tree. It's Chrissie's memory of her father's own magical words that gives her the courage to save the day.

In The Legend of Holly Claus (2006, by Brittney Ryan), Santa and Mrs. Claus enjoy a miraculous birth, but because of a terrible curse, the heart of their daughter is frozen.

== Television ==
In recent years, Santa Claus' daughter has notably featured in a number of television films where she is often trying to help or to escape her father.

- In Once Upon a Christmas (2001), Kristin Claus (Kathy Ireland) opposes her sister Rudolfa who is trying to ruin the spirit of Christmas.
- In Santa Baby (2006), Mary Claus (Jenny McCarthy) is a businesswoman who tries to use her successful management techniques in the North Pole.
- In Annie Claus Is Coming To Town (2011), Santa's daughter (Maria Thayer) moves to California to find love and have her own career.
- In Becoming Santa (2015), Holly Claus (Laura Bell Bundy) brings her boyfriend home to meet the parents.
- In the Disney+ film Noelle, Anna Kendrick plays the titular character who has to follow in her famous father's footsteps.
- In the Netflix original movie Santa Girl (2019), Jennifer Stone plays Cassandra "Cassie" Claus who wants to find herself and see the world and is reluctant to take over the family business despite the wishes of her father (played by Barry Bostwick).

== Comics ==
- Jingle Belle features a version of Santa's daughter created by Paul Dini, best known for his work on the DC Animated Universe.

== Music ==
A number of female singers have used Santa girl or Santa's daughter costumes for clips or shows. Among them are:

- Mariah Carey, for the album Merry Christmas (1994).
- Destiny's Child, in the music video for 8 Days of Christmas (2001)
- Katy Perry in a live show.

== Film ==
- The main characters of the 2004 film Mean Girls dress up as Santa's daughter while performing the song "Jingle Bell Rock".
- The character of Madison Finch (Alia Shawkat) in the 2006 film Deck the Halls wears a Santa's daughter costume while dancing to the song "Santa Baby".
- Sophiana, the protagonist of the 2007 film Christmas Is Here Again, is adopted by Santa and Mrs. Claus.

== Other cultures ==
For many Slavs, Ded Moroz (the equivalent of Santa Claus) is accompanied by Snegurochka, his daughter or granddaughter.

== See also ==
- Mrs. Claus
