= 1798 Bank of Pennsylvania heist =

1798 robbery in Philadelphia, Pennsylvania, USA

Coordinates: 39.9481°N 75.1472°W

- Date: August 31 – September 1, 1798
- Location: Carpenters' Hall in Philadelphia, Pennsylvania
- Type: Robbery
- Target: Bank of Pennsylvania
- Perpetrators: Isaac Davis and Thomas Cunningham
- Suspects: Patrick Lyon

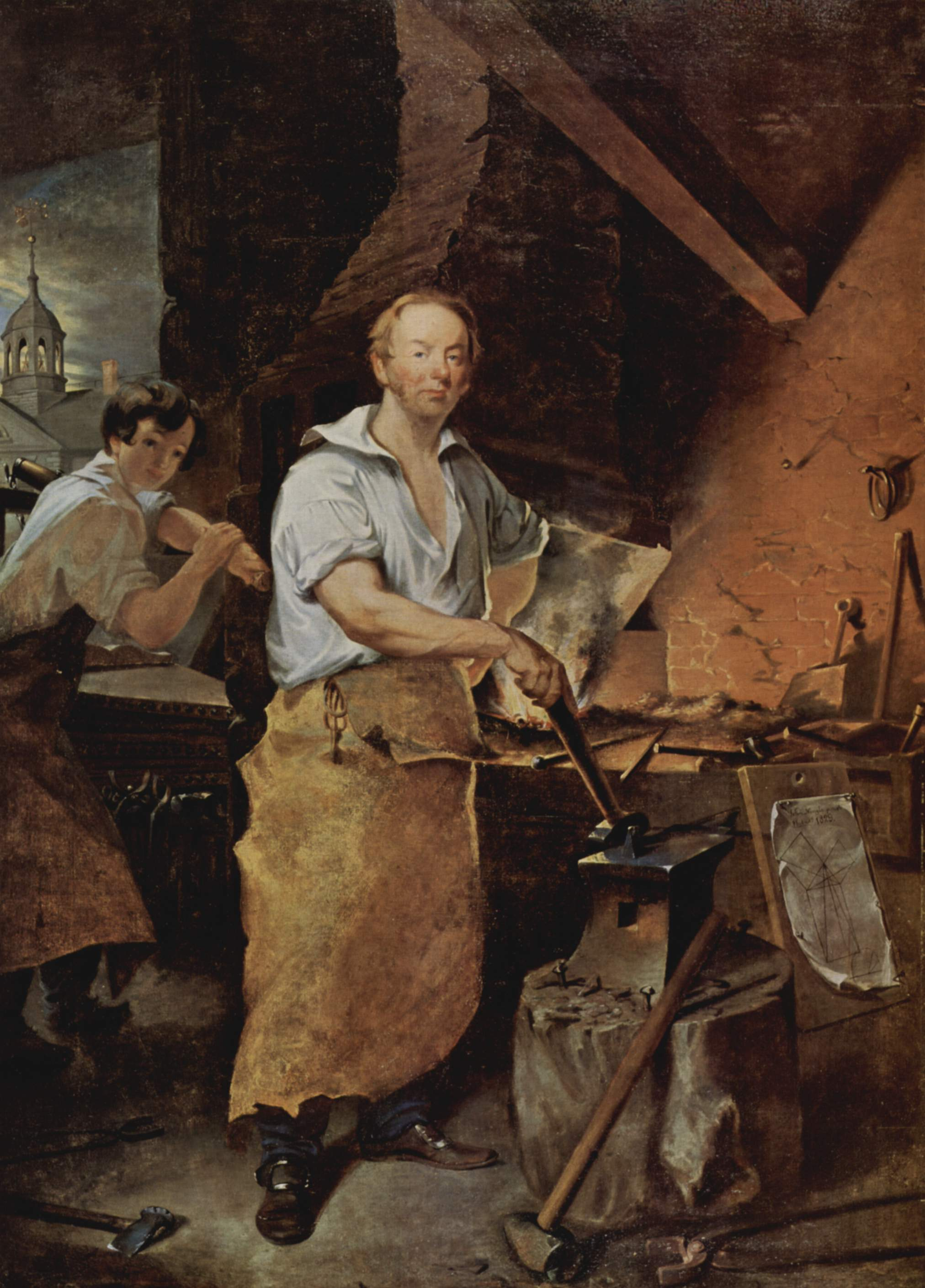
Pat Lyon at the Forge (1829), Pennsylvania Academy of the Fine Arts

The 1798 Bank of Pennsylvania heist was the robbery of $162,821 (over $3.1 million today) on the night between August 31 and September 1, 1798, from the Bank of Pennsylvania at Carpenters' Hall in Philadelphia, Pennsylvania by Isaac Davis and Thomas Cunningham. It is notable as the first major bank robbery in the United States.

== Crime ==
The bank showed no signs of forced entry and the vault was believed to have been opened with a forged key.

== False imprisonment of Pat Lyon ==
Patrick Lyon, a blacksmith who had forged the vault doors and fitted the locks just weeks before the robbery, was initially a suspect in the heist. However, Lyon had left Philadelphia for Lewes, Delaware on August 26, 1798, to escape a yellow fever epidemic. Lyon returned to Philadelphia to plead his case but he was imprisoned anyway; constable John Haines wanted to collect the $2,000 reward. Lyon spent three months in Walnut Street Jail, much of it in solitary confinement, where he did contract yellow fever and almost died. His bail was set at $150,000, almost the entire amount that was stolen.

== Perpetrators ==
The two perpetrators of the heist, Isaac Davis, a member of the Carpenters' Company, the guild that owned the building, and Thomas Cunningham, a porter at the bank, were later caught. Cunningham died of yellow fever several days after the heist. Davis, who had visited Lyon's shop while he was forging the doors, aroused suspicion after depositing the stolen money in several banks, including the one he had burglarized, and he later confessed to the heist. Patrick Lyon stayed in jail even after Isaac Davis confessed to the robbery. Davis admitted to the crime after being caught depositing the stolen money and was let go in a deal arranged by his uncle, a powerful judge. Despite this, Lyon was not released right away because bank officials still suspected he had made a copy of the vault key. However, in a corrupt deal brokered by Davis's uncle, Benjamin Brannon, a powerful judge, Davis was pardoned by the Governor of Pennsylvania without serving any jail time after he gave back the stolen money in a plea bargain.

== Aftermath ==
Lyon was cleared by a grand jury in January 1799. Lyon wrote a book on his false imprisonment titled Narrative of Patrick Lyon Who Suffered Three Months Severe Imprisonment in Philadelphia Gaol on Merely a Vague Suspicion of Being Concerned in a Robbery of the Bank of Pennsylvania With his Remarks Thereon, published in 1799. He sued the president of the Bank of Pennsylvania, two other bank officials, the city constable and an alderman for damages over false imprisonment. Lyon was represented by Alexander J. Dallas. In 1805, after a 4-hour deliberation by a jury, Lyon was awarded $12,000 ($258,000 today) for false imprisonment; in 1807, an appeal by the defendants was settled out of court for $9,000 ($197,900 today).

Using the funds from his settlement payment, Lyon commissioned a portrait of himself painted by John Neagle, titled Pat Lyon at the Forge, depicting Lyon standing at a forge with the cupola of the Walnut Street Prison visible in the background.

== See also ==
- List of bank robbers and robberies
