= Anne Baker =

Anne or Ann Baker may refer to:

- Anne Baker (biographer) (1914–2025), British writer of historical biographies, daughter of Geoffrey Salmond
- Anne Elizabeth Baker (1786–1861), English philologist, historian and illustrator
- Ann Baker (1930–2017), American television and film character actor
- Ann Baker (singer) (1915–1999), American jazz singer
- Ann Carson, born Ann Baker (1785–1824), American criminal
