= Walnut Street Prison =

Demolished prison in Philadelphia, PA, US

Coordinates: 39.947°N 75.147°W

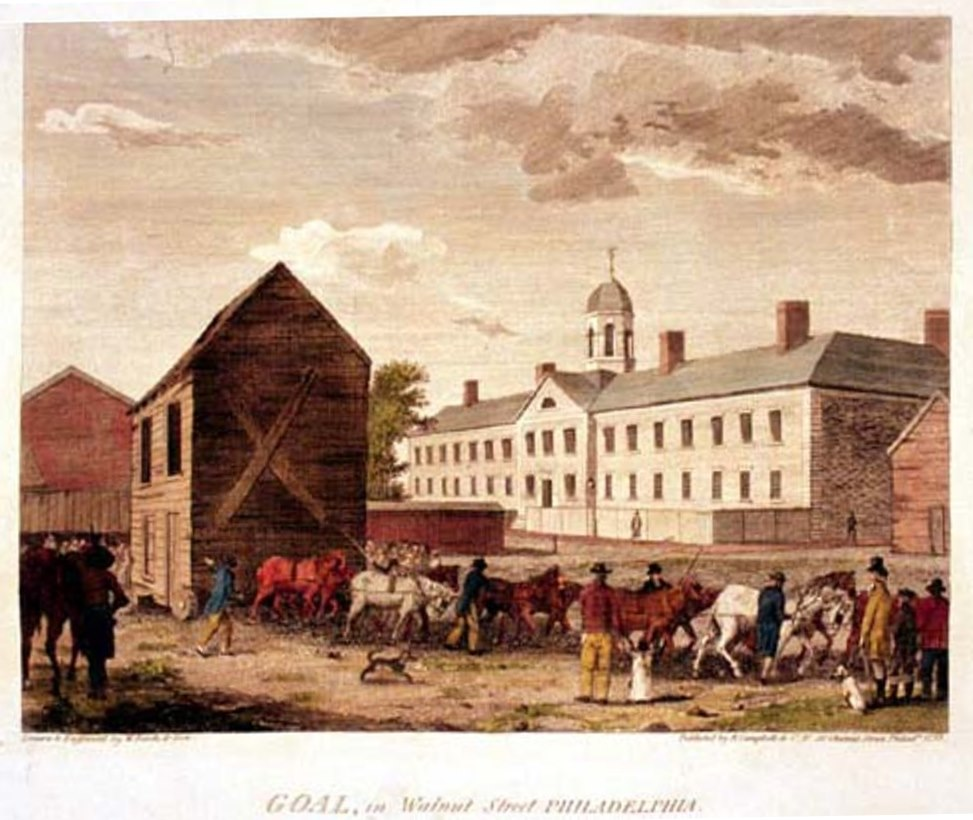
- Walnut Street Prison in Philadelphia, c. 1800
- Interactive map of Walnut Street Prison
- Location: Philadelphia, Pennsylvania, U.S.
- Opened: 1790; 236 years ago
- Closed: 1838; 188 years ago
- Former name: Walnut Street Jail

Walnut Street Prison was a city jail and penitentiary house in Philadelphia, Pennsylvania, from 1790 to 1838. Legislation calling for establishment of the jail was passed in 1773 to relieve overcrowding in the High Street Jail; the first prisoners were admitted in 1776. It was located at Sixth and Walnut Streets, where it acquired its original name Walnut Street Jail.

The penitentiary house, built in 1790, is considered to be the first in the United States, as it was built to use individual cells and work details. The word "penitentiary" came from the Pennsylvania Quakers' belief in penitence and self-examination as a means to salvation. This was made a new and permanent form of combating crime through the practice of solitary confinement, which was later adopted at the Eastern State Penitentiary.

== Background ==
In 1773, in Philadelphia, Pennsylvania, a new jail was opened to receive the overcrowded prisoners of High Street Jail. It was located on Walnut Street, from which its name was based, on a lot bounded by Sixth and Prune at present-day Locust Street.

== Architecture ==
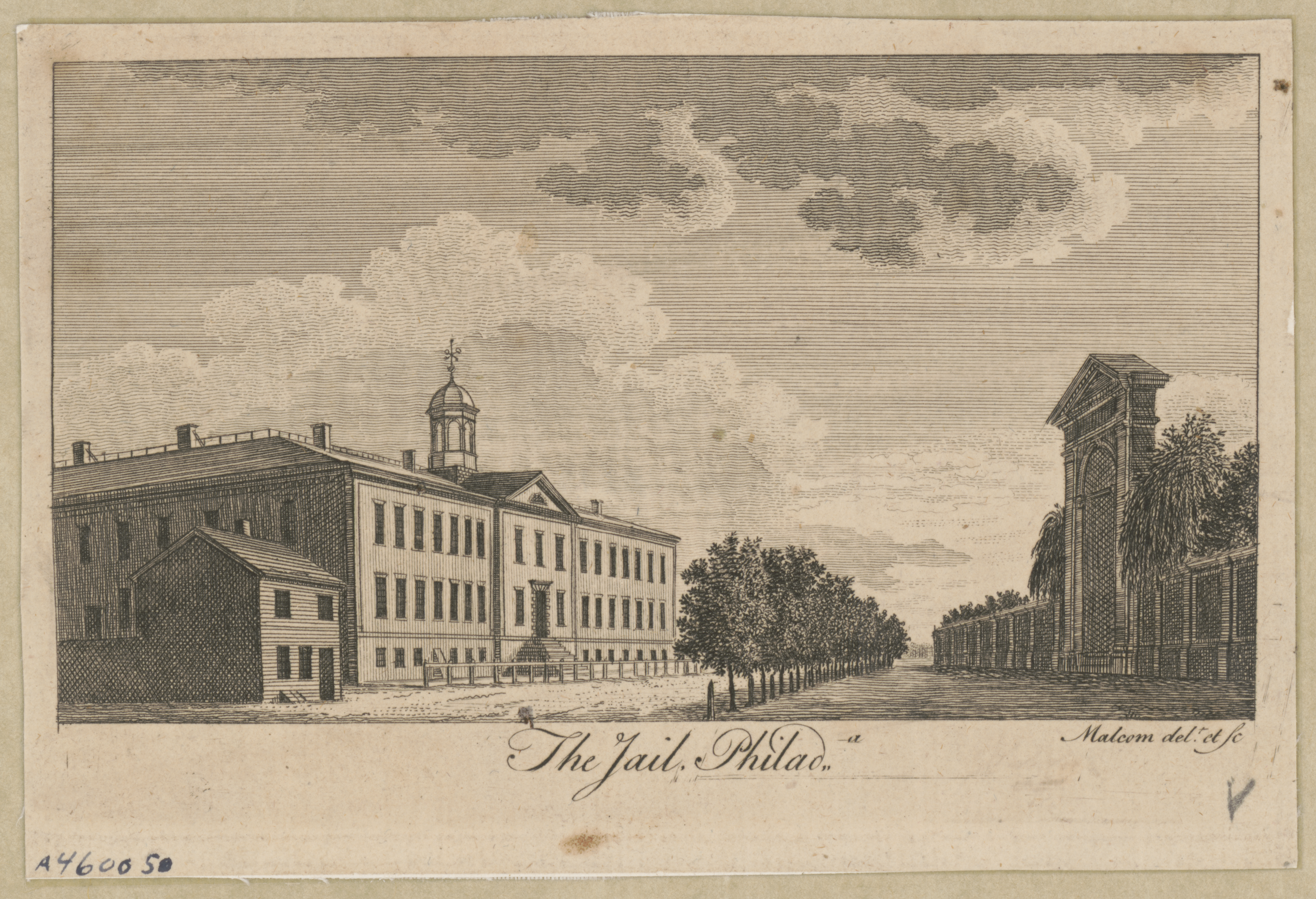
James Peller Malcolm's 1789 illustration of Walnut Street Prison

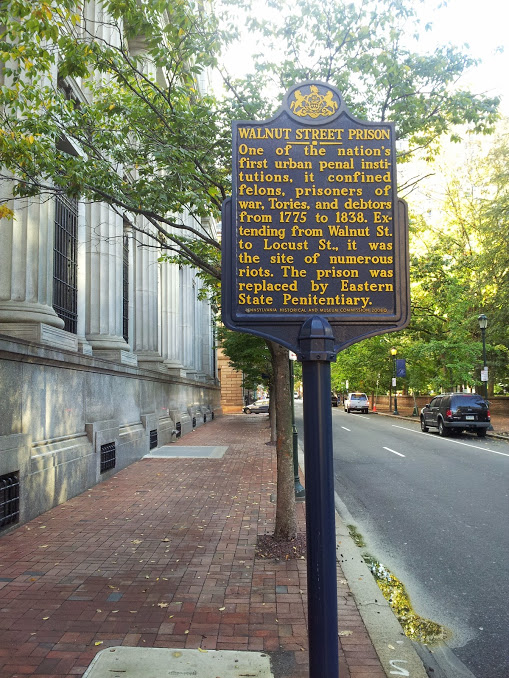
Walnut Street Prison's Pennsylvania Historical Marker at the corner of South Sixth and Walnut Streets in Center City, Philadelphia, October 2014

The jail was designed to hold groups of inmates in large rooms. It was designed by Robert Smith, a prominent Philadelphia architect. The building was in the typical U-shape designed to hold large numbers of inmates. There was little regard for their physical well-being, and none for their rehabilitation. The prison was overcrowded and dirty, and inmates attacked each other regularly.

== Balloon flight ==
The first manned balloon flight in the Western Hemisphere was made by Jean-Pierre Blanchard on January 9, 1793. He launched his balloon from the prison yard of the jail, before a crowd of spectators that included President George Washington, Vice President John Adams, Thomas Jefferson, James Madison, and James Monroe. Blanchard crossed the Delaware River and safely landed in Deptford Township, New Jersey.

== Solitary confinement ==
A new cellblock, called the "penitentiary house," was added in 1790. Built within the courtyard of the existing structure, it included a series of small cells for individual prisoners. The cells and the corridors connecting them were arranged to prevent prisoners from communicating with each other. Windows were high up (the cells had 9-foot-high (2.7 m) ceilings) and grated and louvered to prevent prisoners from looking onto the street. Each cell had a mattress, a water tap, and a privy pipe.

The Walnut Street Jail was to be converted into a penitentiary in 1790. But because of political reasons and the resistance of the jailer, John Reynolds, the transformation did not occur till 1795. As a penitentiary, solitary confinement was the goal, but such facilities were only available for about a third of those admitted. Other prisoners were made to sleep naked in a common room. Overcrowding undermined the goal of solitary confinement of serious offenders, and more than one inmate was placed in each cell. The isolation had a terrible psychological effect on inmates.

Eventually inmates were given in-cell piecework on which they worked up to eight hours a day. Despite these difficulties, similar institutions were constructed at Newgate Prison in New York City in 1797 and in Trenton, New Jersey in 1798.

== Notable inmates ==
- Ann Carson - attempted to kidnap the Governor of Pennsylvania in 1816 to force him to pardon her imprisoned bigamist husband who had killed her first husband.
- Patrick Lyon - falsely imprisoned at the jail after the 1798 Bank of Pennsylvania heist.
