= James Rees =

American dramatist

James Rees (1802–1885), known by the pseudonym Colley Cibber in reference to the 18th-century dramatist, was an American writer, playwright, and editor.

== Biography ==
Rees was born in Norristown, Pennsylvania. He worked as a salesman, and as a clerk for the United States Post Office in Philadelphia, Pennsylvania.

Rees was co-editor of the Mechanics' Free Press, 1831; and editor of The Dramatic Mirror, 1842; and of The Philanthropist, 1854. He was closely involved with the Home Missionary Society of the City and County of Philadelphia, a Christian evangelist organization.

In 1849 he published the short story "A Christmas Legend", containing the first mention of Mrs. Santa Claus.

He and his wife Anna were the parents of four children, the first two of whom were born in their mother's home state of Louisiana.

James Rees died in Philadelphia on April 29, 1885.

== Bibliography ==
=== Books ===
- The Beauties of the Hon. Daniel Webster; Selected and arranged, with a critical essay on his genius and writings, 1839.
- The Dwarf, a Dramatic Poem, 1839.
- The Dramatic Authors of America, 1842.
- Mysteries of City Life; or, Leaves from the World's Book, 1849.
- The Tinker Spy: A Romance of the Revolution, 1855.
- Foot-Prints from a Letter Carrier; or, A History of the World's Correspondence, 1866.
- The Life of Edwin Forrest, 1874.
- Shakespeare and the Bible, 1876.

=== Plays ===
- The Headsman
- Washington at Valley Forge
- Changes
- Marion
- Pat Lyon
- Anthony Wayne
