= William Potts Dewees =

American physician

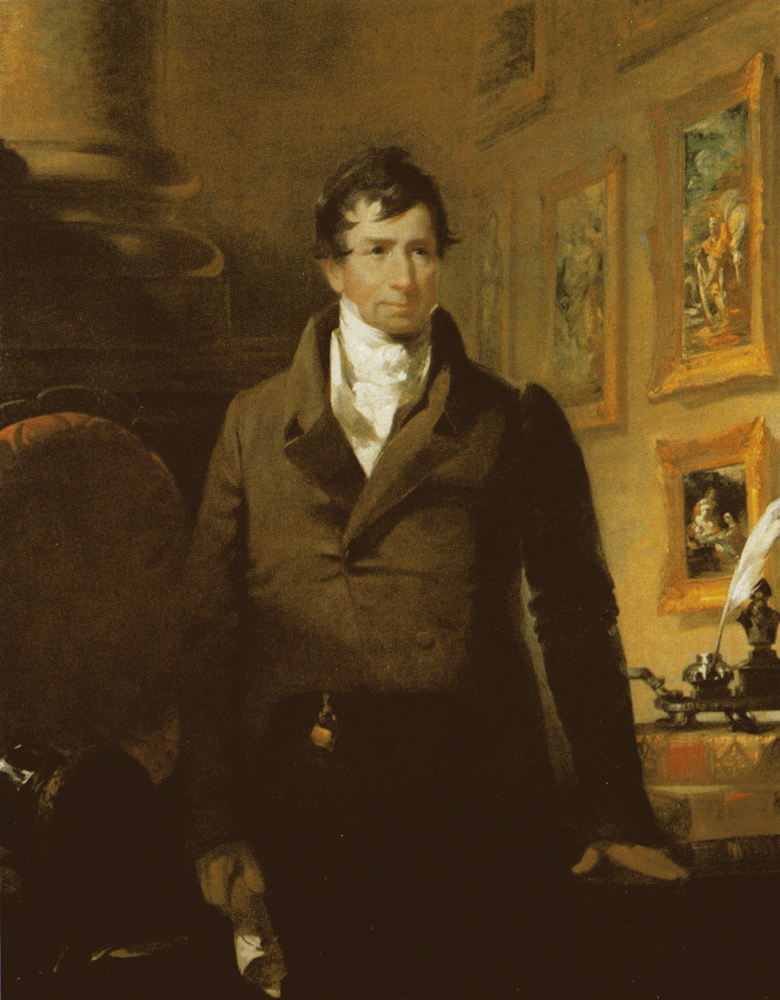
Dewees circa. 1833, portrait by John Neagle

William Potts Dewees (May 5, 1768 – May 18, 1841) was an American medical doctor, best known for his work in obstetrics, being described in American Medical Biographies as a "Philadelphian obstetrician [that] was so famous that no parturient woman of the time considered herself safe in other hands."

Dewees received a Bachelor of Medicine and in 1806 an M.D. from the Department of Medicine at the University of Pennsylvania, where he would become Professor of Obstetrics, and Chair of Obstetrics from 1834 to 1841. In 1819, Dewees was elected to the American Philosophical Society. His fame comes mainly from three books published in quick succession in the mid-1820s, each of which went to at least ten editions: Compendious System of Midwifery (1824), Treatise on the Physical and Medical Treatment of Children (1825), and Treatise on the Diseases of Females (1826). Of these, the System of Midwifery had the most lasting influence, introducing ideas from British and continental European physicians (especially Jean-Louis Baudelocque) and becoming the standard reference on obstetrics in the United States for a time.

== Works ==
- An essay on the means of lessening pain, and facilitating certain cases of difficult parturition (1806)
- Compendious System of Midwifery (1824)
- Treatise on the Physical and Medical Treatment of Children (1825)
- Treatise on the Diseases of Females (1826)
- Practice of Medicine (1830)
