= Mrs. Claus =

Wife of Santa Claus

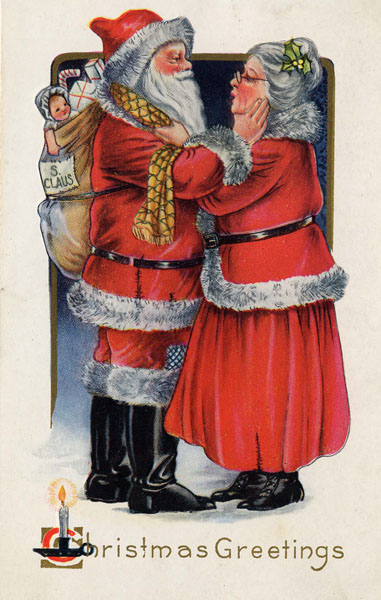
- Illustration from a 1919 postcard depicting Mrs. Claus (right) placing a scarf on Santa before his journey begins
- Associates: Elves; reindeer
- Attire: Mrs. Claus suit; long petticoat; lace cap

In-universe information
- Aliases: Mrs. Santa Claus; Mrs. Santa; Mother Christmas; Mrs. Christmas; Mary Claus; Mary Christmas
- Gender: Female
- Spouse: Santa Claus
- Home: North Pole (Santa's workshop); Lapland (Santa Claus Village)

Mrs. Claus (Note: Also known as Mrs. Santa Claus, Mrs. Santa, Mother Christmas, Mrs. Christmas, or colloquially as Mary Claus and Mary Christmas.) is the legendary wife of Santa Claus, the traditional Christmas gift-bringer in Western folklore. In popular depictions, she resides with Santa at the North Pole and is typically characterized as an elderly, grandmotherly figure who assists in holiday preparations, manages the domestic household, and oversees the elves.

The character first appeared in print in the 1849 short story "A Christmas Legend" by Philadelphia author James Rees. Over the following decades, she made recurring appearances across American periodicals and children's literature, often depicted assisting Santa or keeping the ledger of good and bad children. Her active role was significantly popularized by Katharine Lee Bates in her 1889 poem "Goody Santa Claus on a Sleigh Ride", which gave the character a distinct voice and agency.

Throughout the 20th and 21st centuries, Mrs. Claus became a recurring figure in popular culture, appearing in holiday music, television specials, and feature films. While historically portrayed in supporting domestic roles, later commercial and media adaptations have increasingly depicted her as an independent character and a central figure in Christmas traditions.

== Origins ==
The wife of Santa Claus is first mentioned in the short story "A Christmas Legend" (1849), by James Rees, a Philadelphia playwright and author. In the story, an old man and woman carrying bundles on their backs are given shelter on Christmas Eve as weary travelers. The next morning, the children find an abundance of gifts, and the couple is revealed to be not "old Santa Claus and his wife", but the hosts' long-lost elder daughter and her husband in disguise.

Mrs. Santa Claus was first mentioned by name in the December 1851 issue of the Yale Literary Magazine, in which a student author credited her with helping Santa dress in his "indescribably fantastic" holiday attire. Subsequent passing references appeared in an 1854 account of a Christmas musical at the State Lunatic Asylum in Utica, New York (where a dancing Mrs. Claus appeared with a baby in arms), and in an 1862 essay in Harper's Magazine. In Robert St. Clar's comic novel The Metropolites (1864), she appears in a woman's dream wearing Hessian high boots, a dozen red petticoats, and a large straw bonnet, bringing a selection of finery to wear.

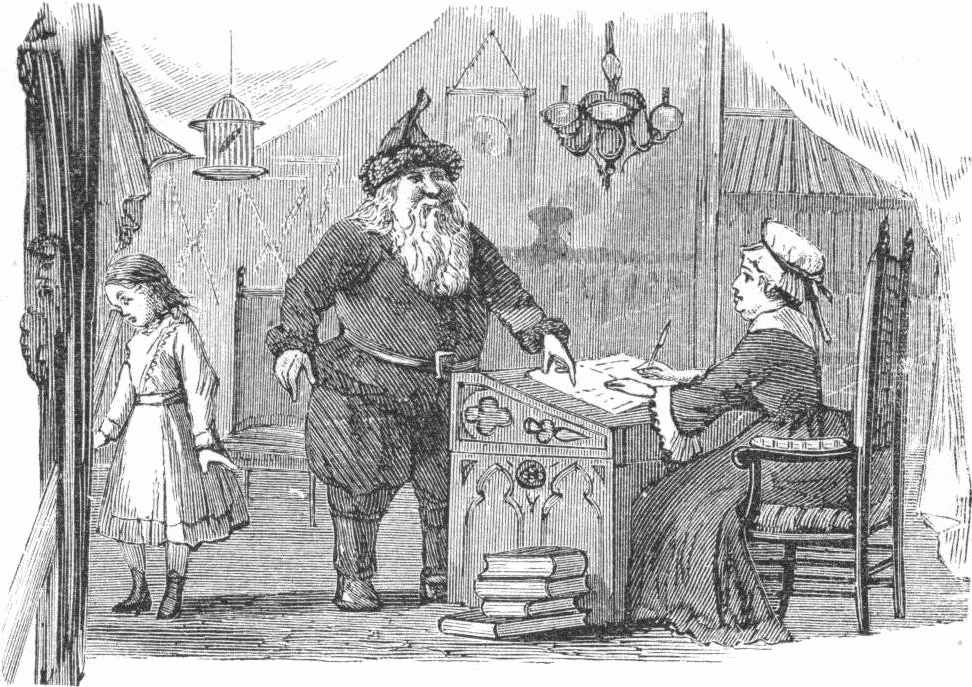
The keeper of the naughty-or-nice ledger in "Lill's Travels in Santa Claus Land", 1878

In the 1878 children's book Lill's Travels in Santa Claus Land, and Other Stories by Ellis Towne, Sophie May, and Ella Farman, Santa's office features a lady seated at a golden desk recording children's good and bad deeds in a ledger while Santa observes them through a telescope. Later in the story, Lill's sister speculates whether the desk clerk was Mrs. Santa Claus.

Mrs. Claus was given a detailed visual depiction in an 1887 Good Housekeeping essay by architect Eugene C. Gardner. Appearing in the author's dream as a "keen and nervous, but benignant" figure dressed in a voluminous plaid worsted cloak and a beehive-like corrugated red hood, she instructs the narrator on the design of an ideal modern kitchen.

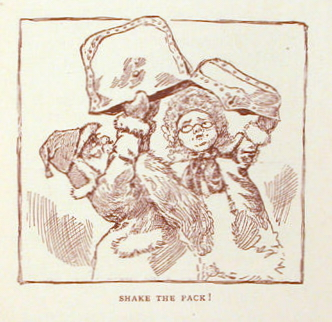
Illustration from Goody Santa Claus on a Sleigh-Ride, 1889

Santa Claus' wife made her most active appearance yet by Katharine Lee Bates in her poem "Goody Santa Claus on a Sleigh Ride" (1889). (Note: Although Restad gives the publication year as 1899, most sources record that the poem was published in 1889.) "Goody" is short for "Goodwife", i.e., "Mrs."

== 20th century ==
The character recurred throughout mass media of the time, with notable literary examples including the 1914 one-act play Mrs. Santa Claus, Militant by Bell Elliott Palmer, the 1923 story The Great Adventure of Mrs. Santa Claus by Sarah Addington illustrated by Gertrude Kay, and the 1963 children's book How Mrs. Santa Claus Saved Christmas by Phyllis McGinley.

In popular recordings, Nat King Cole released the 1953 song "Mrs. Santa Claus" with accompaniment by Nelson Riddle's orchestra (Capitol Records single F2616), while comedy duo Cheech & Chong had a hit with "Santa Claus and His Old Lady" in 1971.

On television, Mrs. Claus was voiced by Shirley Booth in the 1974 stop-action animated special The Year Without a Santa Claus. In the 1992 animated special It's Christmastime Again, Charlie Brown, Charlie Brown tells his sister Sally that some people refer to Santa's wife as "Mary Christmas", prompting Sally to write her a letter congratulating her on keeping her own surname. In 1996, Angela Lansbury portrayed the character in the title role of the live-action musical television film Mrs. Santa Claus.

== 21st century ==
Boost Mobile created some controversy with a 2009 ad featuring Mrs. Claus. British company Marks & Spencer received positive attention for their 2016 marketing campaign based on a modern feminist interpretation of Mrs. Claus. In 2018, there was an increasing demand for holiday appearances of Mrs. Claus as a standalone character separate from Santa Claus.

In 2023, Sheryl Lee Ralph became the first celebrity and the first black woman to play Mrs. Claus in the history of the Macy's Thanksgiving Day Parade.

== See also ==
- Santa Claus' daughter
