= John Neagle =

American painter (1796–1865)

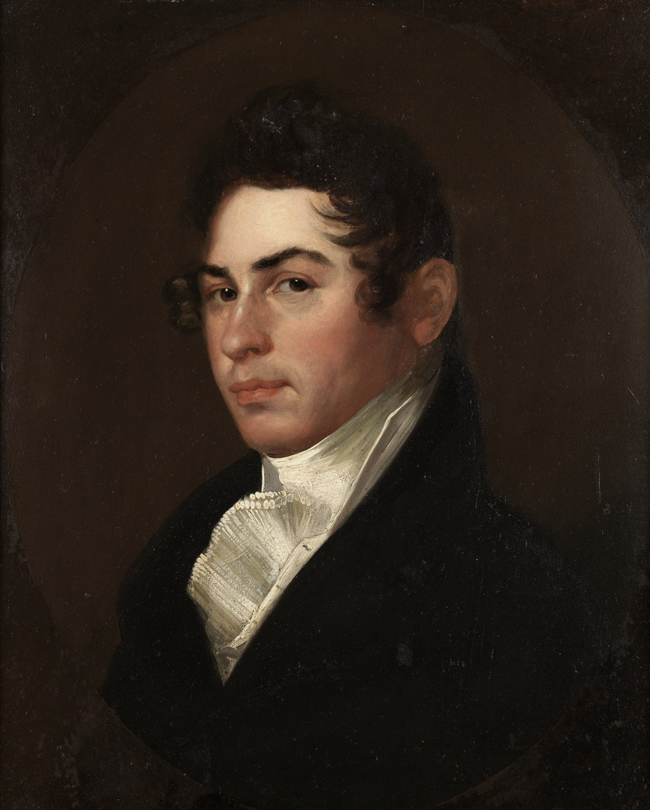
- John Neagle by Bass Otis, c. 1815
- Born: John B. Neagle; November 4, 1796; Boston, Massachusetts, US
- Died: September 17, 1865 (aged 68); Philadelphia, Pennsylvania, US
- Notable work: Pat Lyon at the Forge; Portraits of Joseph Philmpre, Henry Clay

John Neagle (November 4, 1796 – September 17, 1865) was a fashionable American painter, primarily of portraits, during the first half of the 19th century in Philadelphia.

== Biography ==
Neagle was born in Boston, Massachusetts. His training in art began with instruction from the drawing-master Pietro Ancora and an apprenticeship to Thomas Wilson, a well-connected painter of signs and coaches in Philadelphia. Wilson introduced him to the painters Bass Otis and Thomas Sully, and Neagle became a protégé of the latter. In 1818 Neagle decided to concentrate exclusively on portraits, setting up shop as an independent master.

Aside from brief sojourns in Lexington, Kentucky, and New Orleans, Louisiana, he spent his career in Philadelphia, Pennsylvania, where he died. In May 1826 he married Sully's stepdaughter Mary, and for a time the son-in-law and father-in-law dominated the field of portraiture in the city. Neagle served as Director of the Pennsylvania Academy of the Fine Arts, and was also a founder and president (1835–43) of the Artist's Fund Society of Philadelphia.

== Works ==
Neagle's sitters included society figures, politicians, professionals and merchants, all of whom he treated with an incisive attention to psychology and an often dazzling brushwork derived (by way of Sully and Sir Thomas Lawrence) ultimately from van Dyck. His most impressive works are, arguably, the full-length allegorical Portrait of Henry Clay (Union League, Philadelphia), and the unconventional and brutally heroic Pat Lyon at the Forge (Pennsylvania Academy of the Fine Arts). The latter reached a much wider audience after it was engraved by Thomas Kelly and published in The Atlantic Souvenir annual gift book volume for 1832.

Other Neagle sitters included Vice President Richard Mentor Johnson, Governor John Jordan Crittenden of Kentucky, Congressman James Harper and his wife Charlotte, the Marquis de Lafayette, Bishop William Meade, Dr. William Potts Dewees, author James Fenimore Cooper, fellow painter Gilbert Stuart, actor Edwin Forrest and the architects William Strickland, John Haviland and Thomas Ustick Walter as well as Pawnee Indian and hero of the whites Petalesharo. His papers are housed at the Historical Society of Pennsylvania, which hosted a retrospective exhibition of his work in 1989 (with scholarly catalogue by Robert Torchia).

Sixteen paintings of actors in character by Neagle are housed in the library at The Players in New York City.

== Gallery ==
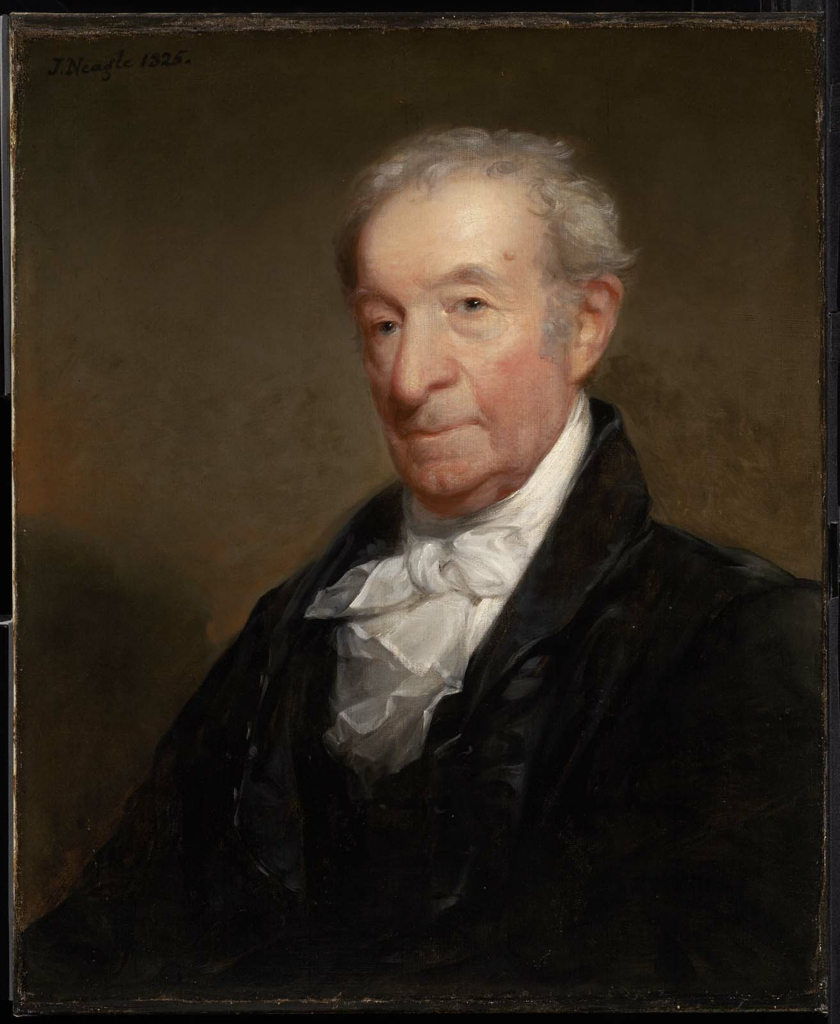
Gilbert Stuart; 1825, Museum of Fine Arts, Boston

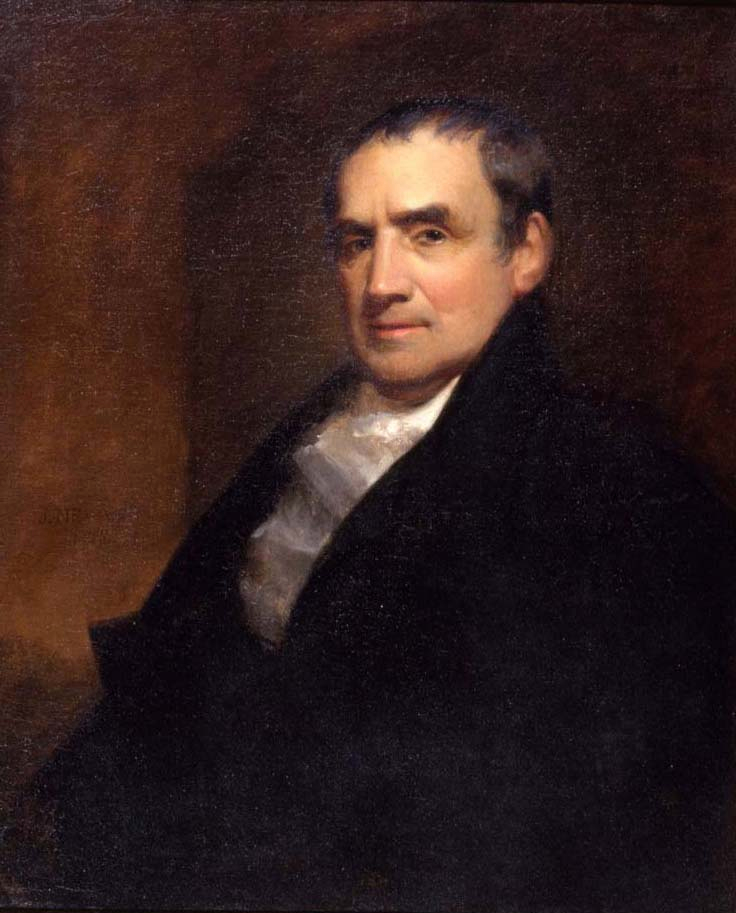
Mathew Carey, 1825

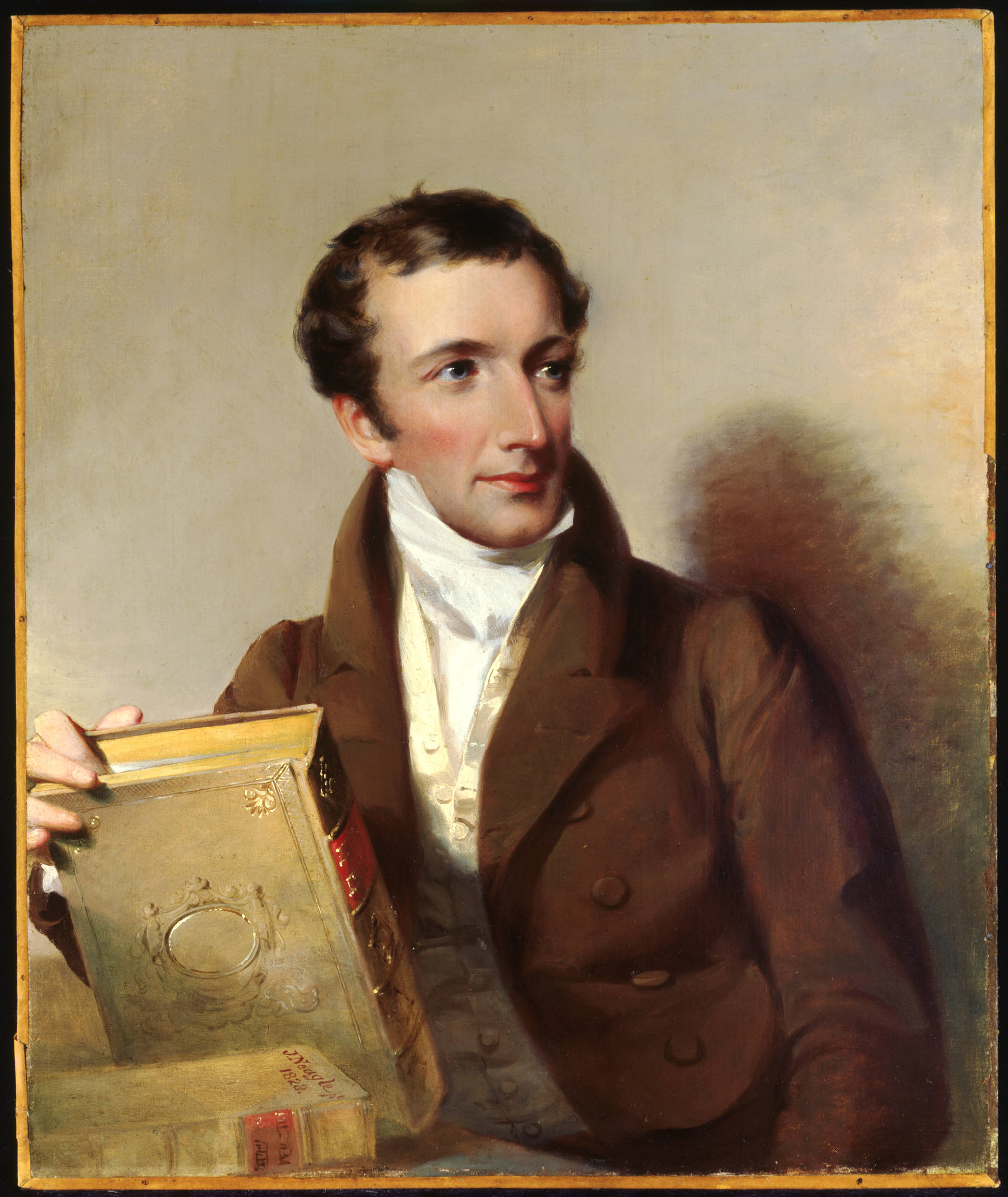
John Kintzing Kane, 1828, Princeton University Art Museum

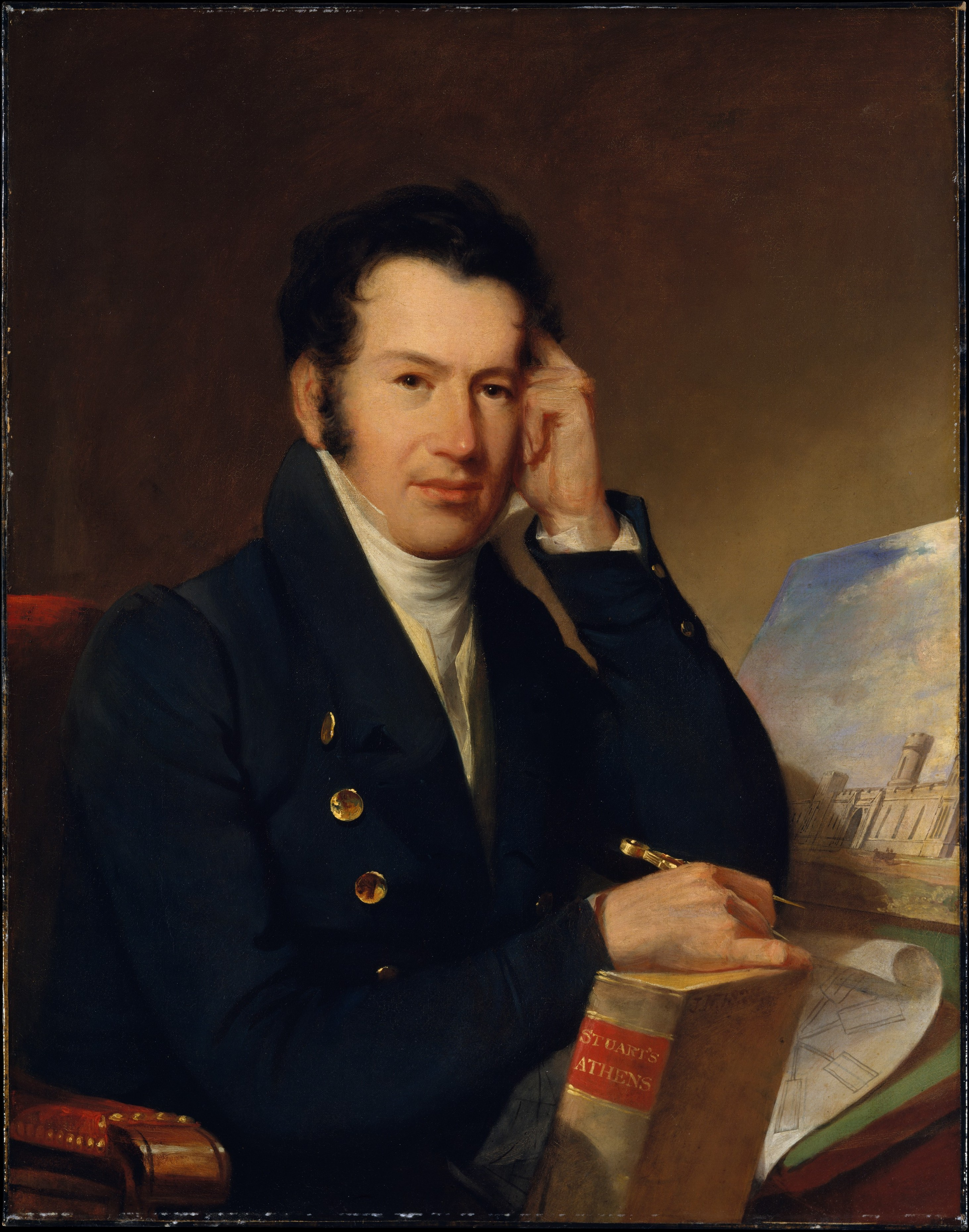
John Haviland 1828, Metropolitan Museum of Art

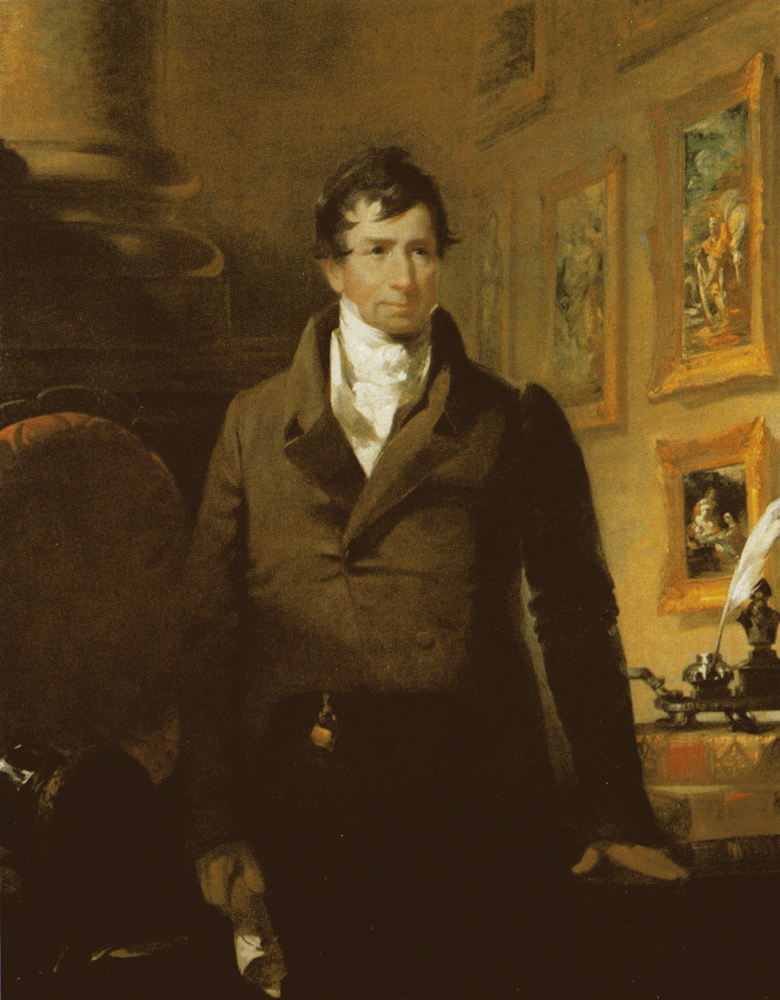
Dr. William Potts Dewees, 1833, University of Pennsylvania

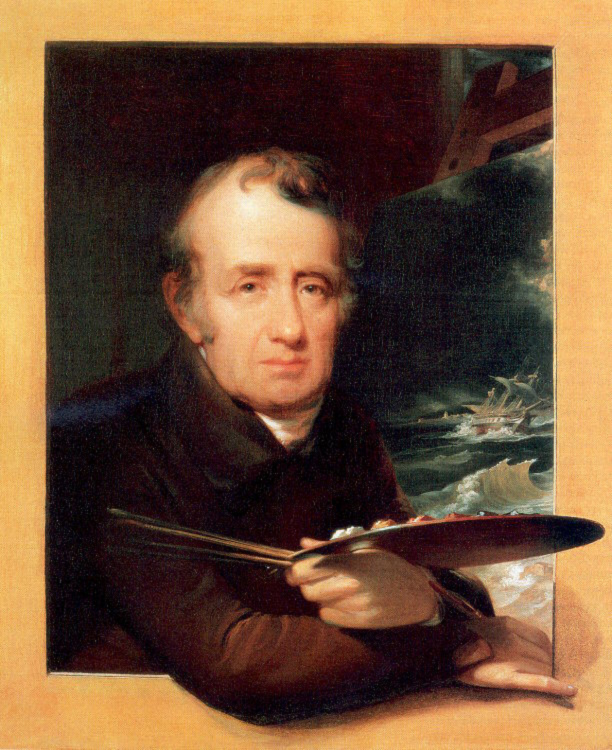
The Studious Artist: Portrait of Thomas Birch 1836, Pennsylvania Academy of the Fine Arts

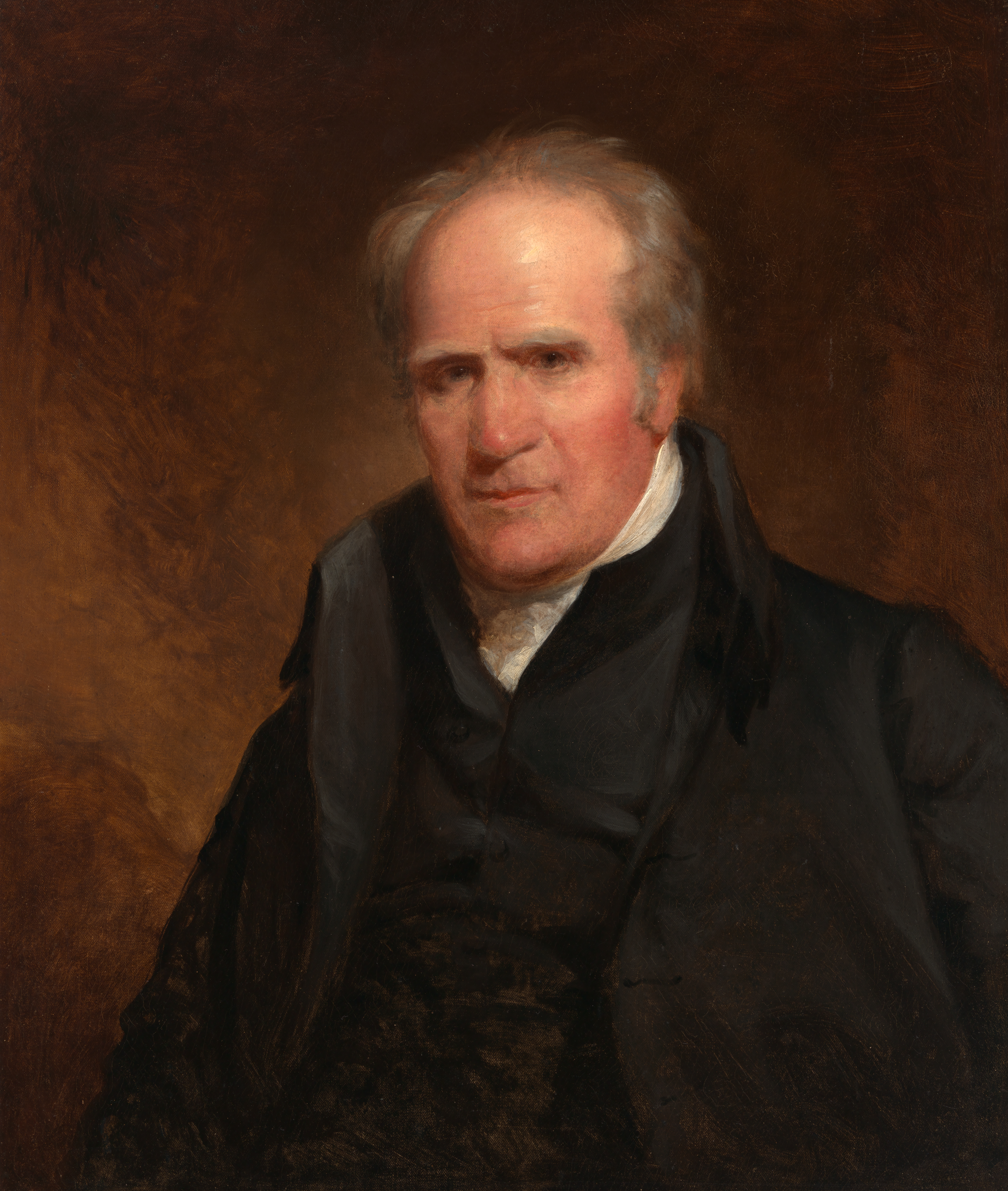
Robert Richford Roberts, 1840, National Portrait Gallery

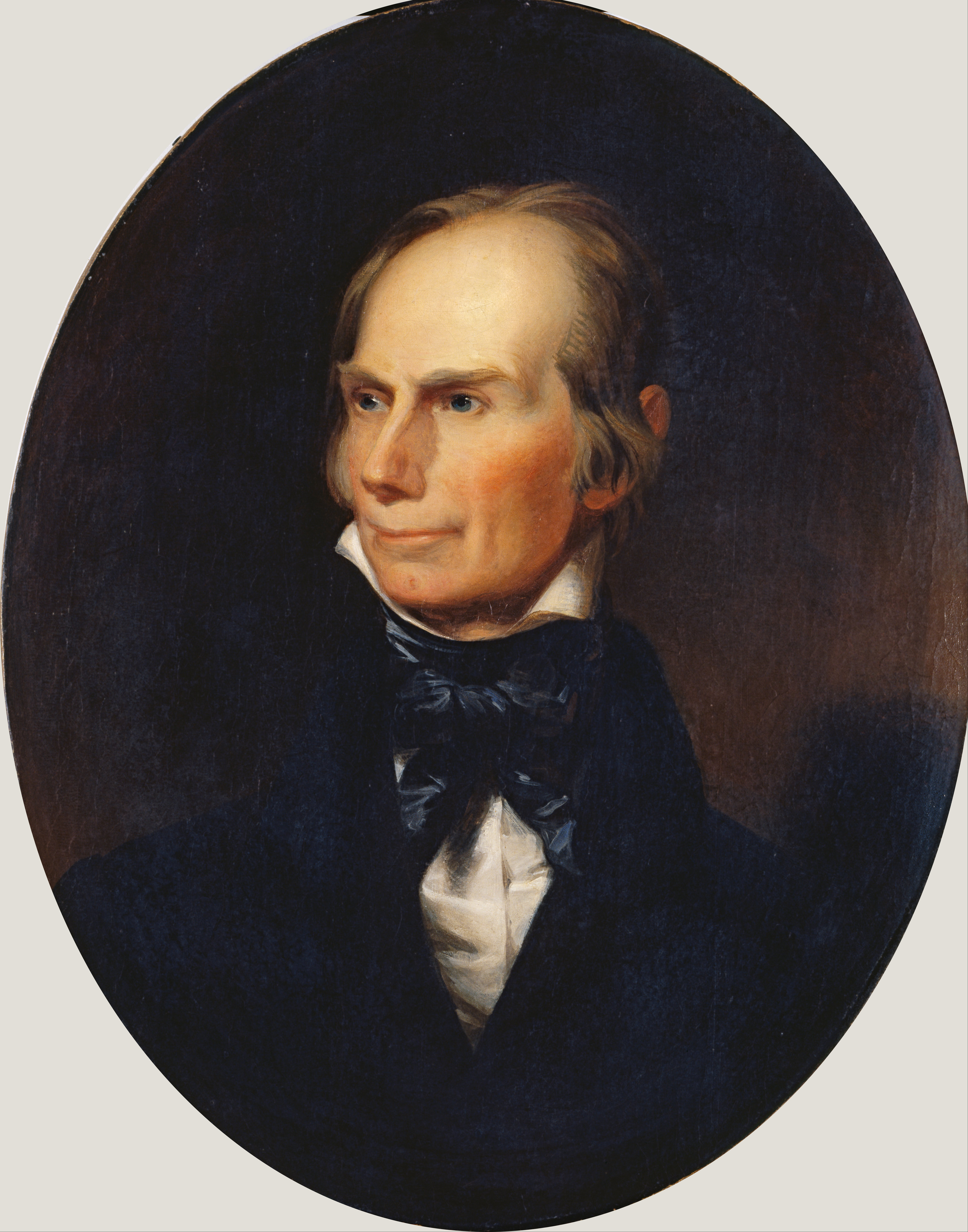
Henry Clay 1842, National Portrait Gallery

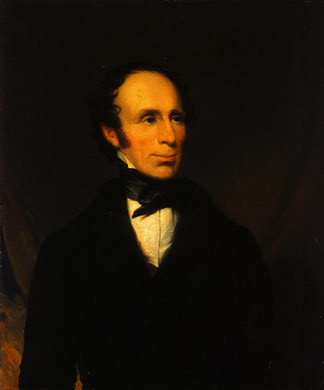
George Dodd, c. 1852, National Gallery of Art, Washington, DC

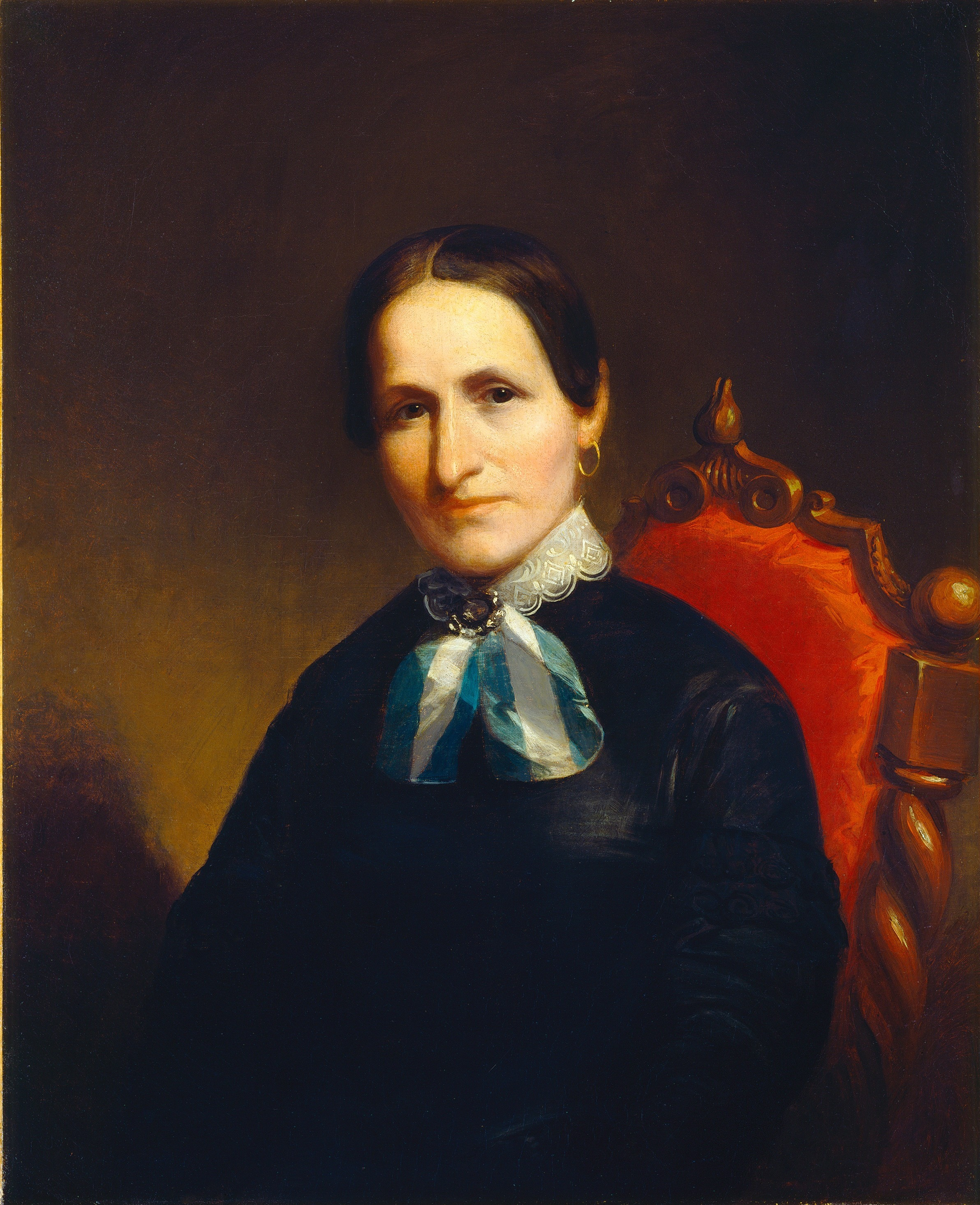
Julia Dodd (Mrs. George Dodd), c. 1852, National Gallery of Art, Washington, DC

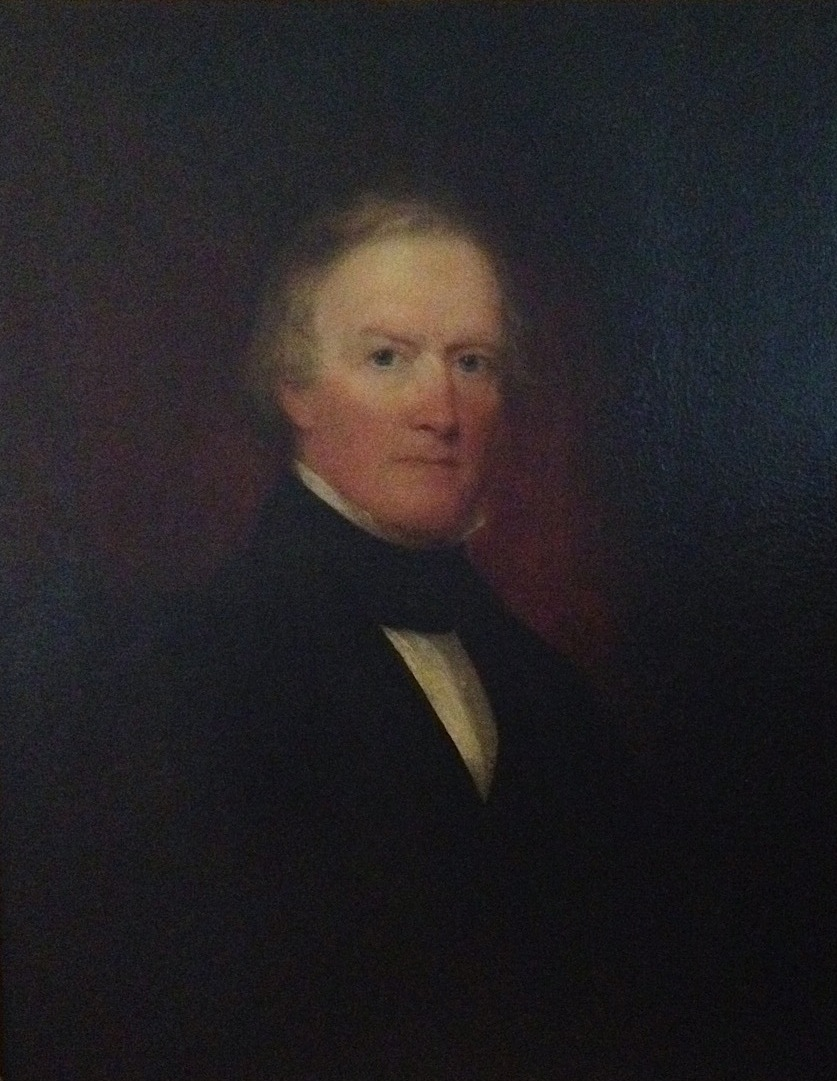
Portrait of a gentleman in black. Private collection
