= Ann Carson =

American criminal

Ann Carson (born Ann Baker) (c. 1785–1824) was an early nineteenth-century American criminal who was described by biographers as "the most captivating beauty of the underworld and the most notorious character in the State" of Pennsylvania. Initially charged and acquitted of the murder of her ex-husband, she was later sentenced to Philadelphia's Walnut Street Prison for a plot to kidnap Pennsylvania Governor Simon Snyder. Incarcerated a second time for counterfeiting, she died of typhoid fever in the prison in 1824. She also operated a clothing workshop and a china shop in Philadelphia, and the publications of her memoirs made her a well-known figure in the city's early nineteenth-century print culture.

The 1822 publication of her memoir The History of the Celebrated Mrs. Ann Carson, and 1838 publication of The Memoirs of the Celebrated and Beautiful Mrs. Ann Carson, cemented her fame.

== Biography ==
=== Early life ===
Born Ann Baker in about 1785, she lived a privileged life early on. Her father worked successfully in the mercantile trade, allowing Ann to receive one of the better educations available to girls in Philadelphia. In her memoir, Carson describes herself as popular with teachers and peers. She also recounts a sharp decline in the family's financial stability when her father left the business, forcing major changes in household expenses. This was a major shift from financial security to poverty for Ann. One that would shape her sense of independence and resilience.

=== Marriage ===
She was married off at about age 15 to the much older Captain John Carson due to the financial distress of her parents. John Carson was a former captain in the U.S. Navy who had served with her father. John was described by Ann as an abusive alcoholic who had childish fits during the short periods he spent at home with Ann. Seeing as John was a captain, he frequently left home for long periods of time, and Ann shared in her memoir that she would find herself spending time with her many male friends, as she did not enjoy spending time with other women. She explains these friendships with these men as honorable; however, the public labeled Ann as “promiscuous” and even stated she was a prostitute. When her husband returned home and heard the news, his jealousy led to an increase in drinking, which led to their marriage deteriorating further.

=== Life as a businesswoman ===
In 1812, John wrote Ann a letter stating he would be gone for a long period of time and was likely not returning. For roughly four years, Ann had not heard anything except that her husband had died in a hospital in Russia. Ann was left as the sole guardian of her and Captain Carson’s three young sons, and was hopeful and determined to provide for herself and her family. She started using her sewing skills and opened a home-based clothing shop. Her employees were all women, whom she hired to live with her and help sew.

After almost a year with Captain Carson gone, Ann developed entrepreneurial plans. She sold all of her husband's furniture and china, bought a house on Second Street, and started selling china and queensware. Her shop was located in a male-dominated commercial environment, which she reported made her a little uneasy, as well as navigating public life. In her memoir, Ann discusses very little social prejudice aside from the skepticism she received from her own parents. Her father initially opposed the idea of his daughter involving herself in trade.

=== Killing of Captain Carson ===
Ann took up with Lieutenant Richard Smith, and married him in October 1815. Carson later wrote that she was content during the brief three months of her marriage to Smith until Captain Carson returned home and demanded his ownership of Ann, as well as her business and property. After some time of strife, Smith shot Captain Carson on an evening in January 1816, and he died from his injuries a few weeks later.

At trial, Smith was convicted of murder despite a plea and some evidence of self-defense since the law stated a marriage could be annulled if abandoned for a minimum of two years, and Ann Carson was acquitted. Once again, Philadelphia was gossiping about Ann Carson. Carson then set about trying to save Smith from execution, first pleading for a pardon, and then planned to kidnap Alderman Alexander Binns as a hostage to trade for Smith, but that plan failed. Then she planned to kidnap Binns' six-year-old son, but the plan was leaked and the boy kept home to foil the plot.

Carson then planned to kidnap the governor in July 1816, Simon Snyder, aiming to threaten to kill him if he didn't pardon Smith. She recruited two accomplices, "Lige" Brown and Henry Way, for the task. On the night of the attempted kidnapping, July 10, 1816, a relative of Smith was able to get word to John Binns, editor of the Democratic Press, who conveyed the plot to the Governor at his home in Selinsgrove, who then fled to Harrisburg. Way escaped jail and was never caught. Smith was executed on August 10, 1816. Carson was then arrested as an accessory to a burglary and counterfeiting. Joseph Reed, the man who convicted Ann, stated that her crimes were horrible to commit for any gender, and the court shared that this was a prime example that women were just as dangerous as any man could be. Historians have noted that Carson’s case challenged contemporary assumptions about women’s capacity for violence and criminal agency, which was made evident when the number of female inmates under thirty surged from 59 percent to 93 percent.

=== Release and public persona ===
Ann was released from prison in 1822 when the court declared there was little proof behind her crimes other than the never-ending rumors about her. After hearing the never-ending stories published in those six years, she resolved to write a book about her life, thinking it would be "a very saleable book," and which it proved to be. Sales were a valid concern for Ann at this time. Prison rules restricted family visits for inmates convicted of serious crimes. Carson described the financial strain her imprisonment placed on her children, noting that the economic consequences of incarceration were particularly severe for families already affected by war or political instability. Ann struggled with sharing her truthful version of the story of her life and the everyday lies people in the street continued to believe, and quickly realized that they needed help crafting their story so the public would understand the truth. Mary Carr Clarke, who authored poems, biographies, and even trials, was hired to help with Ann’s story, which was made into The History of the Celebrated Ann Carson.

=== Final arrest and death ===
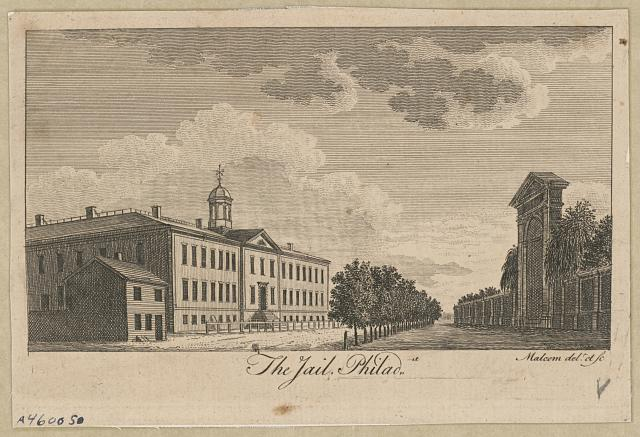
Walnut Street Prison

In 1823, Carson was arrested for passing a counterfeit note, and sentenced after a trial to seven more years in prison. During this sentence, Ann was both a victim and perpetrator of inmate violence and hatred. Ann experienced relatively better conditions than many of her fellow female inmates. Those of Irish and African descent experienced a great deal of discrimination in prison, while Anglo-American women, such as Ann, condemned them. In her own novel, Ann shared that she was different than those women as she was a refined, educated woman. Ann also shared memories of her fellow inmate being abused by the prison guards, which was common since there was no corporal punishment at this time. Ann was safe from these horrors in prison, but experienced her own form of assault. During her sentence, three of her fellow inmates were conspirators. Two of the three assaulted her, and the third is responsible for her death in 1824. She died in prison from typhoid fever on April 27.

== Publications ==
Carson published several books, including:

- The Memoirs of the Celebrated and Beautiful Mrs. Ann Carson
- The History of the Celebrated Mrs. Ann Carson

Historian Susan Branson conducted research into Ann Carson and her ghost writer and biographer. Branson later published the book Dangerous to Know: Women, Crime, and Notoriety in the Early Republic (2008, University of Pennsylvania Press: ISBN 978-0812240887) about Carson and her ghostwriter and biographer Mary Clarke.
