= Brittney Ryan =

American children's fantasy author

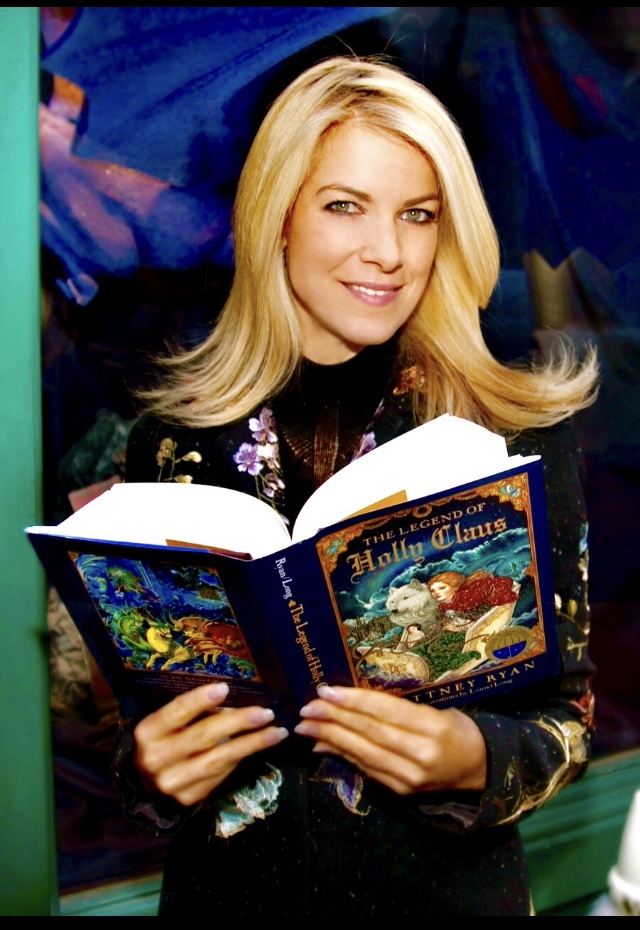
- Ryan from the book jacket of The Legend of Holly Claus
- Born: Portland, Oregon, U.S.
- Occupations: Author; storyteller; librettist; producer; composer
- Writing career
- Genre: Juvenile fantasy
- Notable work: The Legend of Holly Claus (book)

Brittney Ryan is an American New York Times bestselling author of children's fantasy novels with a Christmas theme.

== Books ==
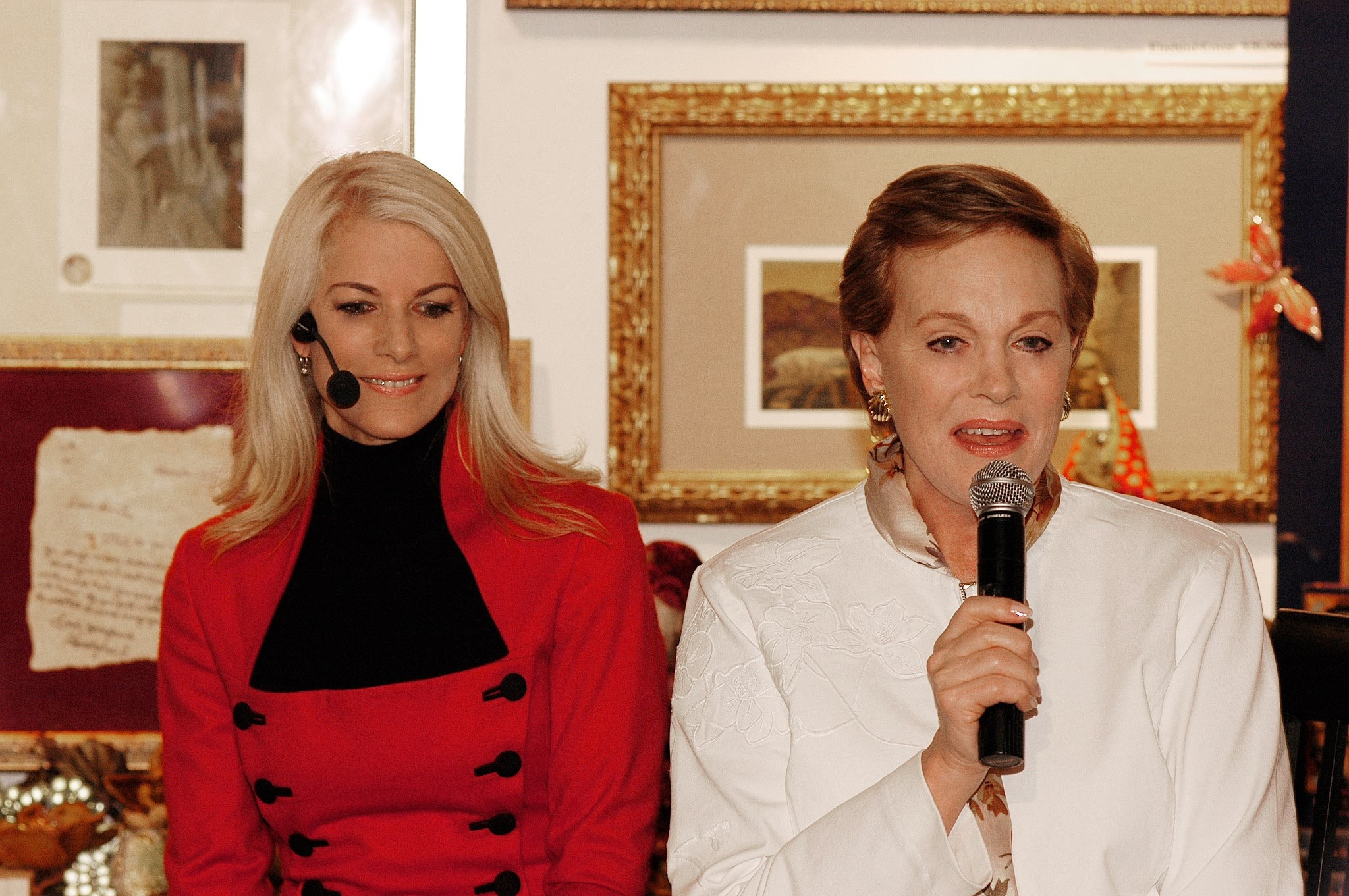
Ryan and Julie Andrews on tour, 2007

A reviewer from Publishers Weekly called The Legend of Holly Claus "a lush and leisurely Yuletide read." The debut of the Holly Claus series was published by HarperCollins as part of the Julie Andrews Collection along with children's books that were written by the actress Julie Andrews using the name Julie Andrews Edwards.

=== Series ===
==== Holly Claus ====
- The Legend of Holly Claus (novel) Julie Andrews Collection (2004)
- Holly Claus: The Christmas Princess Julie Andrews Collection (2007)

In 2015, a ballet company in Washington State presented Holly Claus: The Ballet of Dreams by Brittney Ryan . The Ballet of Dreams libretto was written by Brittney Ryan. The ballet was choreographed by Idalee Hutson-Fish.

In 2005, the United States Post Office recognized the fictionalized setting of the Holly Claus novels as an address. Children can send mail to Holly by addressing their letter to: "Holly Claus, The Royal Palace, The City of Forever, The Land of the Immortals." The Post Office has assigned The Land of Immortals its own zip code of 90209–1225. Ryan replies to the letters from the perspective of Holly Claus.

== Awards ==
Ryan is a New York Times Best Selling author and Quill Award nominee for best book of the year 2005.

== Personal life ==
Ryan is a native of Portland, Oregon.
