= The Legend of Holly Claus =

American children's Christmas fantasy novel

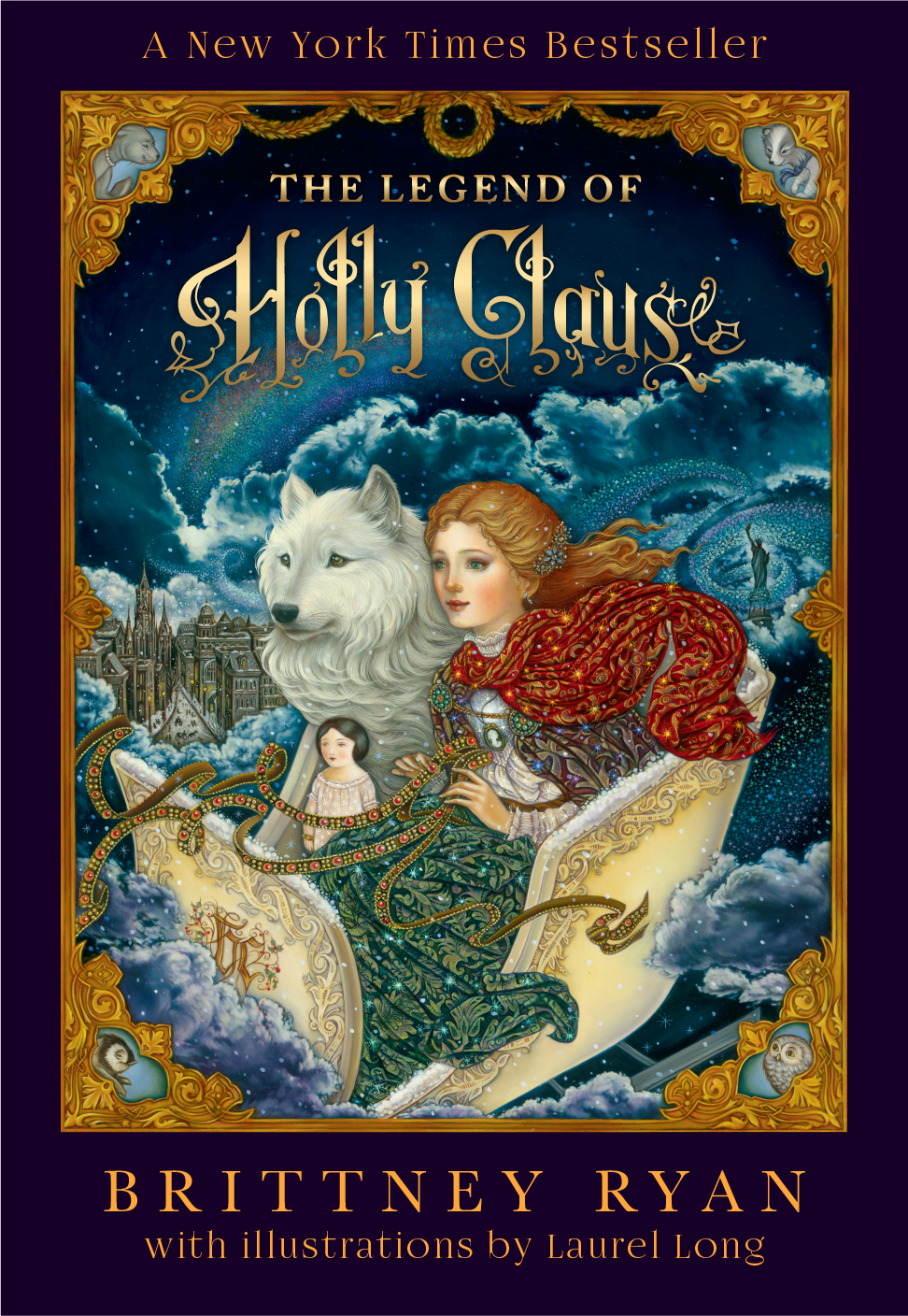
- Cover of The Legend of Holly Claus
- Author: Brittney Ryan
- Illustrator: Laurel Long
- Language: English
- Genre: Juvenile fantasy[Christmas]
- Publisher: HarperCollins
- Publication date: 2004
- Publication place: United States
- Media type: Hardback, paperback, ebook
- Pages: 544
- ISBN: 0060585153
- Website: thelegendofhollyclaus.com

The Legend of Holly Claus is a children's fantasy novel by American author Brittney Ryan published in 2004. It was originally part of the Julie Andrews Collection.

== Overview ==
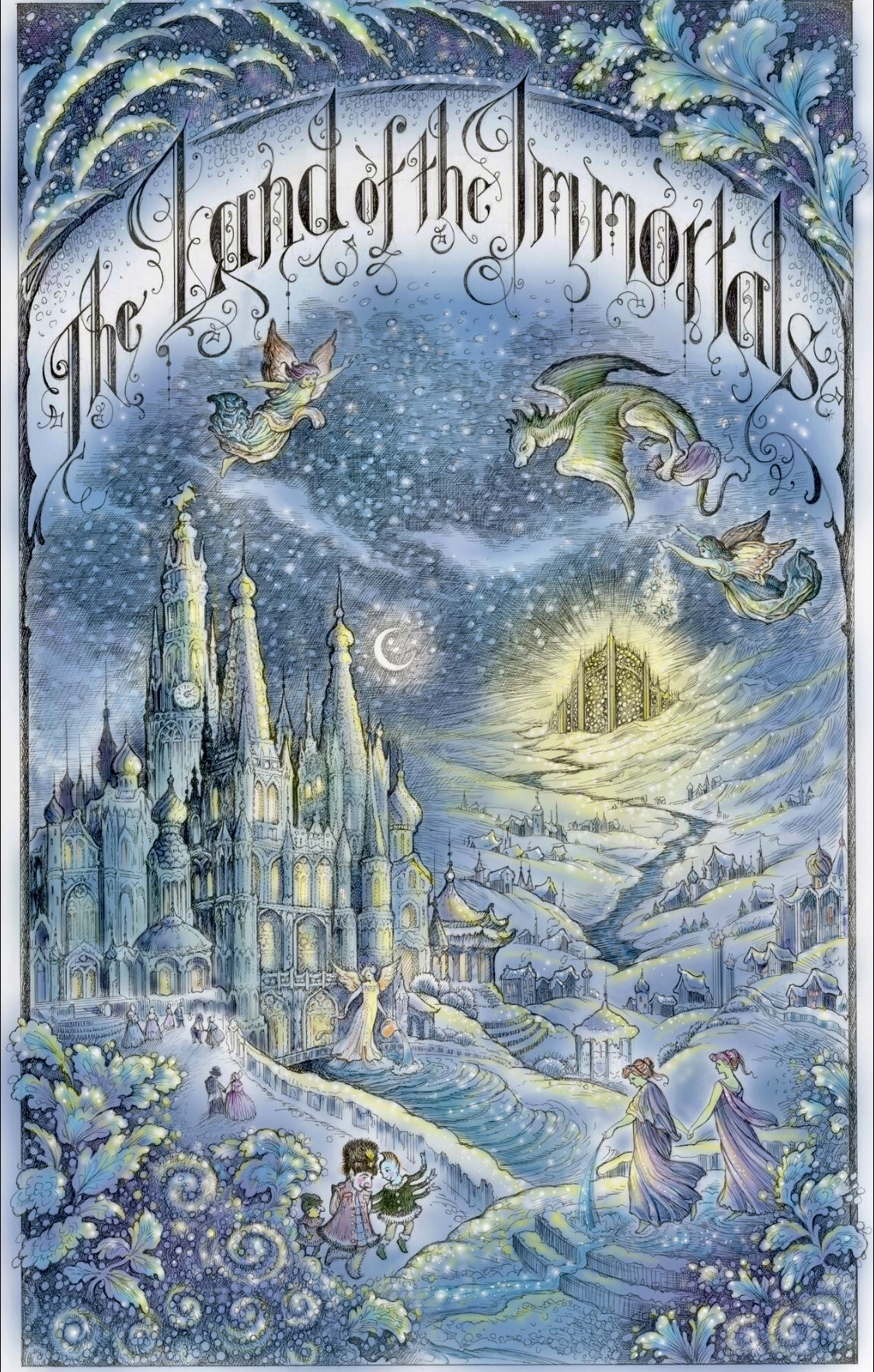
The Land of the Immortals

King Nicholas, known to the world as Santa Claus, rules the Kingdom of Forever. There, the great thinkers, artists, and inventors whose contributions to the mortal world earned them immortality continue their lives' work among fairies, fauns, and other creatures. When a young boy in the mortal world writes to give away his Christmas wish, a miracle occurs: King Nicholas and his wife are blessed with a child, Holly Claus.

== Plot ==
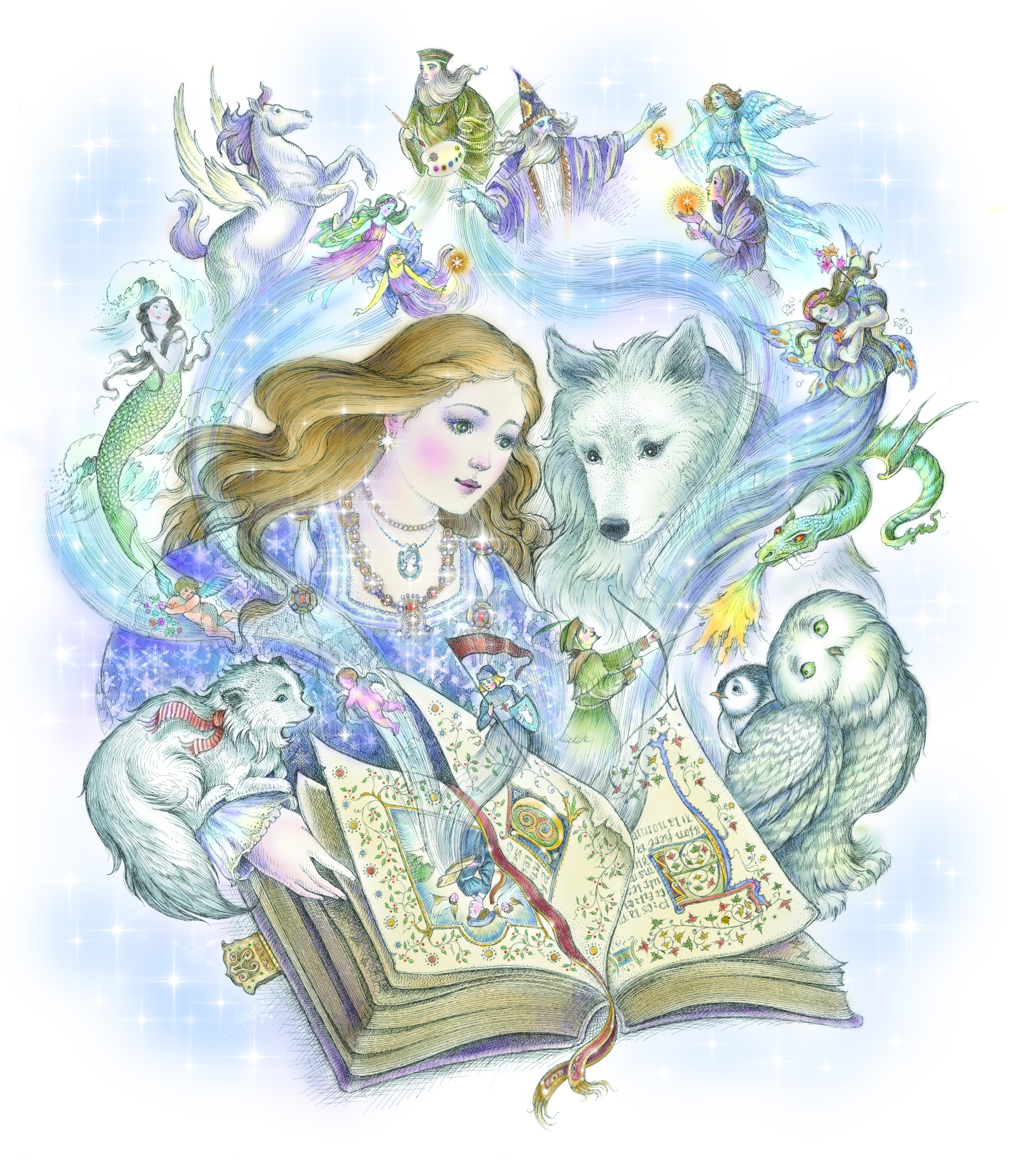
Frontispiece from the Kindle edition of The Legend of Holly Claus

The immortals and magical creatures of the Kingdom of Forever celebrate the birth of a baby princess, Holly. But at her christening, the ancient warlock Herrikhan casts a curse that sets her heart in ice and locks the gates of Forever, trapping the immortals inside.

Princess Holly grows up confined to her icy chambers to protect her frozen heart. Though tutored by such legends as Shakespeare and Michelangelo, she lives a lonely existence. For solace, she turns to art and learns to fashion beautiful dolls patterned on the mortal children she watches through her magic telescope.

The winter she turns seventeen, Holly discovers the Great Book of Forever, a book recording the contributions of all the denizens of Forever to the mortal world. She is distraught to find that her page is blank; she has contributed nothing to the mortal world. When a rare magical rainbow forms over the locked gates of Forever, presenting an opportunity to escape, she harnesses her team of magical reindeer and flies them out of the Land of Forever.

She lands in New York at the height of the Gilded Age and finds employment at a toy shop, where she makes magical dolls that reflect children's dreams. Occasionally, she catches glimpses of Christopher Carroll, the enigmatic young owner of the toy shop, and feels curiously drawn to him, but the arrival of the dashing Mr. Hunter Hartman distracts her. He sweeps her away to the opera, where she is introduced to the glittering society of the Empire City.

When he presents her with an expensive necklace and insists that she take off her protective locket to try it on, she realizes that he is Herrikhan in disguise.

She flees to the only place where she feels safe: the toy shop. Behind the formerly locked doors of Christopher Carroll's workshop, she finds an old letter from her father thanking Christopher for a precious gift. Holly realizes that Christopher is the child whose act of generosity created her eighteen years ago.

When Christopher finds her in his workshop, they share a moment and discover that they are destined to fall in love. But Herrikhan is still searching for Holly, and he casts a spell that causes summer weather to grip New York. Holly's frozen heart begins to melt.

To reach her sleigh and escape, Holly and Christopher must confront Herrikhan in Central Park. Across the city, Holly's magical dolls come to life and draw their children to the park. With their help, Holly defeats Herrikhan and unravels his spells.

With the curse broken, the gates of Forever finally open, freeing King Nicholas to fly to the mortal world with his sleigh full of gifts. Holly and Christopher are free to fly to the Kingdom of Forever.

== Characters ==
=== The Kingdom of Forever ===
Princess Holly Claus: The first child born in the Kingdom of Forever. She has the power to see what children dream to be, and she uses her magical dollmaking skills to inspire them to follow their dreams. Because of the curse cast upon her when she was an infant, she must be kept cold or her heart will melt.

King Nicholas: Also known as Father Christmas or Santa Claus. King Nicholas rules the Kingdom of Forever.

Sofya: A wise and ancient patroness of Russia who acts as Holly's mentor.

Tundra: A white wolf who serves as King Nicholas's chamberlain and Holly's protector.

Herrikhan: An evil warlock who can only escape his magical prison if he comes to possess a heart of true compassion. He freezes Holly's heart in ice to preserve it for himself.

=== New York, 1890 ===
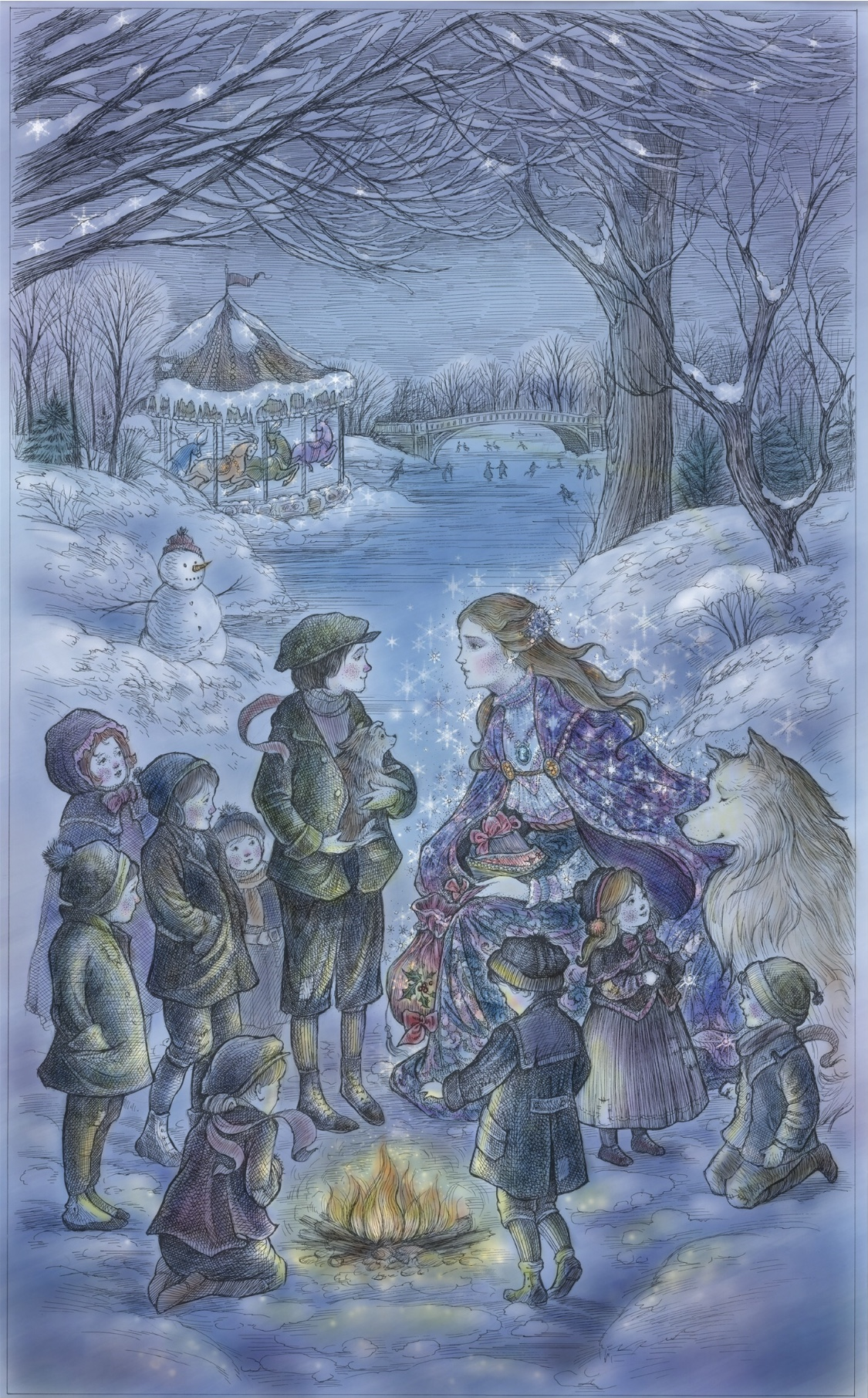
Holly and the Orphans in Central Park

Christopher Carroll: A poor boy whose act of generosity creates Holly. He is destined to be her true love.

Jeremy: An orphan in Central Park who helps Holly understand the mortal world.

== Illustrations ==
The book was illustrated by Laurel Long in a style inspired by Victorian illustrators Arthur Rackham and Maxfield Parrish. Another major influence on the art style is Northern Renaissance painting, and illustrations of the villain, Herrikhan, draw on the supernatural creatures of Ukiyo-e artwork.

== Development ==
Ryan was inspired to write the story of Holly Claus when she was performing in a Christmas musical she had written. After the performance, a young girl climbed into her lap and said, “Are you Santa’s daughter? I will keep your secret forever.” She chose to set the novel in the Gilded Age because she wanted to give it a classic feel. She described the era as “an age of invention and discovery, but also of art, literature, and music […] perfect for a magical Christmas story.”

== Reception ==
The Legend of Holly Claus was a New York Times best seller. It was a Quill Award nominee for best book of the year 2005.

== Adaptations ==
In 2007, El Paso, Texas hosted a Christmas event in which children were invited to write their dreams on paper snowflakes and hang them on the “Holly DreamTree.”

In 2005, the post office assigned The Land of Immortals its own zip code, 90209–1225. Children could send mail to Holly by addressing their letter to “Holly Claus, The Royal Palace, The City of Forever, The Land of the Immortals." Ryan replied to the letters from the perspective of Holly Claus.

Holly Claus was the cover feature on INKct Magazine's December 2020 issue. Both INKct and WestView Magazine ran Holly Claus Valentine's Day features in February 2021, and WestView Magazine has run a Holly Claus Christmas feature every holiday season since 2020. All features have been adapted from scenes in the original novel.

A Washington State ballet company workshopped Holly Claus: The Ballet of Dreams in 2015. The libretto was written by Brittney Ryan, and the production was directed and choreographed by Idalee Hutson-Fish..

According to the official website for The Legend of Holly Claus, talks are progressing for a potential animated feature.
